= Alessandrini =

Alessandrini is an Italian surname. Notable people with the surname include:

- Anthony Alessandrini (1921–1988), American jazz pianist
- Antonio Alessandrini (1786–1861), Italian zoologist
- Cristian Alessandrini (born 1985), Argentine footballer
- Elia Alessandrini (1997–2022), Swiss footballer
- Gerard Alessandrini (born 1953), American playwright
- Giancarlo Alessandrini (born 1950), Italian comic artist
- Giulio Alessandrini (1506–1590), Italian Renaissance physician
- Giulio Alessandrini (parasitologist) (1866–1954), Italian parasitologist
- Goffredo Alessandrini (1904–1978), Italian script writer and film director
- Lorenza Alessandrini (born 1990), Italian ice dancer
- Marco Alessandrini (born 1970), Italian politician
- Marjorie Alessandrini (1946–2014), French journalist,
- Patricia Alessandrini (born 1970), American composer and musician
- Renato Alessandrini (1890–1928), Italian explorer
- Rinaldo Alessandrini (born 1960), Italian musician
- Romain Alessandrini (born 1989), French footballer
- Valeria Alessandrini (born 1975), Italian politician

== See also ==
- Parco Emilio Alessandrini, memorial park in Milan, Italy
