= Ercolani =

Ercolani is an Italian-language surname. Notable people with the name include:

- Domenica Ercolani (1910–2023), Italian supercentenarian
- Giorgio Ercolani (1926–2018), Italian former sports shooter
- Giovanni Battista Ercolani (1817–1883), Italian veterinarian
- Lucian Ercolani (1888–1976), Italian furniture designer
- Milena Ercolani (born 1963), Sammarinese poet and novelist
- James William Ercolani, birth name of James Darren (1936–2024), Italian-American actor
