= Palazzo Compagni =

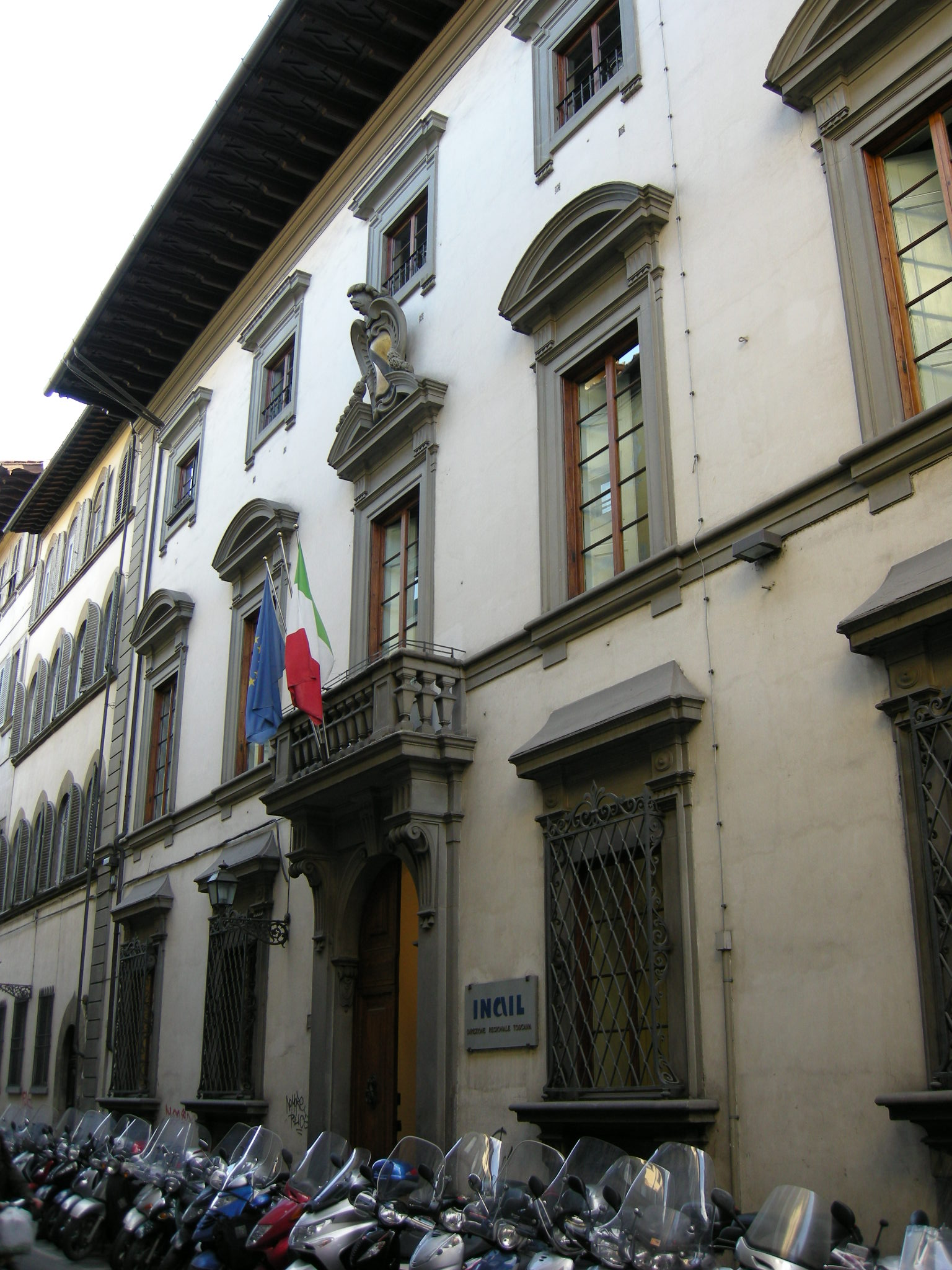
Palazzo Compagni

The Palazzo Compagni or Palazzo Cresci is a palazzo on via Bufalini in Florence.

== History ==
It was originally built as a tower-house by the Cresci family from Montereggi, after they arrived in Florence at the end of the 13th century - via Bufalini was then known as via di Santo Gilio. Thanks to the wool trade the Cresci family became very rich and gained many political positions. In the mid 14th century they replaced their tower with a grand palazzo.

In 1529 one of the family members was accused of fraud and treason against the Republic of Florence, leading to a period of decline for the family. The palazzo passed to the Libri family then to the Alessandrini and Marzi-Medici families and finally (in the mid 18th century) to senator Braccio Compagni, a descendant of the chronicler Dino Compagni. Zanobi del Rossi redesigned the palazzo's interior in the 18th century, giving it its present appearance.

It was next bought by the rich British tutor and librarian Sir Francis Joseph Sloane, son of an expatriate Scottish banker. Sloane was the owner of the Villa Medicea di Careggi and provided most of the funding for the new façade for Santa Croce Basilica. The palazzo's next owners were the Bouterline family, the Banca Immobiliaire, the Italian Commercial Bank and the Pinucci family. The Italian National Bank bought it in 1929 and took on Vittorio Tognetti to repair and redesign it - it thus became INAIL's regional office in Florence. Damaged during the Second World War, it underwent several postwar restorations, the last of which ended in 1970.

== Design ==
=== Exterior ===
The ground floor has several examples of Cinquecento-style kneeling windows (literally kneeling windows) with doorways topped with balconies. The windows of the upper floors are surmounted by circular pediments, apart from the top floor which has Baroque chambranles. Its decoration is typically Florentine and is carved in pietra serena on a white background. The Compagni coat of arms is at the centre of the façade, though a small Cresci coat of arms still survives in a corner to the right.

=== Interior ===
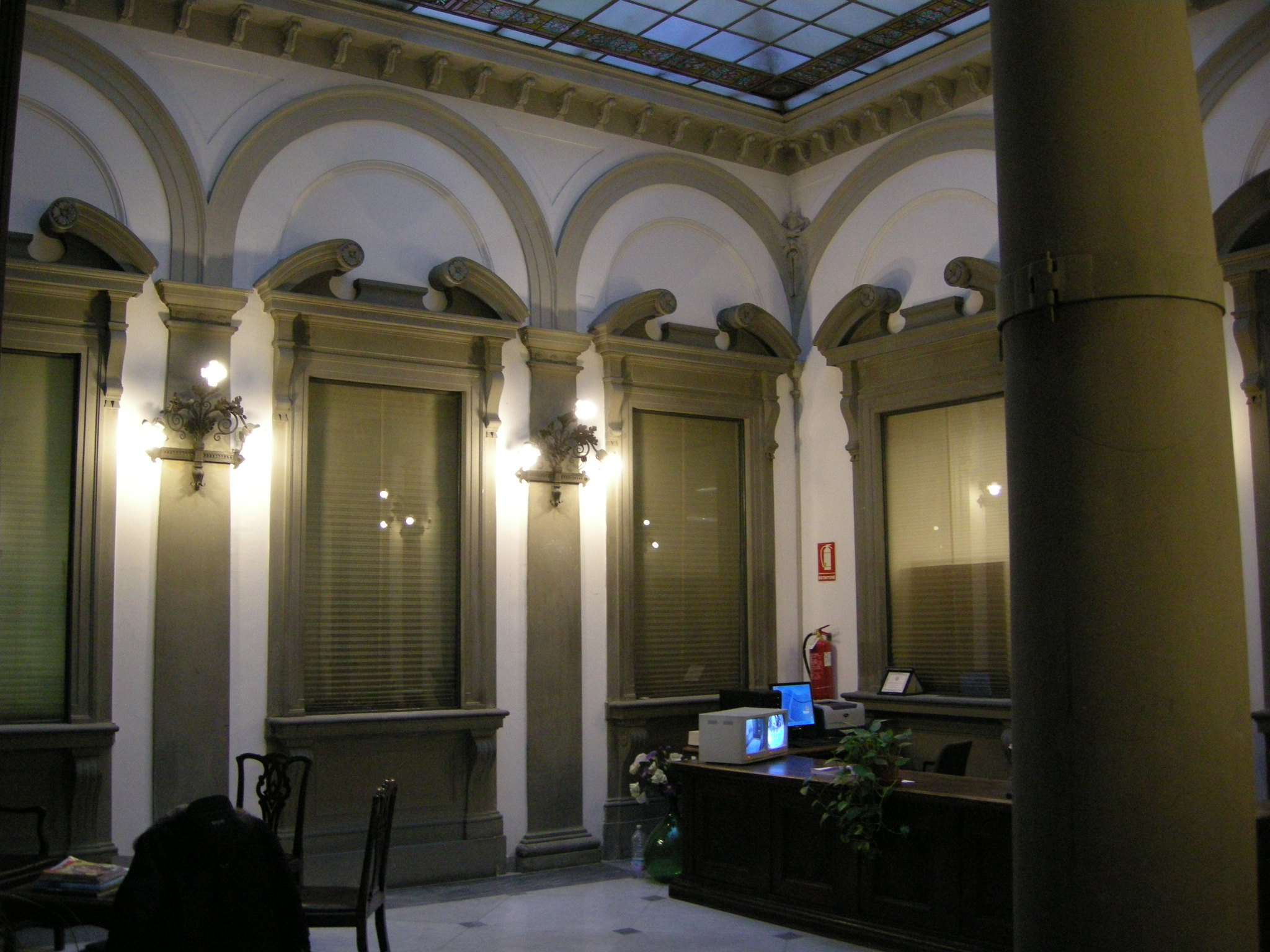
Main hall.

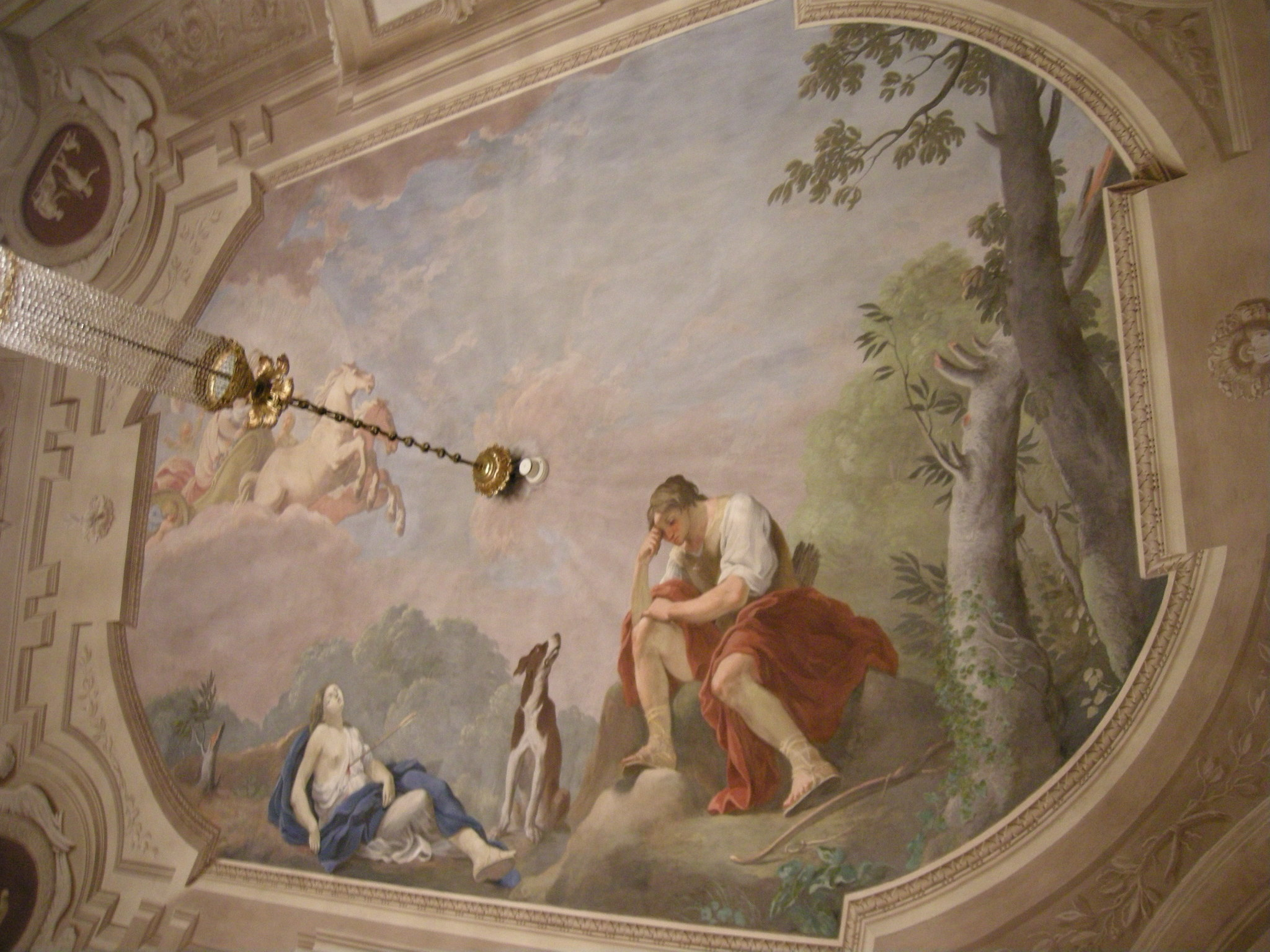
Frescoes in the Mullet Hall

Despite several alterations to its interior, it is one of the few palazzi in Florence to have retained much of its interior furniture (essentially in the Empire style) and decoration, notably frescoes, stuccowork and sculpted fireplaces.

The main doorway opens into an interior courtyard by Zanobi del Rosso with several loggias, again with finestre inginocchiate - initially open to the sky, the courtyard is now covered by a coloured glass ceiling installed in the 20th century after a project by Ulisse De Matteis allowed this space to be turned into a reception area. At the corners of the cornice are several sculpted masks.

The two ground floor rooms include white stuccowork, typical of the early and mid 16th century white-on-white-and-gold style which began to dominate Florence after the arrival of the Albertoli brothers. On the first floor is the main salon with rich white stuccowork commissioned by the Compagni family in the 18th century, gilded furniture, a large Murano ware glass vessel and two history paintings commissioned by Sloane from Giuseppe Bezzuoli - they are entitled Dino Compagni trying to make peace between the Guelphs and the Ghibellines inside the baptistery and The laying of the foundation stone for the basilica of Santa Croce in the presence of Pope Pius IX and Vittorio Emanuele II. At the four corners of the room are four coats of arms celebrating other important Florentine families linked to the Compagni family by marriage.

The green room is now the office of INAIL's regional director and includes ceiling frescoes by Giuseppe Antonio Fabbrini of scenes from Orlando Furioso, signed and dated above the window to 1787. The red room includes more frescoes by Fabbrini, here assisted by Tommaso Gherardini - the main one shows Cephalus mourning the deaths of Penelope's suitors and Eos and the shepherd Cephalus. A chimneypiece with details in the Empire style is decorated with tiles made in the Ginori factory, showing several different butterflies.

== Gallery ==
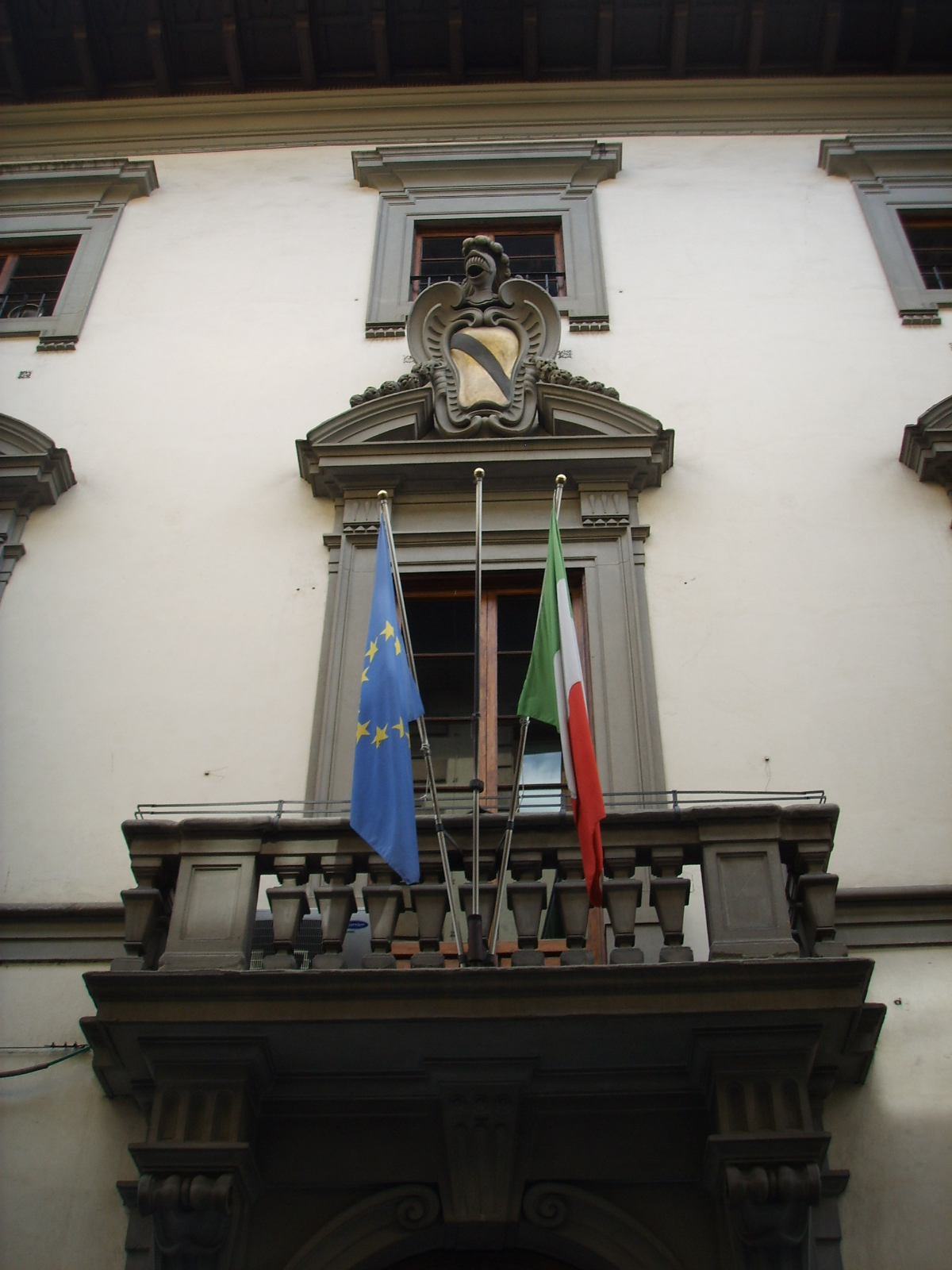
Balcony and coats of arms

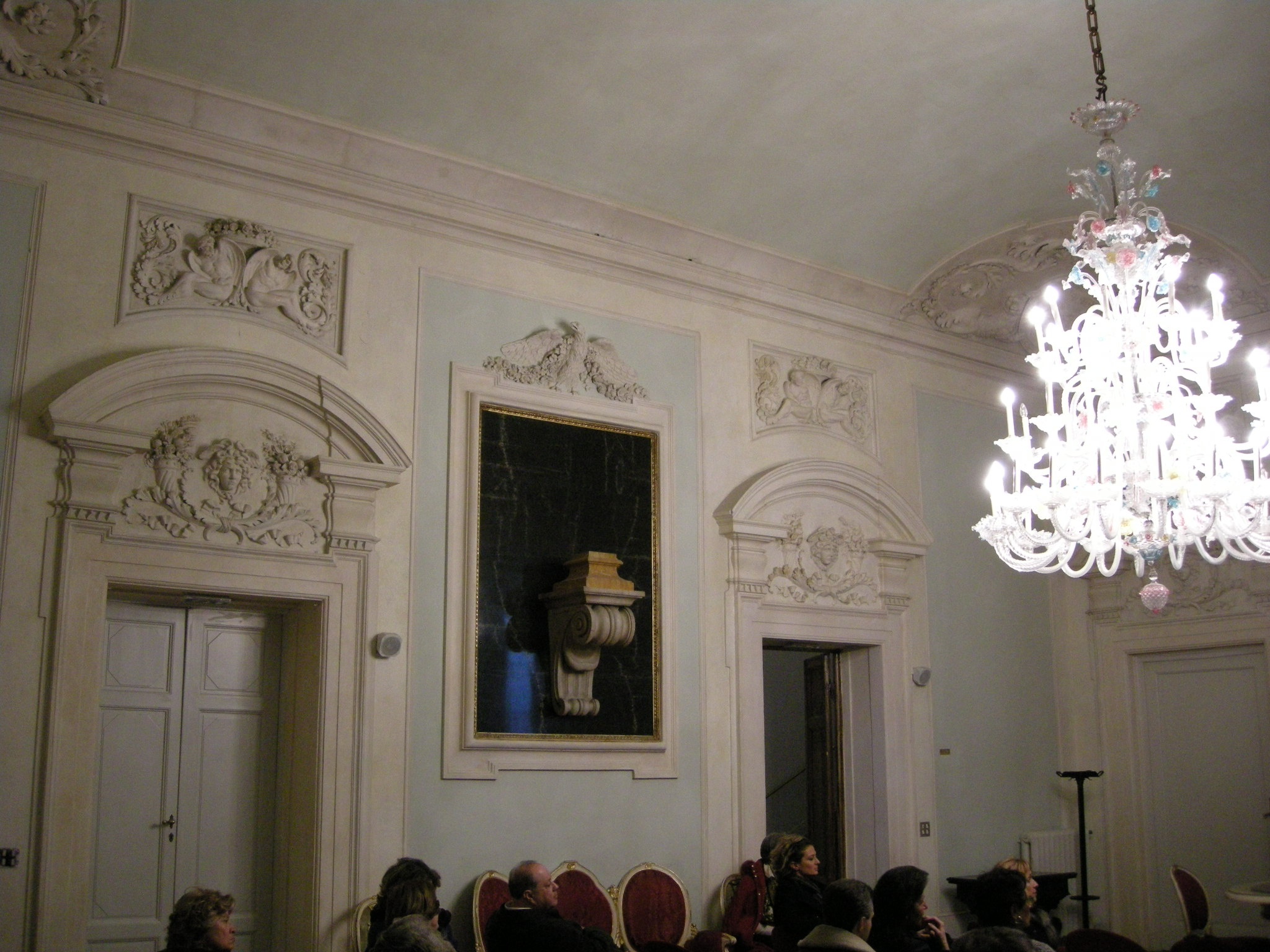
Salon

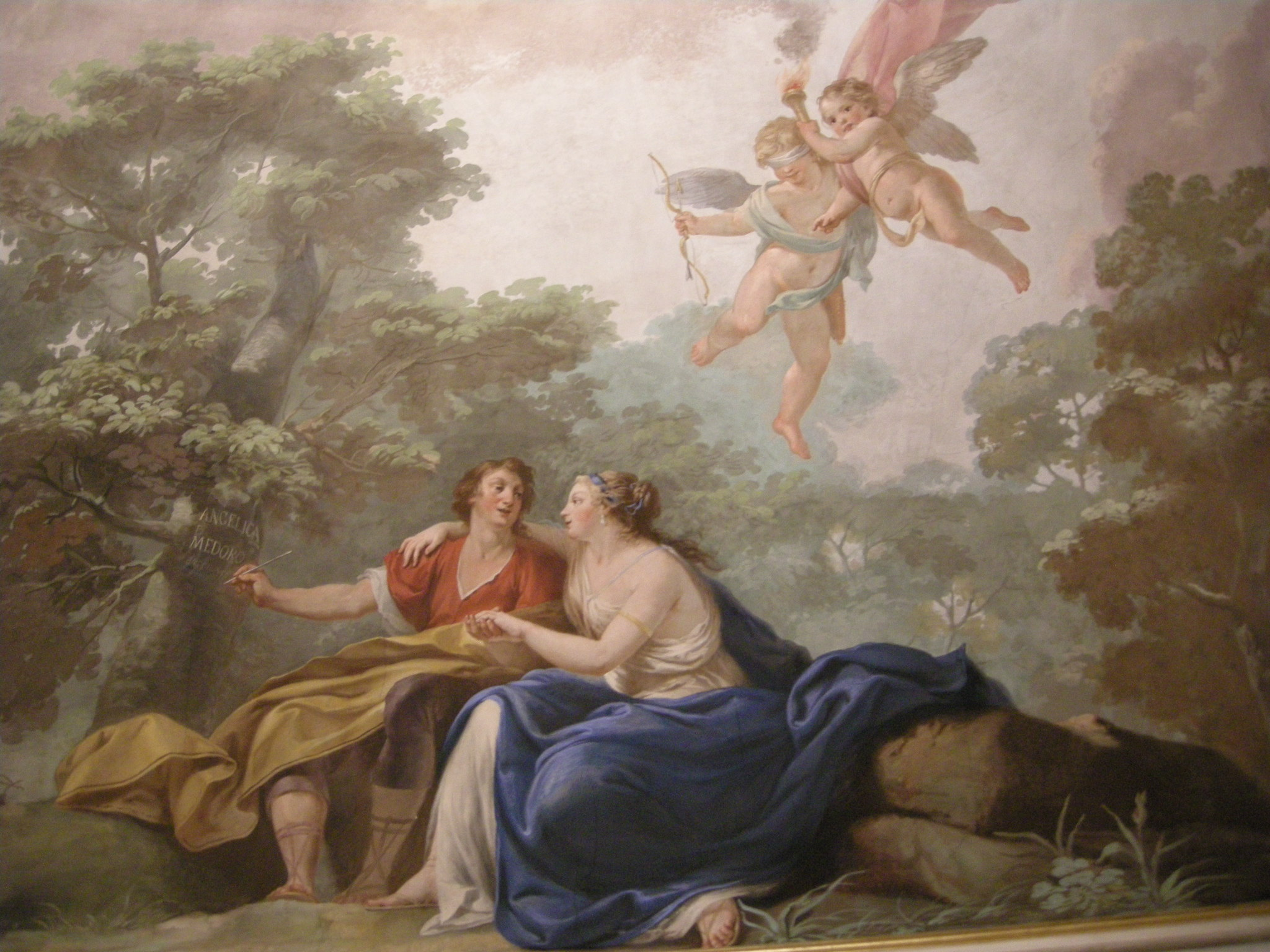
Scene from Orlando Furioso, fresco by Fabbrini

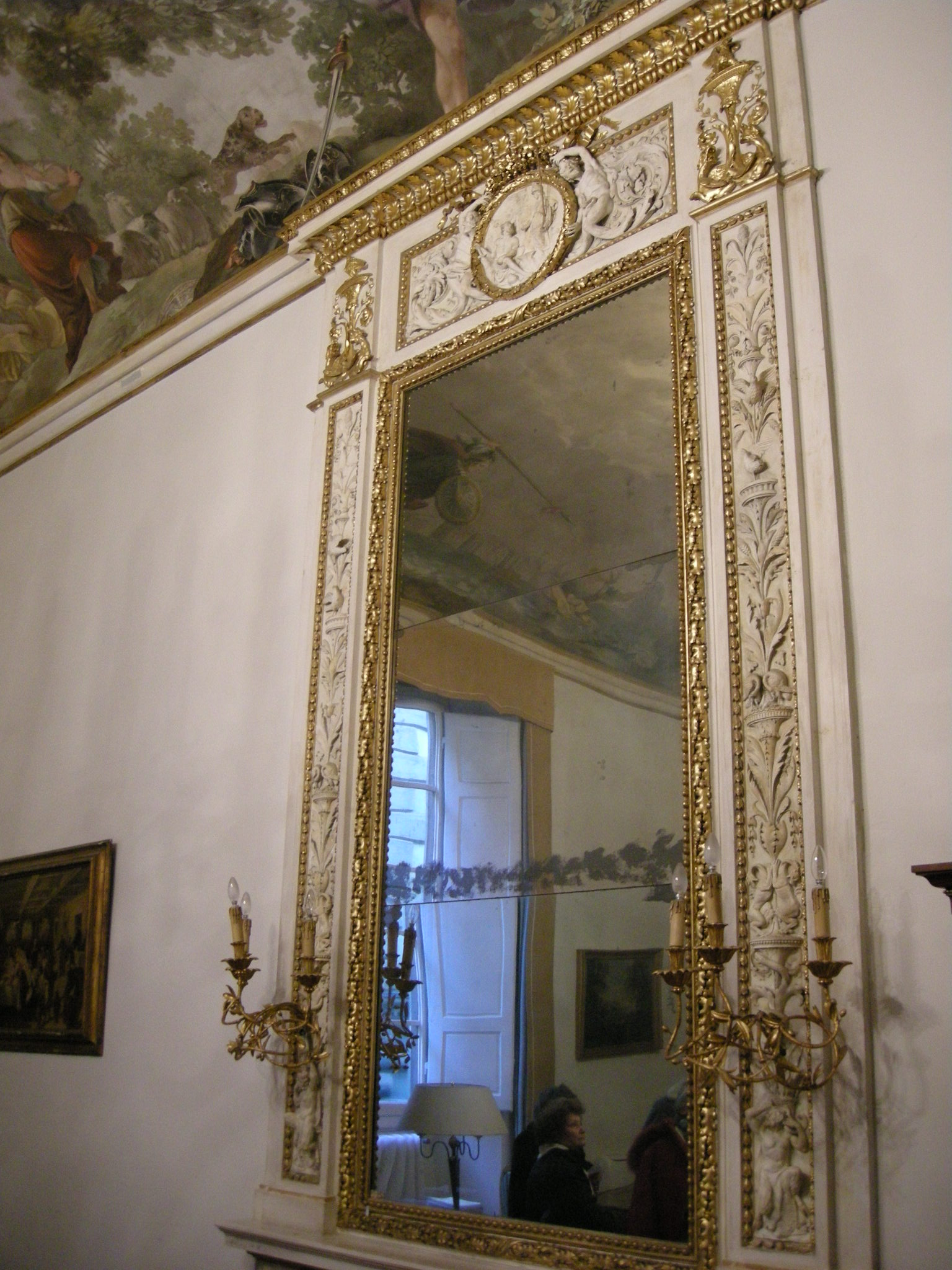
Stuccoed mirror

== Bibliography ==
- (in Italian) Sandra Carlini, Lara Mercanti, Giovanni Straffi, I Palazzi parte seconda. Arte e storia degli edifici civili di Firenze, Alinea, Florence 2004.
- (in Italian) Francesco Lumachi Firenze - Nuova guida illustrata storica-artistica-aneddotica della città e dintorni, Florence, Società Editrice Fiorentina, 1929
