= Palazzo Martelli =

Building in Florence, Italy

Coordinates: 43°46′26.62″N 11°15′12.73″E

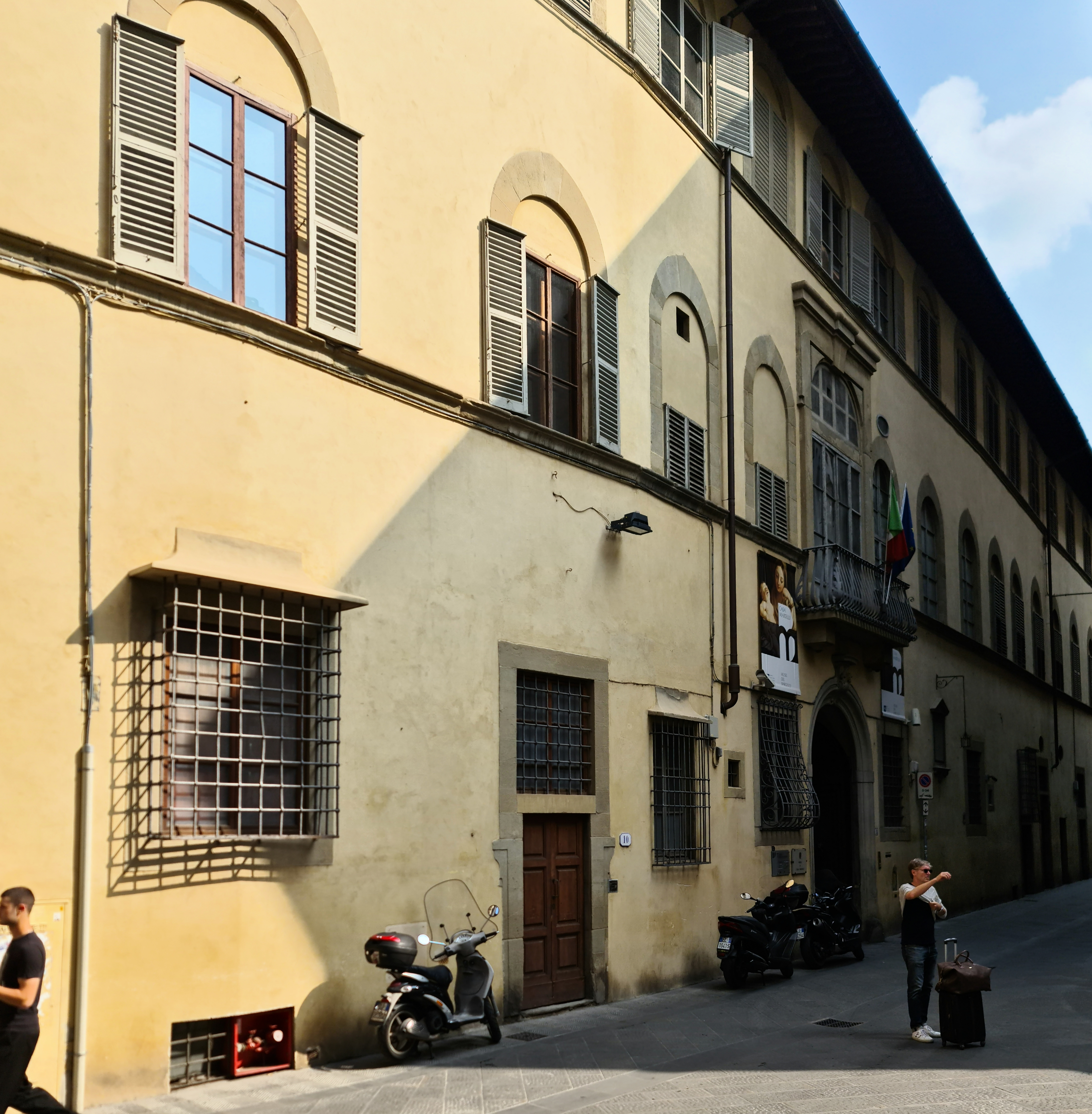
Exterior of the Martellli Palace, Florence

Coat of arms of the Florentine Martelli family

The Palazzo Martelli was a residential palace, and since 2009, a civic museum displaying in situ the remains of the original family's valuable art collection, as well as its frescoed rooms. The palace is located on Via Ferdinando Zannetti 8 near the corner with Via Cerretani in central Florence, region of Tuscany, Italy.

== History ==
In the place where the palace there were the old houses of the Martelli family, since the 1520s. In 1627, the area of this palace was aggregated after the marriage of Senator Marco Martelli and his cousin. Marco also acquired further buildings. Some frescoes on the main floor date to this era. The Cardinal Francesco Martelli (1633–1717) was a member of this family.

In 1738, Giuseppe Maria Martelli, Archbishop of Florence and Niccolo Martelli, bailiff of Florence, unified the palaces under the designs of the architect Bernardino Ciurini. The piano nobile of the palace was decorated by frescoes by Vincenzo Meucci, Ferdinando Melani, Niccolò Connestabile, and Bernardo Minozzi, as well as stuccowork by Giovanni Martino Portogalli.

At the end of the eighteenth century Marco, son of Niccolo, commissioned further frescoes depicting mythological and historic episodes of the family from teams led by Tommaso Gherardini, while Luigi Sabatelli decorated the vault of the staircase, where they displayed once two works attributed to Donatello, a statue of David and the coat of arms of the family. The marble David statue is now displayed in the National Gallery of Art in Washington, and it is now felt to be a copy of the marble David by Donatello in the Bargello in Florence.

Large parts of the house's artworks were sold over the past two centuries. In 1986, the last Martelli resident, Francesca Martelli, willed the house to the Curia of Florence. In 1998, the Curia sold the complex to the Italian state as part of a larger deal. This allowed the collections to be opened as a museum in 2006.

Even accounting for the loss and dispersal of items, the collection remains impressive, including works by Piero di Cosimo, Francesco Francia, Francesco Morandini, Salvator Rosa, Giordano, Beccafumi, Sustermans, Michael Sweerts, Pieter Brueghel the Younger, Orazio Borgianni, Francesco Curradi, and collections of small bronzes, including some by Soldani Benzi. The works are displayed in the crowded arrangement typical of the period. The ground floor has a room frescoed with an illusionistic pergola by Connestabile.

== Gallery Rooms ==
First Room of Gallery

- Ceiling fresco (1822): Domenico Martelli (1414–1476), Gonfaloniere of Justice and diplomat, in 1454 granted by the Duke of Calabria (of the Anjou family), the privilege of including the fleurs-de-lis of France in the family coat of arms, painted by Antonio Marini
- Portrait of Niccolò Martelli's Family in Parlor (1777) by Giovanni Battista Benigni
- Terracotta Bust of Ugolino di Luigi Martelli, Bishop of Narni (circa 1518) attributed to "Ghoro" sculptor.
- Portrait of Antonio de'Ricci by Francesco Morandini
- Conspiracy of Catiline sealed with libations of wine and blood (1662) by Salvator Rosa

Second Room of Gallery

- Festival of Lupercalia and Cult of either Vesta (or Cerealia) (circa 1512) by Domenico Beccafumi
- Oath of Brutus against Tarquins after Death of Lucretia (circa 1685) by Luca Giordano
- Portrait of Vittoria delle Rovere as St Margaret of Antioch (before 1634) by Justus Sustermans

Third Room of Gallery

- Ceiling fresco (1822): Roberto Martelli (1408–1464), Donatello's patron, visits the sculptor's atelier painted by Antonio Marini
- Dance party in a Tavern and Kermesse of St George by Pieter Brueghel the Younger
- Veduta of Venice by Hendrik Frans van Lint
- Self-portrait of Luigi Sabatelli (1802)
- Self-portrait of Pietro Benvenuti (1802)
- Bronze Statuettes by Massimiliano Soldani Benzi, collected by abbot Domenico Martelli (1672–1753), depicting copies of classic statues:
  - Apollo playing the lyre
  - Sansovino's Bacchus (but without the satyr at the base)
  - Dancing Faun with cymbals
  - Meleager offering sacrifices to Diana
  - Laocoön and His Sons
- Seven small boxwood sculptures (1743 -1751) by Johannes Sporer, also collected for Domenico Martelli, depicting ancient sculptures
  - Farnese Hercules of the National Archaeological Museum of Naples
  - Red Faun of the Capitoline Museum
  - Faun or Bacchus
  - Laocoön and His Sons
  - Hermes of the Pio-Clementino Museum, Rome.
  - Dying Gaul or Galatian and Dying Warrior, both of the Capitoline Museum in Rome

Room of the Poets or of Parnassus

- Ceiling painted (1758) by Tommaso Gherardini
- Half-Bust Portraits of Philosophers Democritus and Heraclitus (1612–1613) by Orazio Borgianni
- Krater Vase depicting Martelli Villas at Soffiano and Gricigliano (early 19th-century) by Ginori Factory in the shape of Medici Vase

Room of Love Ruling the World

- Ceiling fresco (1847): Nuptial allegory, Love ruling the World with Temperance (bridle) and Legal Union (bundle) by Nicola Cianfanelli painted for the wedding of Alessandro Martelli (1812–1904) with Marianna Velluti Zati of the Dukes of San Clemente.
- Chiaroscuro decoration by Antonio Brunetti and Leopoldo Balestieri

Anteroom

- Wax Bust-Portrait of Bishop of Pistoia, Scipione de' Ricci by Clemente Susini
- Adoration of Jesus Child attributed to Piero di Cosimo
- Portrait of Baccio Martelli (1511–1564) attributed to Santi di Tito

Ballroom (197–1800)

- Vedute with coat of arms of Martelli-Pucci and Martelli-Ricci in room designed by architect Luca Ristorini, and painted by Piero and Antonio Miseri

== Bibliography ==
- Francesco Lumachi, Firenze – Nuova guida illustrata storica-artistica-aneddotica della città e dintorni, Firenze, Società Editrice Fiorentina, 1929
- Alessandra Civai, Donatello e Roberto Martelli: nuove acquisizioni documentarie, in Donatello Studien, atti del convegno, Firenze, 1986
- Alessandra Civai, Dipinti e sculture in casa Martelli, Opus Libri, Firenze 1990
- Alessandra Civai, La quadreria Martelli di Firenze. L'allestimento tardosettecentesco alla luce di un inventario figurato, in "Studi di Storia dell'Arte", marzo, 1991, pp. 285–299
- Marcello Vannucci, Splendidi palazzi di Firenze, Le Lettere, Firenze 1995 ISBN 88-7166-230-X
- Alessandra Civai, Il Gabinetto di Belle Arti di Palazzo Martelli a Firenze, in Proporzioni, I, 2000, pp. 217–240
