= Alessandroni =

Alessandroni is an Italian surname. Notable people with the surname include:

- Alessandro Alessandroni (1925–2017), Italian musician and composer
- Hugh Alessandroni (1908–1977), American fencer
- Juan Ignacio Alessandroni (born 1988), Argentine professional footballer

== See also ==
- Alessandri (disambiguation)
- Alessandrini
