= David (Donatello, marble) =

Marble sculpture by Donatello

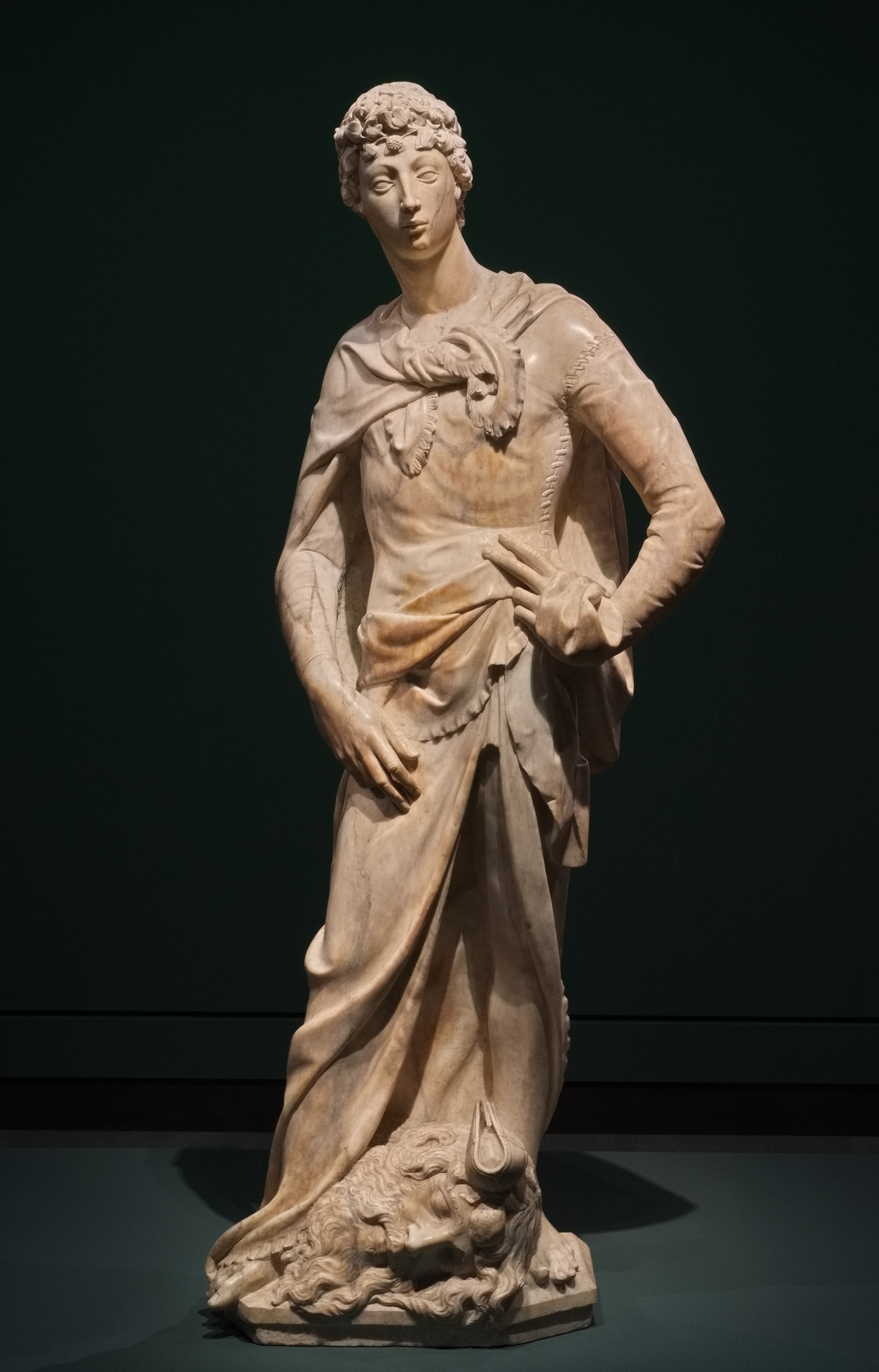
- The marble David, pictured at the Museo Nazionale del Bargello, Florence, in 2022.
- Artist: Donatello
- Year: 1408–09, 1416
- Subject: David
- Dimensions: 191 cm (75 in)
- Location: Bargello

David is a marble statue of the biblical hero by the Italian Renaissance sculptor Donatello. One of his early works (1408–1409), it was originally commissioned by the Operai del Duomo, the Overseers of the Office of Works, for the Florence Cathedral and was his most important commission up to that point. In 1416, the Signoria of Florence ordered the statue to be sent to the Palazzo della Signoria (now known as the Palazzo Vecchio), where it held both a religious and political significance. As part of its relocation, Donatello was asked to make adjustments to the David.

Typical of the International Gothic style, the marble piece is noted as not being representative of the approach Donatello had toward his work as he matured. The statue is also clothed, unlike the nearly nude bronze figure of David which Donatello sculpted circa the 1440s. The latter became more widely known than his marble piece; both are now in the Museo Nazionale del Bargello in Florence.

== History ==
=== Biblical background ===
Donatello's statue depicts David in the story of David and Goliath told in 1 Samuel 17 of the biblical Books of Samuel. In the narrative, the Israelites are fighting the Philistines, whose champion – Goliath – repeatedly offers to meet the Israelites' best warrior in single combat to decide the whole battle. None of the trained Israelite soldiers are brave enough to fight the giant Goliath, yet David, a shepherd boy who is too young to be a soldier, accepts the challenge. Saul, the king of Israel, offers David armour and weapons, but the boy is untrained and refuses them. Instead, he goes out with his sling and confronts Goliath before hitting the giant in the head with a stone and knocking him down. He then grabs Goliath's sword and cuts off his head, causing the Philistines to withdraw as agreed, and saving the Israelites. David's special strength comes from God, and the story illustrates the triumph of good over evil. According to Olszewski, David's triumph over Goliath has been interpreted as a "parallel of Christ's triumph" over the devil.

=== Commission ===
In 1408, the Operai del Duomo commissioned the statue. At the time, Donatello was twenty-two and had been active in the workshop of Lorenzo Ghiberti. Donatello's earliest known important commission, the marble David statue was to be placed on the tribune of the dome at one of the buttresses on the north side of Florence Cathedral. Nanni di Banco was commissioned to carve a companion piece, a statue of equal size depicting the prophet Isaiah. One or the other of the statues was lifted into place in 1409, but at 6½ feet (just under two metres) high (Note: The size, 3 1/4 braccia or 191 cm (75 in), was stipulated in the 1408 commission by the Operai.) was found to be too small to be easily visible from the ground and was taken down; both statues then languished in the Opera del Duomo, the workshop of the Duomo for several years.

According to Caglioti et al., it is possible that it was Donatello's David raised on the north tribune of the cathedral and removed soon afterward. As the removal occurred on 3 July 1409, it might have been erected on the feast day of John the Baptist (24 June), the patron saint of the city. It is also possible that instead it was di Banco's sculpture of Isaiah that was placed on the tribune.

H. W. Janson, in his monograph on Donatello (1957), made his case that the marble David was indeed the statue commissioned by the Operai del Duomo in 1408 to accompany the Isaiah carved by Nanni di Banco, a point disputed by some historians. On 3 July 1409, the Operai decided to remove the statue of a prophet that had been installed "near the dome", an action later recorded by Italian historian Giovanni Poggi. Therefore, it appears that one of the two statues had actually been placed on the buttress. Because Donatello's David had been completed only three weeks prior, this must have been the Isaiah, and the marble David never left the Cathedral workshop until it was suddenly transferred to the Palazzo della Signoria. Janson never doubted that the Bargello David was the result of the 1408 commission, concluding that the youthful Donatello had miscalculated the visibility of his sculpture when viewed from street level ninety feet (about 27 metres) below.

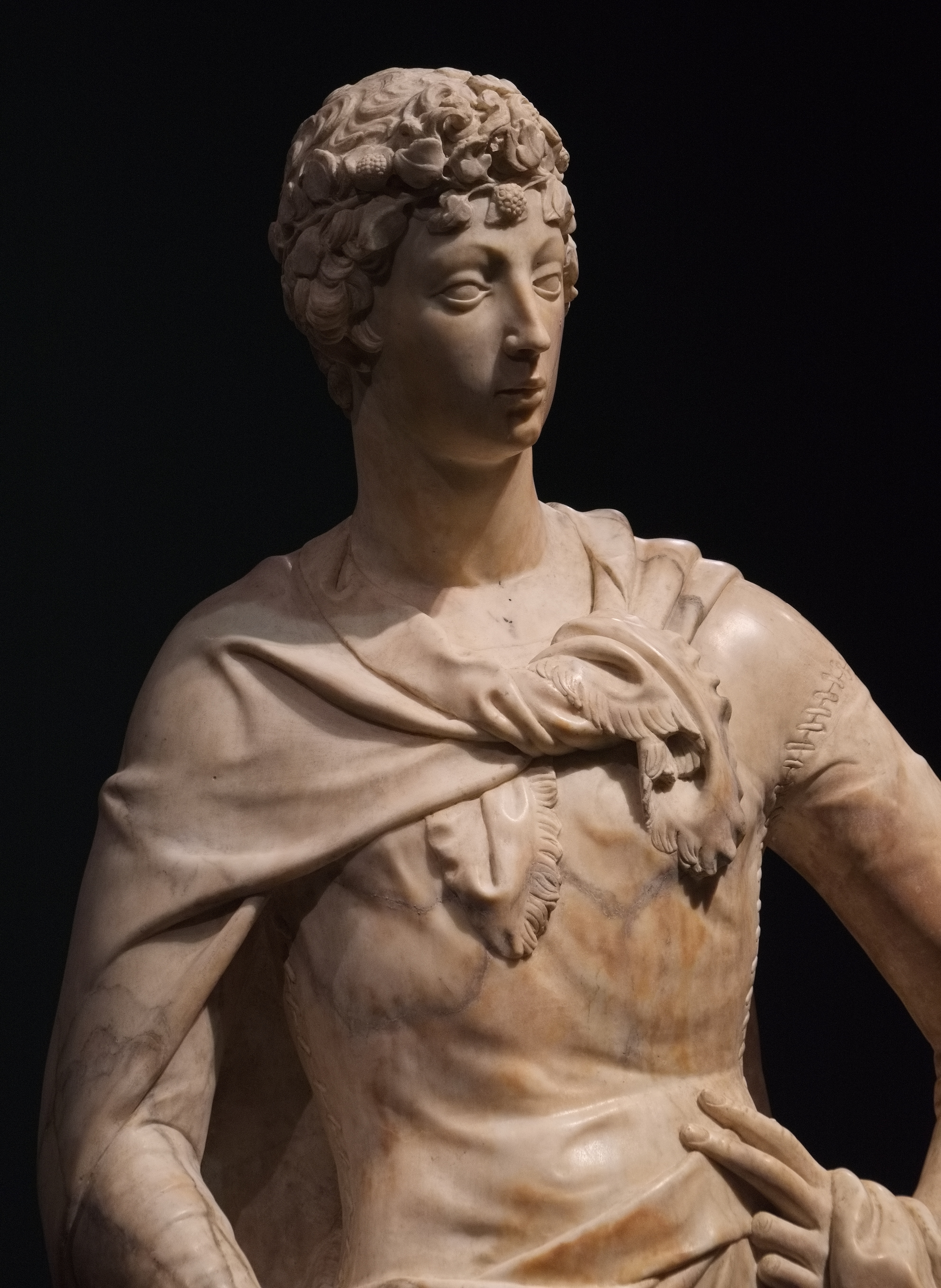
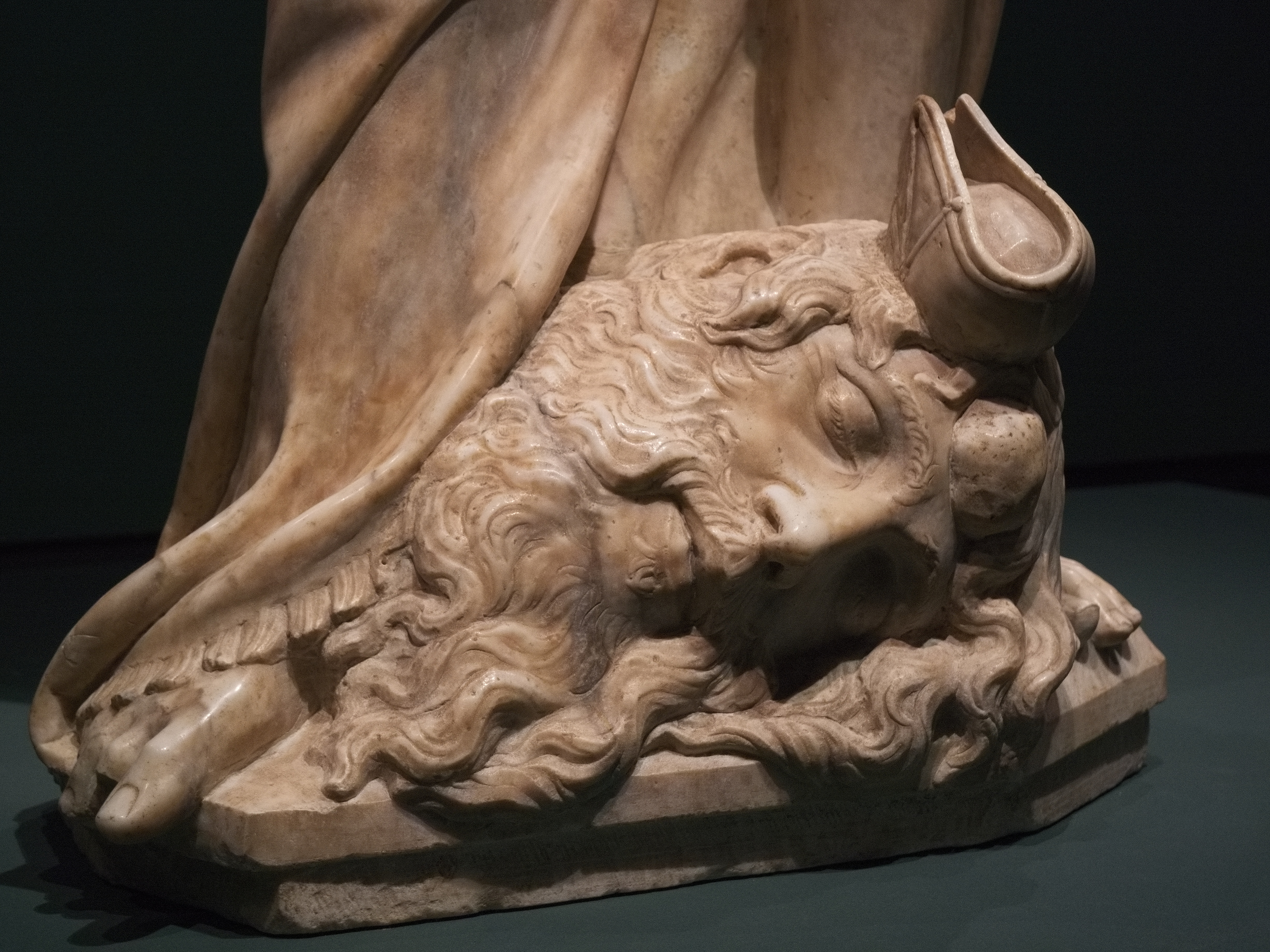
Details of the marble David (top) and the head of Goliath (bottom)

Manfred Wundram disputes Janson's association of the marble David with the cathedral buttress, pointing out that its surface is extraordinarily refined, to a degree not necessary for a figure placed so high above the street below. He notes also that it lacks the scale, not to mention the exaggerated details and posture needed to be discernible at such a distance, an unlikely omission for an artist so sensitive to the placement of his sculptures and to their relationship with the beholder. For him it is obvious that the sculpture with its fine work was intended to be viewed by a closer audience. Olszewski opines that whether or not it was ever installed in that location is unclear, but in any case it was promptly returned to the Opera del Duomo and replaced by Donatello's Joshua, a colossus in terracotta.

=== Execution and design ===
Amy Bloch observes that a number of arguments have been made concerning the manner of the execution of Donatello's marble David. Some authors declare that it was carved circa 1409 and altered by Donatello in 1416, before it was moved to the Palazzo della Signoria. Others, such as Manfred Wundram, argue that it was always intended for placement in the palace. He speculates that Donatello carved the Bargello David particularly for the governmental palace and sculpted the Isaiah around 1409.

The marble piece is a work closely tied to tradition, revealing few signs of the innovative approach to representation that the artist would develop as he matured. Although the positioning of the legs hints at a classical contrapposto, the figure holds a swaying Gothic posture that derives from Ghiberti's influence and is particularly representative of the International Style. Alluding to ancient Greek heroism, the figure wears a crown of amaranth. In antiquity, amaranth was associated with Achilles and represented the "undying memory of heroes".

At its time the statue was considered "as an achievement of great significance", its style reflecting a transition from International Gothic to the early Renaissance, with features that Poeschke referred to as "the slight twist of the body, the challenging level gaze, and the left arm brazenly propped against the hip." According to art historians Charles Avery and Sarah McHam, the head of Goliath, lying at David's feet, "is carved with great assurance and reveals the young sculptor's genuinely Renaissance interest in an ancient Roman type of mature, bearded head".

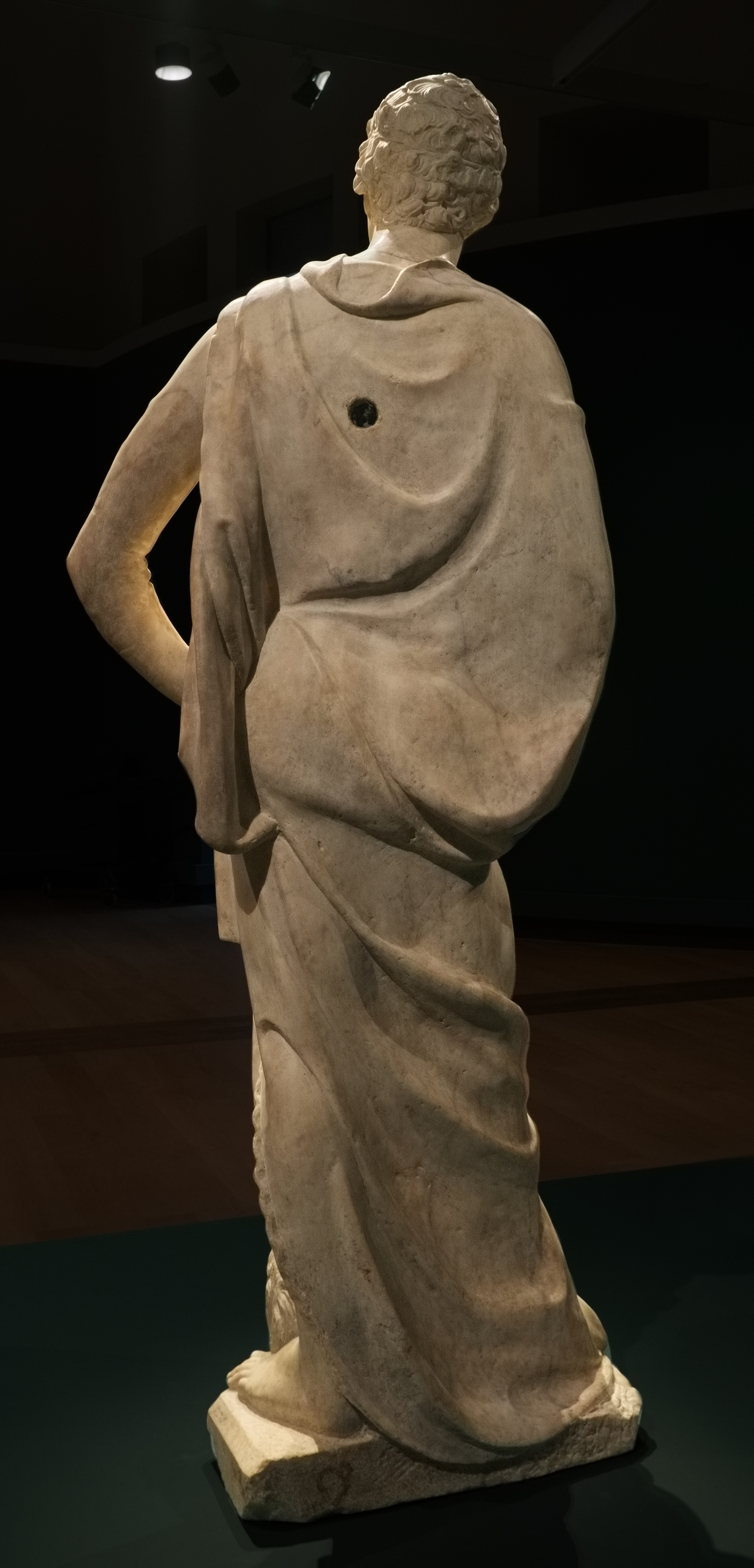
The back of the figure not elaborated, with a hole to anchor it

=== Adjustments and relocation ===
In 1416, the Signoria of Florence commanded that the David be transferred from the workshop at the cathedral to the Palazzo della Signoria (also known as Palazzo dei Priori and now known as the Palazzo Vecchio). The statue was installed there in September, in the Sala dell'Orologio, ("Hall of the Clock"). displayed against a wall painted with a pattern of Florence's emblem of the lily. As these heraldic lilies were symbols of Florence's alliance with the Angevin dynasty, this placement of the marble statue indicates that it had political significance.

Maria Monica Donato writes that the placement of Donatello's marble David in the Palazzo della Signoria was in the Florentine tradition of using images as civic symbols, as part of a programme of political propaganda by the first generation of humanists. In addition to being a religious hero, a victorious David was seen to have a "special civic value in early fifteenth-century Florence". As a figure, David was an effective political symbol with an anti-tyrannical connotation. This Florentine view of David accounted for the adjustments Donatello was asked to make to the statue. Avery and McHam write that upon its acquisition by the Palazzo della Signoria, the statue was "painted, gilded, and set on a pedestal inlaid with mosaic and must have looked highly ornamental".

David "became a symbol of good government", inspiring its pedestal inscription: PRO PATRIA FORTITER DIMICANTIBUS ETIAM ADVERSUS TERRIBILISSIMOS HOSTES DII PRAESTANT AUXILIUM ("To those who fight bravely for the fatherland the gods lend aid even against the most terrible foes"). (Note: Documents on the statue may be found in Janson & Lányi 1963, pp. 3–4, and in Omaggio a Donatello, pp. 126–127. On the political implications of David for early-modern Florence, see Maria Monica Donato, "Hercules and David in the Early Decoration of the Palazzo Vecchio: Manuscript Evidence," Journal of the Warburg and Courtauld Institutes 54 (1991), pp. 83–98 and Andrew Butterfield, "New Evidence for the Iconography of David in Quattrocento Florence," I Tatti Studies 6 (1995), pp. 114–133.)

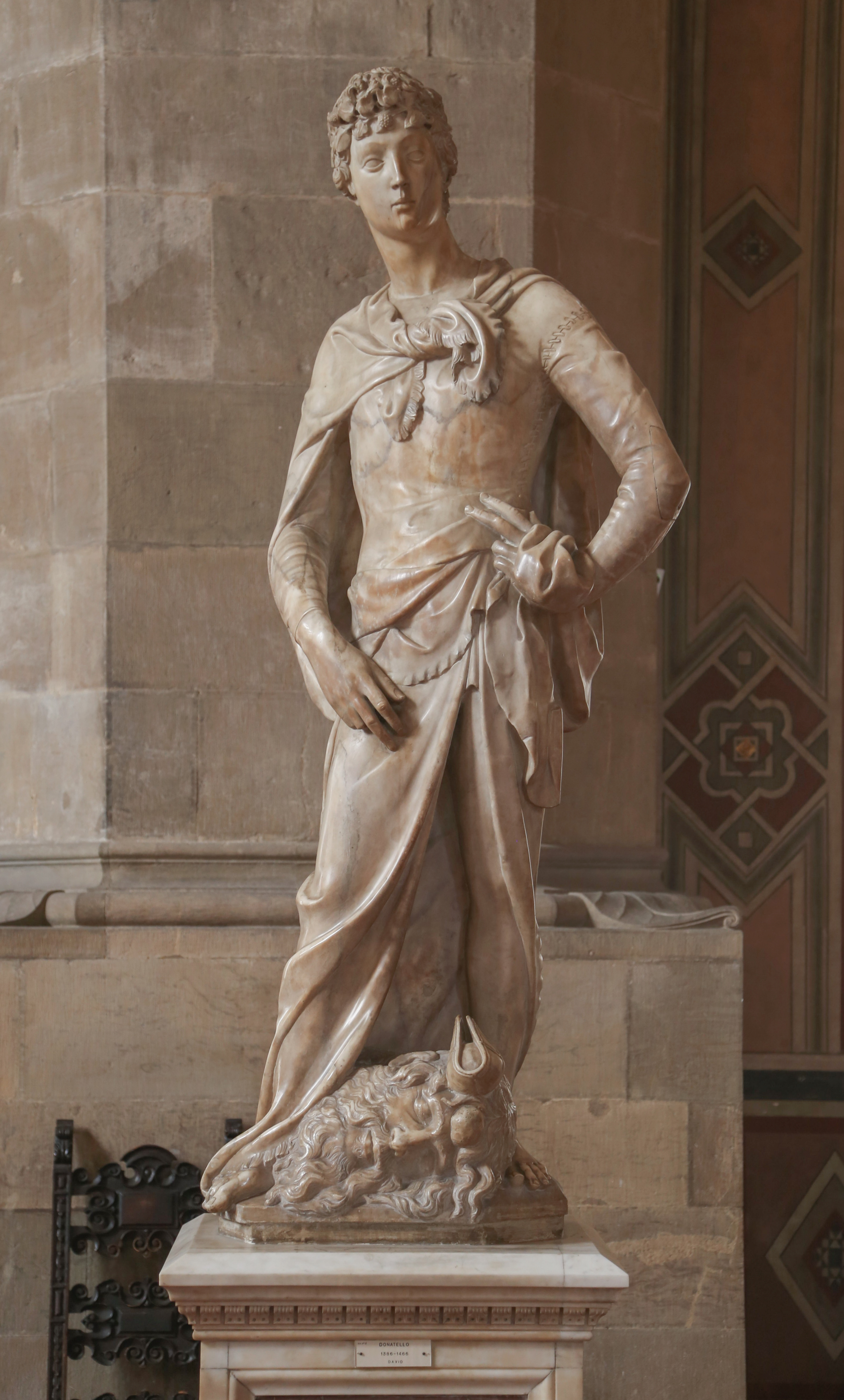
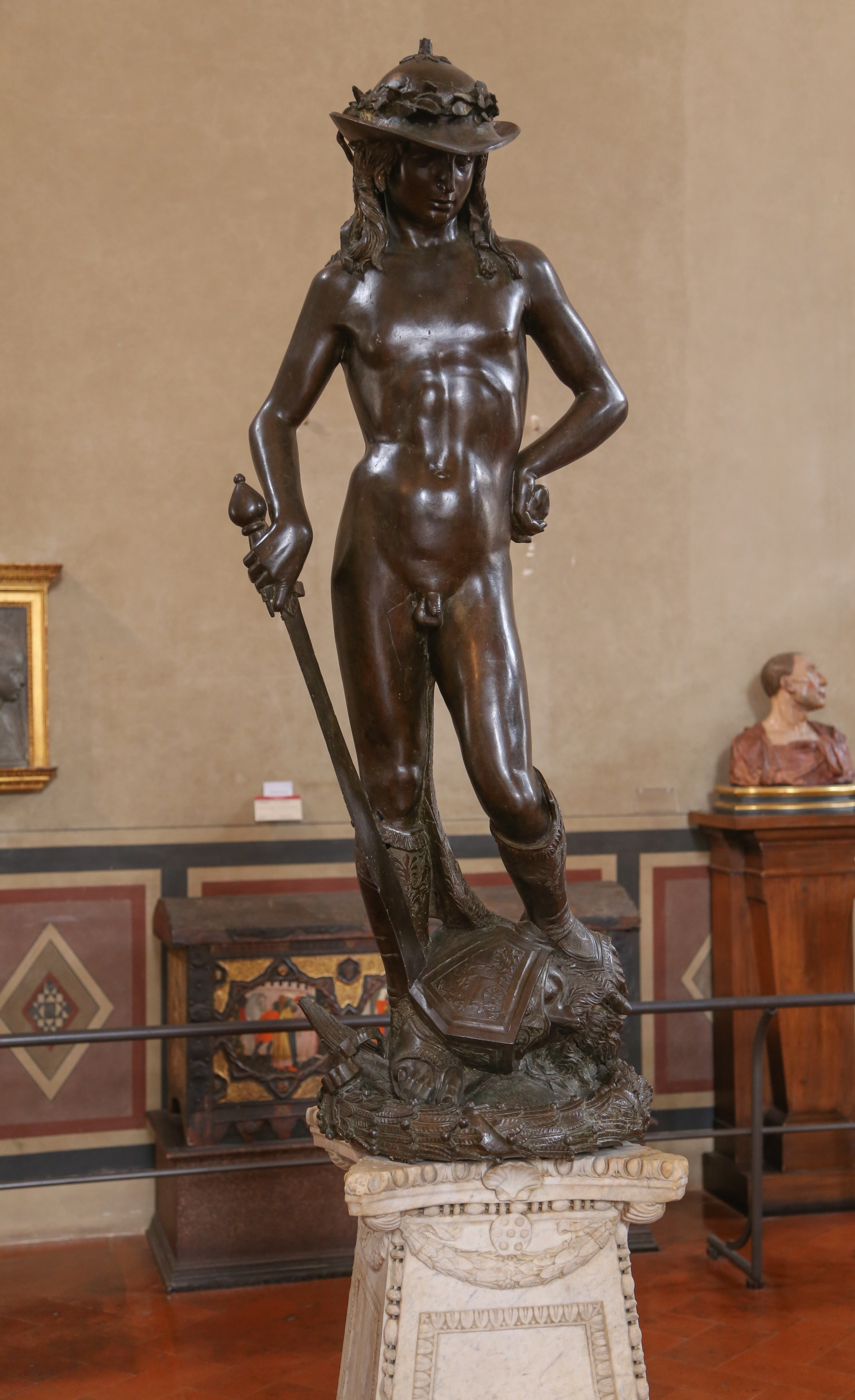
Both Davids displayed in the Sala di Donatello at the Bargello

=== Later provenance and exhibitions ===
Both of Donatello's statues of David, in marble and in bronze, entered the collection of Florence's Museo Nazionale del Bargello in the 1870s. In 2023, the marble David was exhibited in the Victoria and Albert Museum in London as part of its "Donatello: Sculpting the Renaissance" exhibition. This was the first time it was seen in the United Kingdom.

== Influence and subsequent projects ==
The experience with the statue first placed at the buttress on the roofline of the cathedral being found to be too small to be easily visible from the ground was probably decisive for Donatello. The result was the Joshua, a 16½ foot-high (five-metres high) colossal statue of the Biblical figure, made in 1410 of terracotta painted and gessoed white to imitate weathered Antique marble. It was erected in 1412 on one of the buttresses of the dome.

Around the 1440s, Donatello produced his nearly nude bronze statue of David, which art historians now consider an iconic sculpture of the Renaissance. It has been hypothesised by some commentators that Donatello created another marble statue of David, once belonging to the Martelli family, allies of the Medici, and usually called the "Martelli David". Several artists had significantly reworked the surface of the unfinished statue. In 1489, the statue was described as being set into a wall in the Martelli palace, with Donatello receiving no attribution. It is shown in the background of the painting, Portrait of Ugolino Martelli (1536 or 1537), by Bronzino. The unfinished statue was acquired in 1916 by the Widener Collection of the National Gallery of Art in Washington, DC from the Palazzo Martelli. John Pope-Hennessy vigorously disputes that the Martelli David should be ascribed to Donatello as asserted by Giorgio Vasari in the sixteenth century, and adduces evidence to support his contention that it was a work by the Florentine sculptor Antonio Rossellino. The National Gallery of Art attributes it to either Bernardo Rossellino (1409–1464) or his brother Antonio (1427–1479).

Attempts by other sculptors to carve a marble David included an abruptly aborted attempt in 1464 by Agostino di Duccio on a huge block of marble that had been acquired by the Opera, and a short-lived engagement by Antonio Rossellino ten years later. However, it was Michelangelo who won the commission and finally managed to carve his colossal David out of the neglected block decades later. Michelangelo's piece was not installed on the cathedral either, but in front of the Palazzo della Signoria (later replaced by a copy at that location), once again because of David's vital symbolic meaning for the city-state.
