= Tommaso Gherardini =

Italian painter (1715–1797)

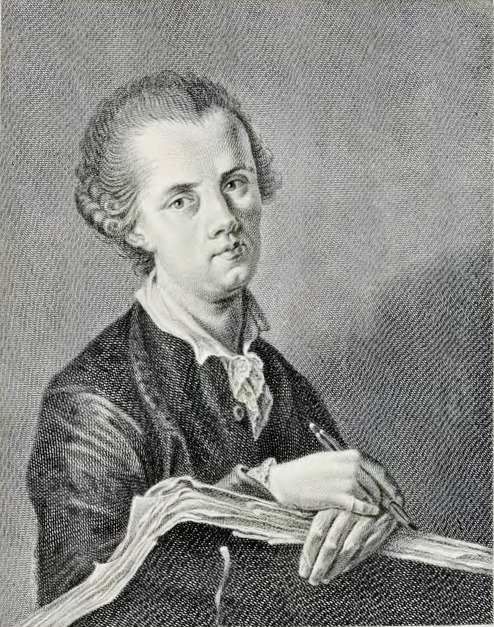
- Born: 21 December 1715; Florence
- Died: 1797 (aged 81–82); Florence
- Occupation: Painter

Tommaso Gherardini (21 December 1715 – 1797) was an Italian painter, mainly of Rococo fresco decorations.

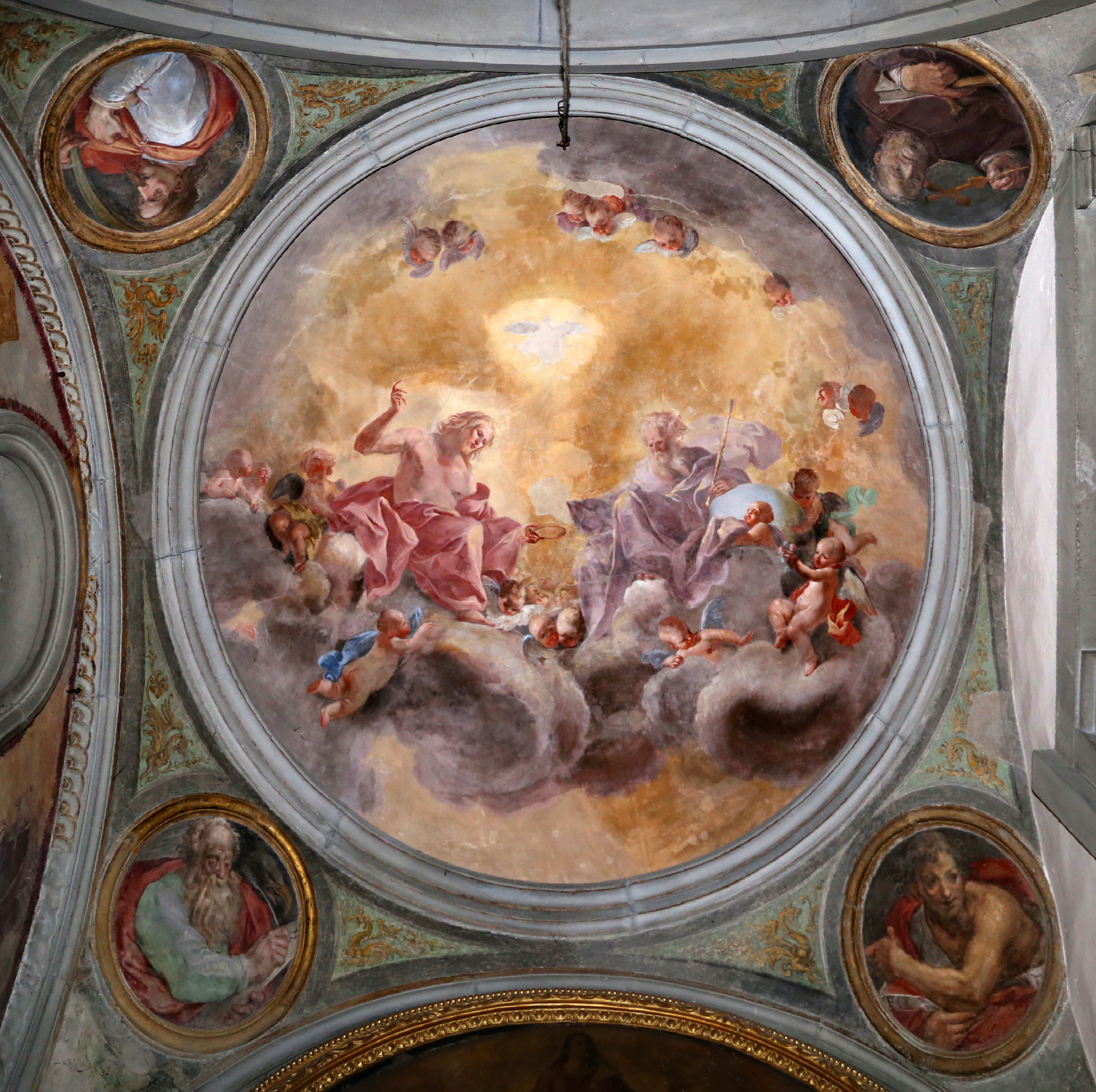
Santa Trinita, fresco for church of Santa Felicita, Florence.

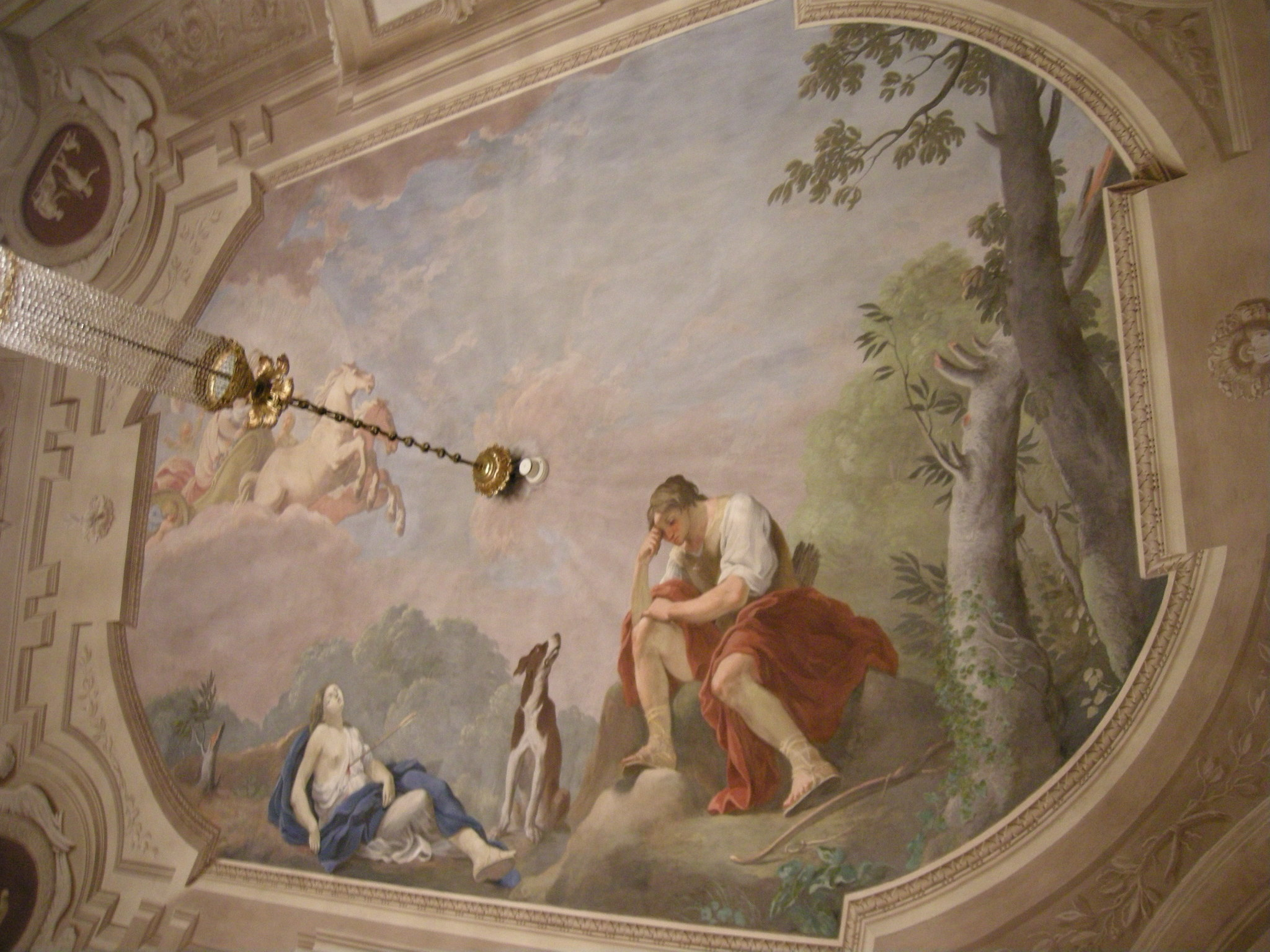
Ceiling fresco at Palazzo Compagni in Florence, in collaboration with Giuseppe Antonio Fabbrini.

== Biography ==
He was born in Florence, where he was a pupil of Vincenzo Meucci. He also traveled to Bologna and Venice to study at the respective academies. He painted a hall of the Gallery of the Uffizi and also in the Imperial palace of Vienna
