= David (Donatello, bronze) =

Sculpture by Donatello

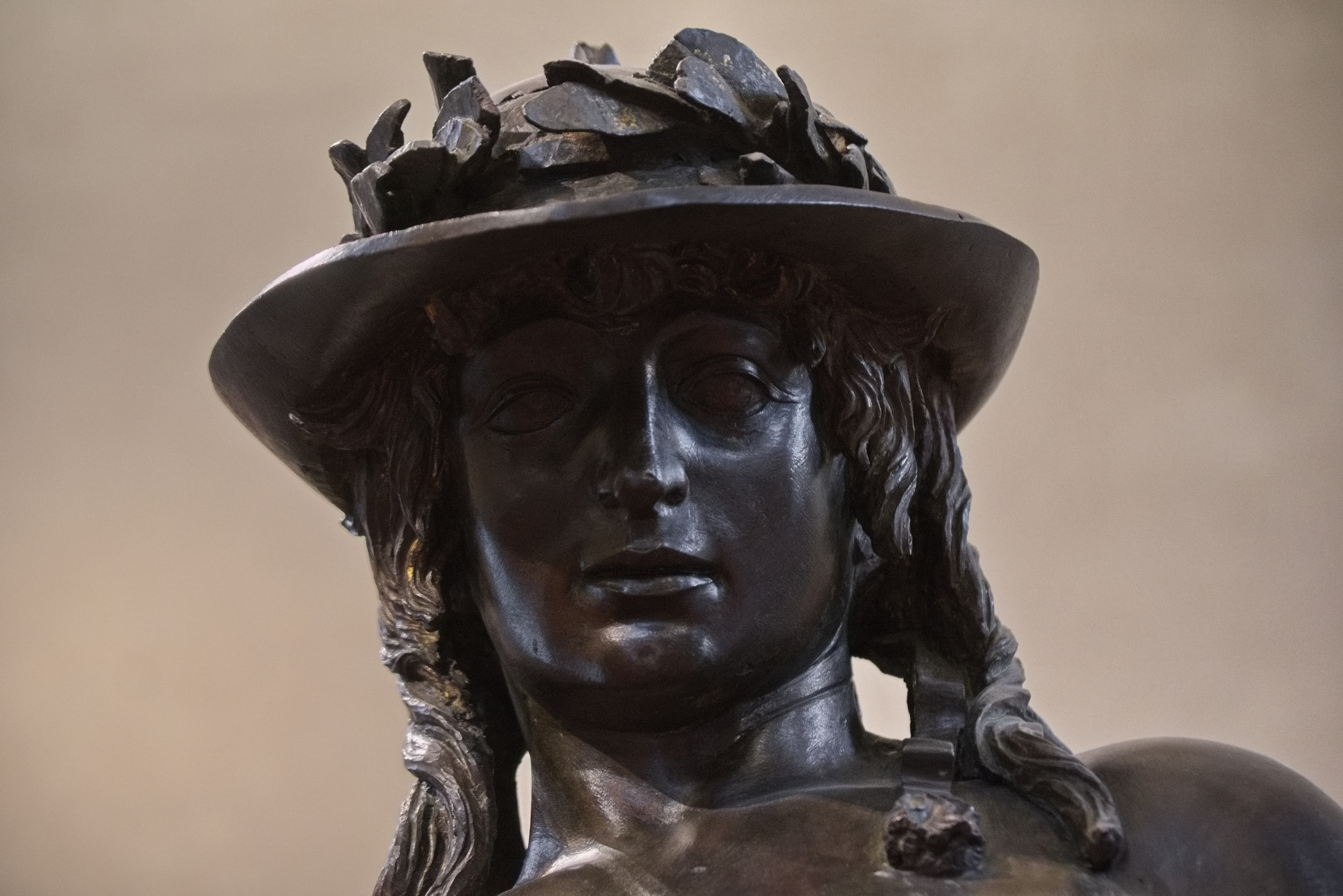
- Donatello, David, bronze, 1435–1440, Florence, Bargello, detail
- Artist: Donatello
- Year: c. 1440s
- Subject: David
- Dimensions: 158 cm (62 in)
- Location: Bargello, Florence

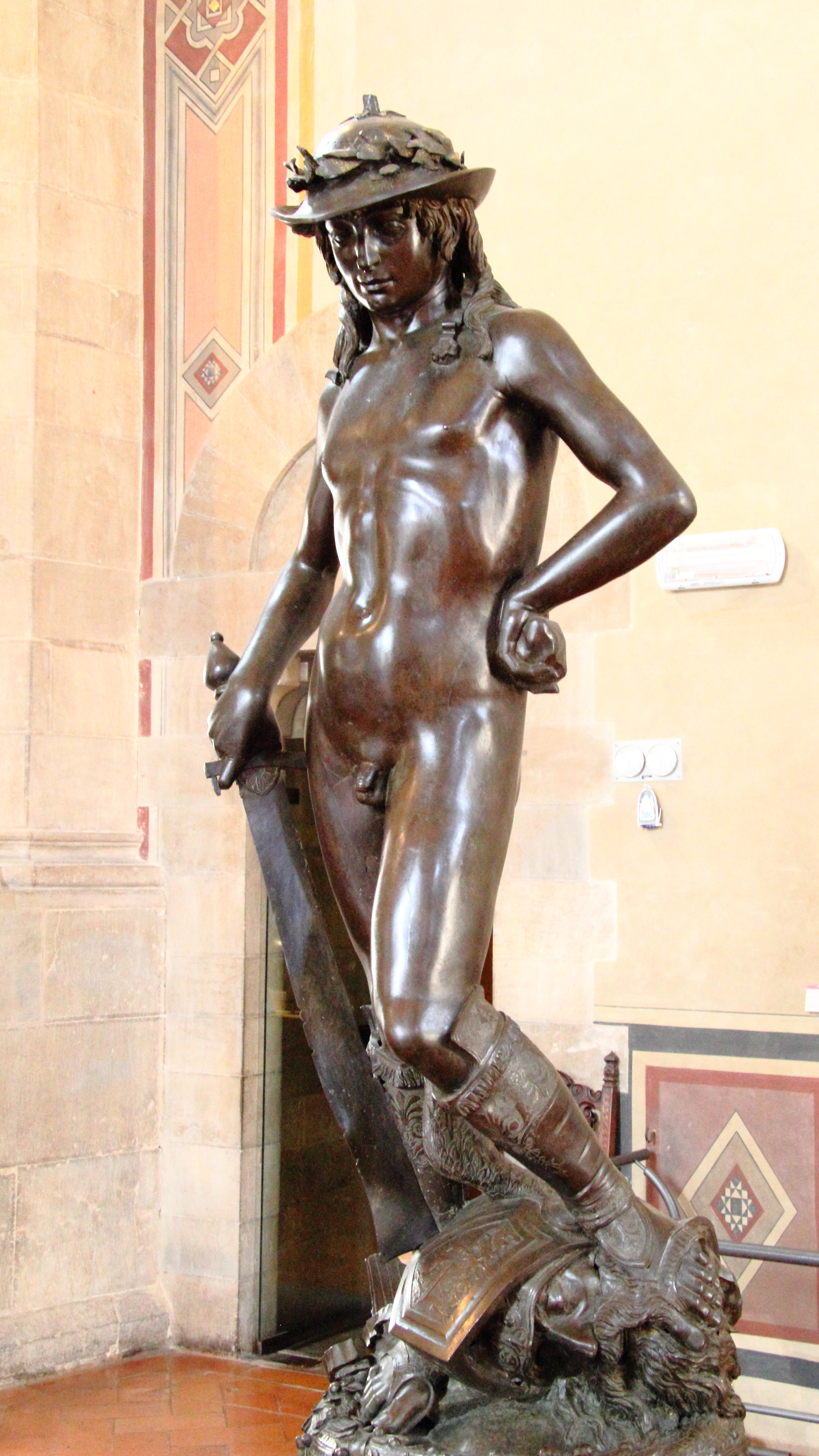
Donatello, the bronze David (1440s?), Bargello Florence, h.158 cm

David is a bronze statue of the biblical hero by the Italian Early Renaissance sculptor Donatello, probably made in the 1440s, and now in the Bargello, Florence. Nude except for helmet and boots, it is famous as the first unsupported standing work of bronze cast during the Renaissance, and the first freestanding nude male sculpture made since antiquity. It depicts David with an enigmatic smile, posed with his foot on Goliath's severed head just after defeating the giant. The youth is completely naked, apart from a laurel-topped hat and boots, and holds Goliath's sword.

The creation of the work is undocumented. Most scholars assume the statue was commissioned by Cosimo de' Medici, but the date of its creation is unknown and widely disputed; suggested dates vary from the 1420s to the 1460s (Donatello died in 1466), with the majority opinion recently falling in the 1440s, when the new Medici Palace (now called the Palazzo Medici Riccardi) designed by Michelozzo was under construction.

Decades earlier, Donatello worked on a marble statue of David. Both are now in the Museo Nazionale del Bargello in Florence. The bronze remains his most famous work, and was made for a secular context, commissioned by the Medici family. The iconography of the bronze David follows that of the marble David: a young hero stands with weapon in hand, the severed head of his enemy at his feet. Visually, however, this statue is startlingly different. David is both physically delicate and remarkably androgynous. The head has been said to have been inspired by classical sculptures of Antinous, the favourite of the Emperor Hadrian, renowned for his beauty. The statue's physique, contrasted with the large sword in hand, shows that David has overcome Goliath not by physical prowess, but through God. The boy's nakedness further implies the idea of the presence of God, contrasting the youth with the heavily-armoured giant. David is presented uncircumcised, which is customary for male nudes in Italian Renaissance art.

== The biblical text ==
The story of David and Goliath comes from 1 Samuel 17. The Israelites are at war with the Philistines, whose champion – Goliath – repeatedly offers to meet the Israelites' best warrior in single combat to decide the whole battle. None of the trained Israelite soldiers are brave enough to fight the giant Goliath, until David – a shepherd boy who is too young to be a soldier – accepts the challenge. Saul, the Israelite leader, offers David armour and weapons, but the boy is untrained and refuses them. Instead, he goes out with his sling, and confronts the enemy. He hits Goliath in the head with a stone, knocking the giant down, and then grabs Goliath's sword and cuts off his head. The Philistines withdraw as agreed and the Israelites are saved. David's special strength comes from God, and the story illustrates the triumph of good over evil.

== History ==
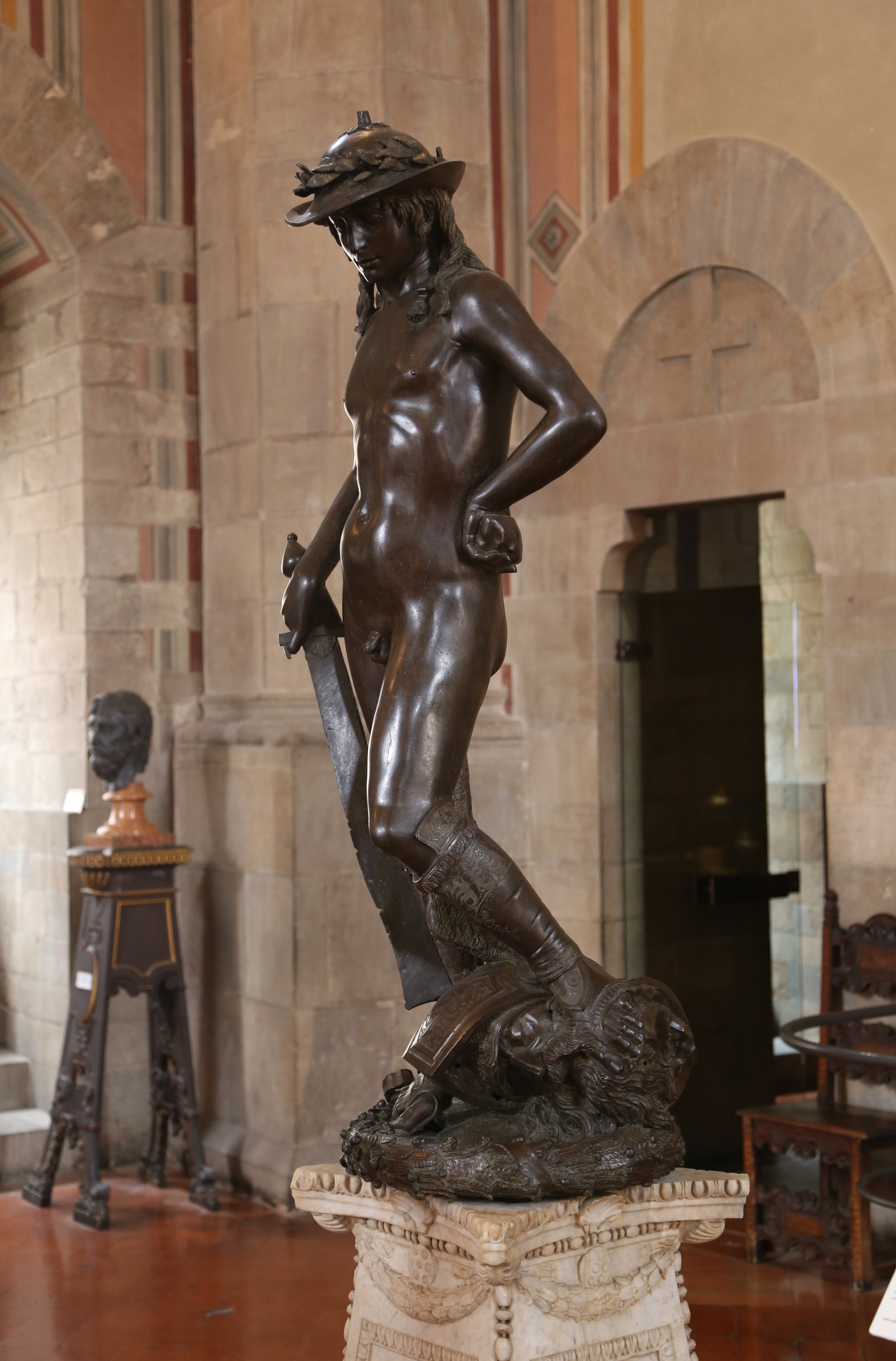
Another view of the David.

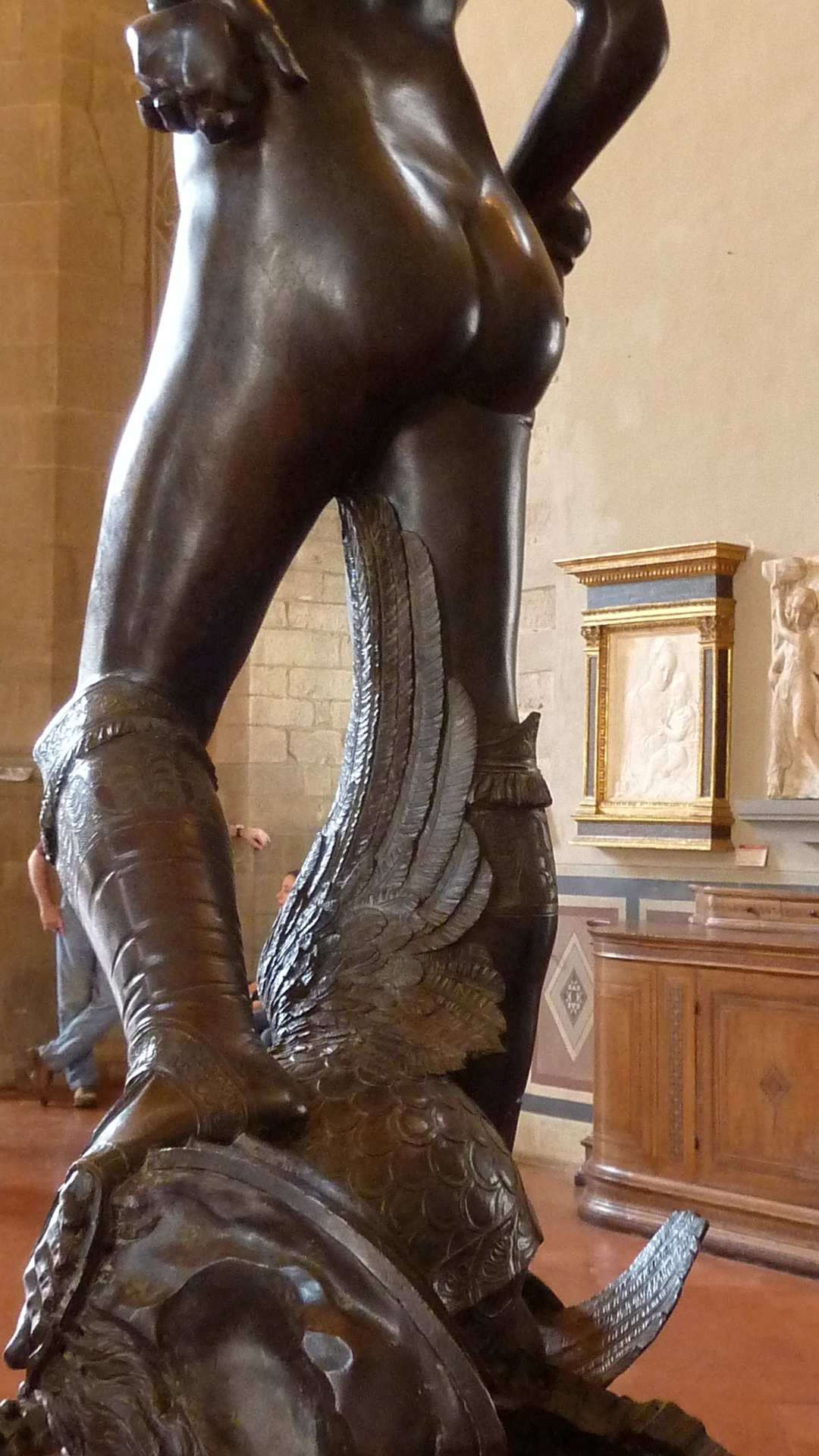
Back view of the buttocks of the David in the Museo Nazionale del Bargello, Florence.

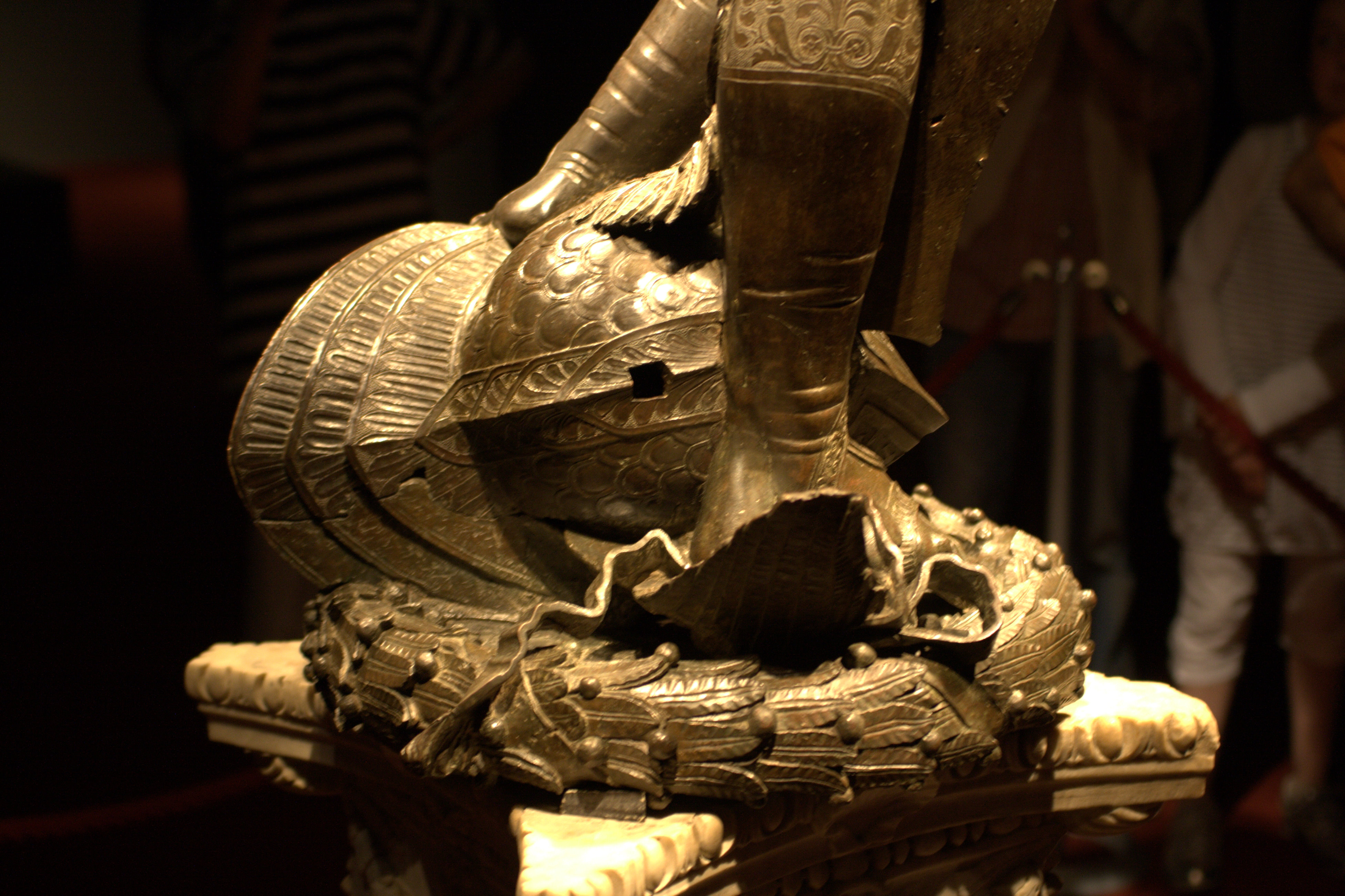
Detail of the base.

3-D model of the bronze statue (click to rotate).

According to one theory, it was commissioned by the Medici family in the 1430s to be placed in the center of the courtyard of the old Medici Palace. Alternatively it may have been made for that position in the new Palazzo Medici, where it was placed later, which would place the commission in the mid-1440s or even later. The statue is only recorded there by 1469. The Medici family were exiled from Florence in 1494, and the statue was moved to the courtyard of the Palazzo della Signoria along with Donatello's bronze Judith, which had an equal topic and potent symbolic meaning. The David lost its place (and its column) in the middle of the courtyard to a fountain in the 1450s and was installed in a niche flanking the doorway near the stairs, where the Judith stood since the early 1500s.

In the 17th century, the David was moved to the Palazzo Pitti, then to the Uffizi in 1777, and then finally, in 1865, to the Museo Nazionale del Bargello, where it remains today.

According to Vasari, the statue stood on a column designed by Desiderio da Settignano in the middle of the courtyard of the old Palazzo Medici; an inscription seems to have explained the statue's significance as a political monument. A quattrocento manuscript containing the text of the inscription is probably an earlier reference to the statue; unfortunately the manuscript is not dated. Although a political meaning for the statue is widely accepted, what that meaning is has been a matter of considerable debate among scholars.

=== Reception ===
No contemporary responses to the David have been found. Nevertheless, the fact that the statue was placed in the main government building of the Republic of Florence in the 1490s suggests that, at least by then, it was not viewed as controversial. In the early 16th century, the Herald of the Signoria mentioned the sculpture in an unsettling light: "The David in the courtyard is not a perfect figure because its right leg is tasteless." By mid-century Vasari was describing the statue as so naturalistic that it must have been cast from a live model. Modern 20th- and 21st-century art historians have not been able to reach a consensus on the correct interpretation.

Goliath's beard curls around David's sandaled foot, as if the young hero is running his toes through his dead opponent's hair. Goliath is wearing a winged helmet. David's right foot stands firmly on the short right wing, while the left wing, considerably longer, extends up his right leg to his groin.

The figure has been interpreted in a variety of ways. One has been to suggest that Donatello was homosexual and that he was expressing that sexual attitude through this statue. A second is to suggest that the work refers to homosocial values in Florentine society without expressing Donatello's personal tendencies. A third interpretation is that David represents Donatello's effort to create a unique version of the male nude, to exercise artistic licence rather than copy the classical models that had thus far been the sources for the depiction of the male nude in Renaissance art.

=== Identification ===
The traditional identification of the figure was questioned in 1939 by Jenő Lányi, with an interpretation leaning toward ancient mythology, the hero's helmet especially suggesting Hermes or Mercury. A number of scholars since have followed Lányi, sometimes referring to the statue as David-Mercury. If the figure were indeed meant to represent Mercury, it may be supposed that he stands atop the head of the vanquished giant Argus Panoptes. However, all quattrocento references to the statue identify it as David.

=== Restoration ===
The statue underwent restoration from June 2007 to November 2008. This was the first time the statue had ever been restored, but concerns about layers of "mineralised waxings" on the surface of the bronze led to the 18-month intervention. The statue was scraped with scalpels (on the non-gilded areas) and lasered (on the gilded areas) to remove surface build-up.

=== Copies and influence ===
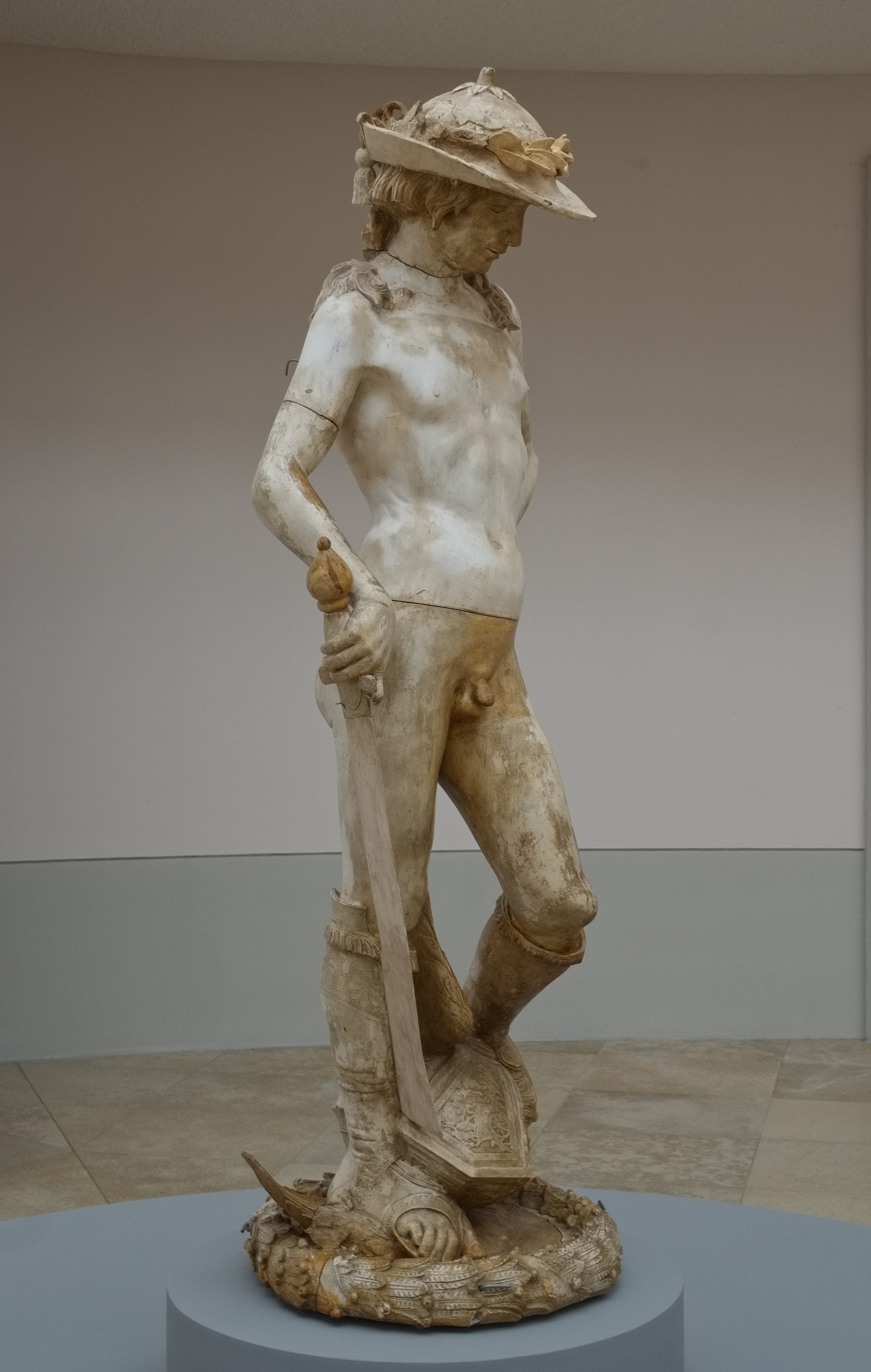
After Donatello, David, before 1879, plaster, shellacked, Gipsformerei of Staatliche Museen, Berlin (inv 2204).

David continued to be a subject of great interest for Italian patrons and artists. Later representations of the biblical hero include

- Desiderio da Settignano, Martelli David, marble, c. 1462–64, finished by someone else, possibly by Bertoldo di Giovanni(?), c. 1465–70, Washington, National Gallery of Art
- Verrocchio's, partly gilded bronze, c. 1468–70, Bargello, Florence
- Antonio del Pollaiuolo, panel painting, c. 1470, Gemäldegalerie, Berlin
- Bartolomeo Bellano, ormolu bronzetto, 1470s, Metropolitan Museum of Art, New York
- Domenico Ghirlandaio, fresco, c. 1485, S. Maria Novella, Florence
- Michelangelo's David, marble, 1501–1504, Accademia, Florence
- Bernini's David, marble, 1623–24, Galleria Borghese, Rome.

Following the model of Donatello's David for other figures are for example Pollaiuolo's bronzetto of Hercules at Rest (c. 1480), two figures of Andrea del Castagno's cycle of Illustrous Men and Women from the Villa Carducci at Legnaia (detached frescoes, 1448–49, Uffizi, Florence). Pontormo and Francesco da Sangallo are among the artists who made sketches of the bronze David, that have been preserved (c. 1514 and 1455 resp., Uffizi).

Plaster casts taken from original sculptures that were otherwise unobtainable, were bought by museums and other collections; some had their own plaster workshops, like the Staatliche Museen in Berlin. Among the 7000 casts the workshop produced since 1819 is also a copy of the bronze David, that was taken from the original some time before 1880, and served itself again for over a dozen plaster copies in the last century alone.

The Cast Courts of the Victoria and Albert Museum in London has also a David in their huge plaster collection, although with a broken sword. Full-size white marble copies are to be found in the Temperate House at the Royal Botanic Gardens, Kew, Surrey (near London), and at the Slater Museum at the Norwich Free Academy in Norwich, Connecticut, United States.

== See also ==
- David di Donatello film awards
- Italian Renaissance sculpture

== Bibliography ==
- Avery, Charles; Sarah Blake McHam (2013) [2003]. "Donatello". Grove Art Online. Oxford University Press.

External videos
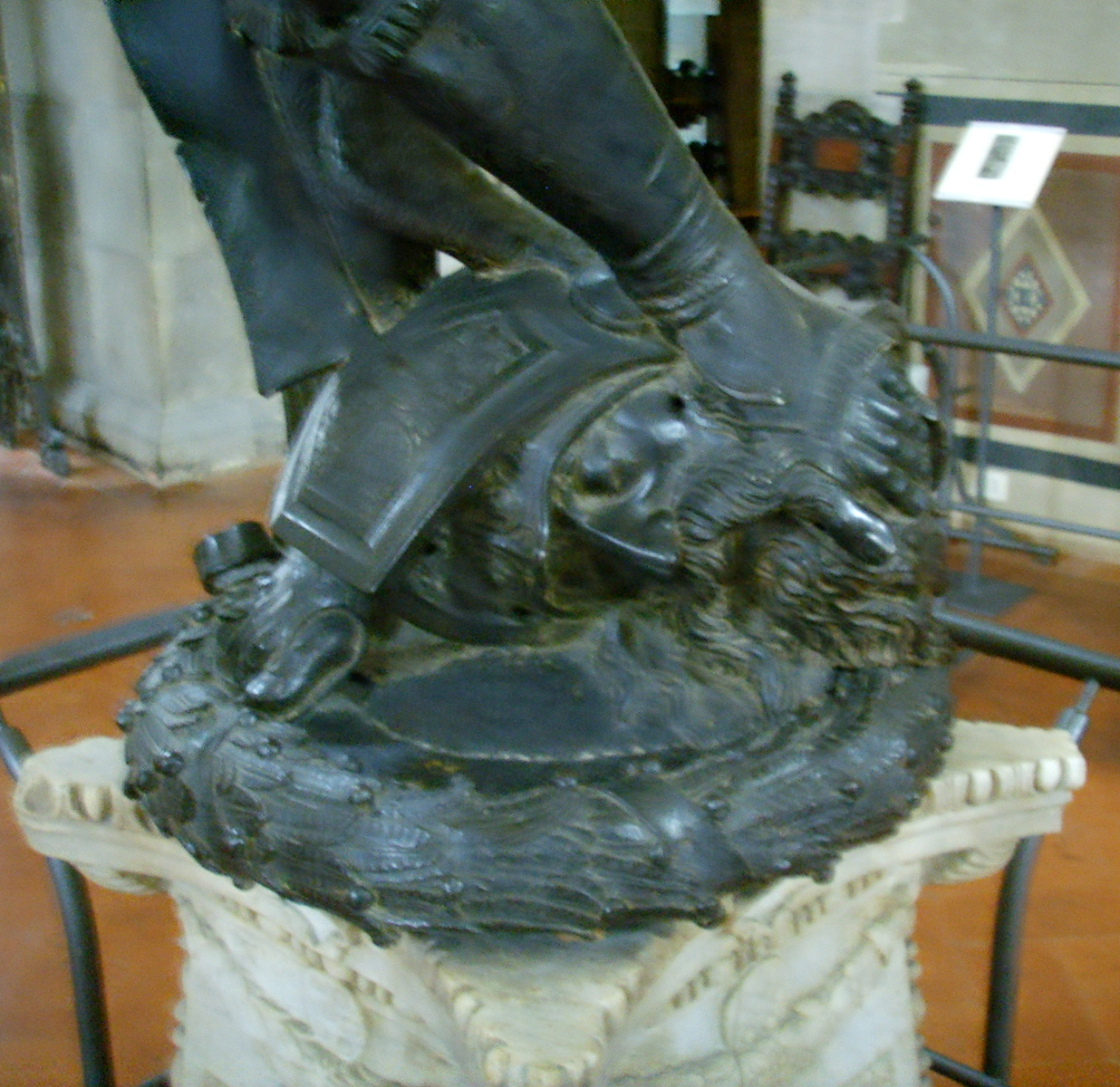
- Donatello's David, Smarthistory

- Janson, H.W. (1980) [1957]. The Sculpture of Donatello. Princeton: Princeton University Press. ISBN 978-0691003177.
- Pope-Hennessy, John (1996) [1958]. Italian Renaissance Sculpture. An Introduction to Italian Sculpture. Vol. 2 (4th ed.). London: Phaidon. ISBN 0-7148-3015-1.
- Museo Nazionale del Bargello (1985). Omaggio a Donatello, 1386–1986 (in Italian). S.P.E.S. – Studio per Edizioni Scelte.
- Poeschke, Joachim (1990). Donatello and his World: Sculpture of the Italian Renaissance. New York: Harry N Abrams. ISBN 978-0810932111.
- Caglioti, Francesco, ed. (2022). Donatello. The Renaissance. Text by Laura Cavazzini, Andrea De Marchi, Gabriele Fattorini, Aldo Galli, Neville Rowley. Venice: Marsilio Arte. ISBN 979-12-5463-006-8.
- Rowley, Neville, ed. (2022). Donatello. Erfinder der Renaissance. Text by Francesco Caglioti, Laura Cavazzini, Aldo Galli, Neville Rowley. Leipzig: E.A. Seemann. ISBN 978-3-86502-482-4.
