= Antonio Marini =

Italian painter

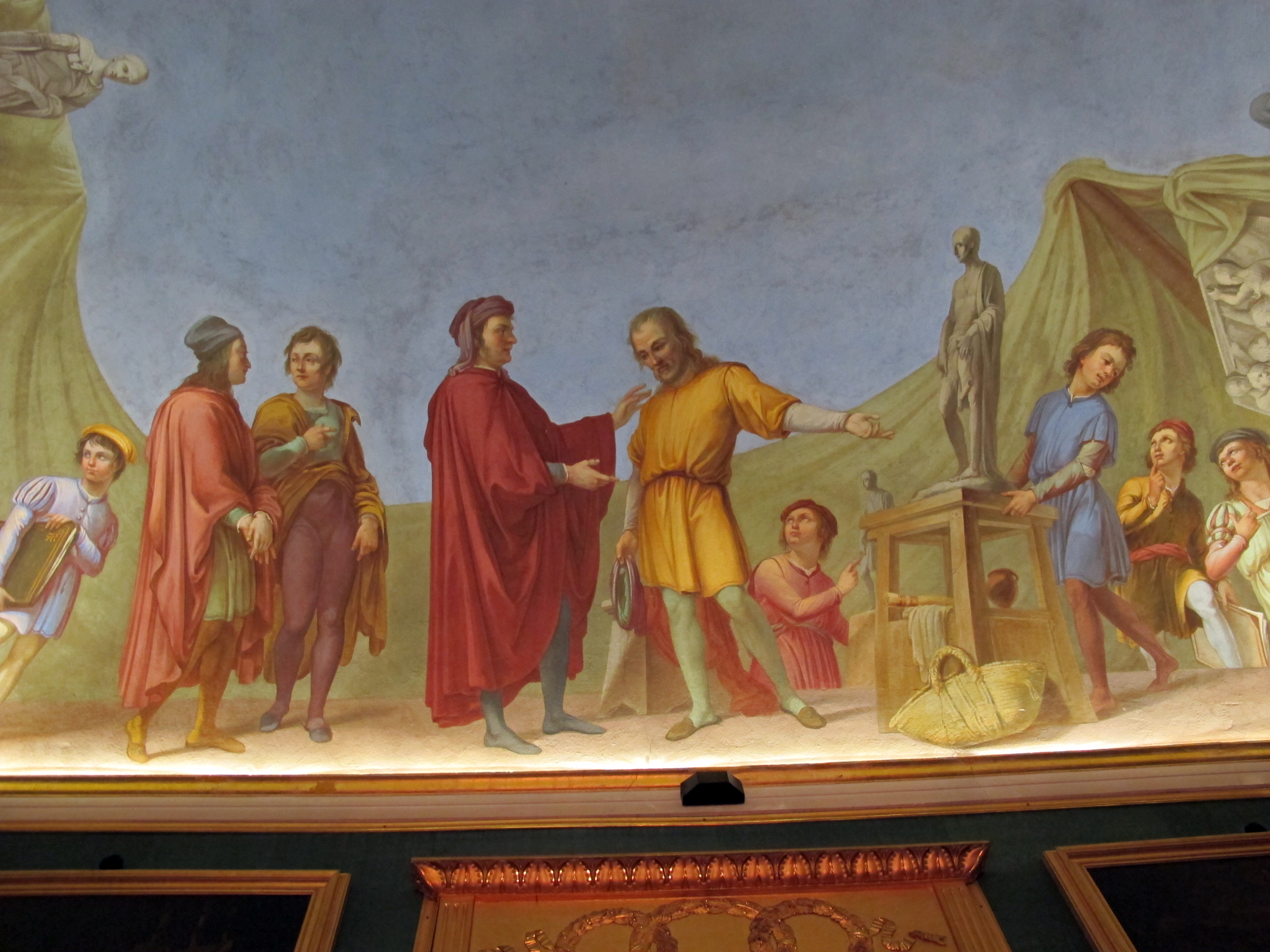
Frescos in Casa Martelli, Florence

Antonio Marini (27 May 1788 – 10 September 1861) was an Italian painter, mainly of sacred subjects for churches in Tuscany. He is distinct from Antonio Maria Marini from Venice.

== Biography ==
He was born in Prato. Early in his career, he painted frescoes, including one depicting Zeus in Olympus, for the Esterhazy Palace in Vienna. He developed an anachronistic style that imitated quattrocento painters, learned in part from his activity restoring such works. He is described by 1836 by the contemporary Luigi Mussini as having begun to paint Madonnas weakly imitated after the neo-purism of the (pre-Raphaelite) Germans such as Overbeck and his associates.

Among his frescoes are those depicting: Sacred and Profane Music, Poetry, and a Choir of Putti (1852) in a salon of the house of Count Guicciardini and in the Palazzo Martelli in Florence. He painted the frescoes of the Life of St Anne for the chapel dei Giuntini in San Giuseppe. Among his canvases in oil is one of the Virgin about to embrace her Jesus as a child (1843) and a Glory of the Virgin (1847) for the church of Santa Maria delle Carceri in Prato.

Marini was employed in the restoration (1840) of the frescoes in the Palazzo del Podesta of Prato.

His wife, Giulia Marini, painted landscapes and still lifes). He died in Florence.
