= Giulio Alessandrini (parasitologist) =

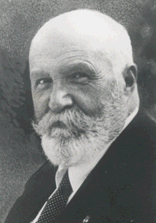

Giulio Alessandrini (25 May 1866 – 13 April 1954) was an Italian bacteriologist and parasitologist. He worked as a malariologist and was involved in the management of malaria in the Pontine marshes. He became a professor of medical parasitology at the University of Rome.

Alessandrini was born in Montalto di Castro (Viterbo) and went to study medicine in Rome. After graduating in 1891 he worked at the University of Rome, assisting Antonio Carruccio. He was the first to hold a university teaching qualification (“libera docenza”) in medical parasitology and became a lecturer of medical parasitology in 1904 and when a chair was created in parasitology, he was the first holder in 1924. He studied the biology of Ancylostoma duodenale and was involved in management of the parasite among workers on the Bologna-Florence railway line from 1919 to 1932. He also discovered Necator americanus in Italy and also examined the fly Piophila casei. He was invited to Argentina to attend the Malaria Congress in Buenos Aires in 1926. The same year he was recruited to help in the reclamation of the Pontine marshes and made director of the anti-malaria commission. This group was disbanded in 1933 when Mussolini moved the anti-malaria work to the Red Cross but Alessandrini was placed in-charge of managing the region. In 1928 he became a full professor of medical parasitology. He was also appointed to the Senate of Italy in 1939. He died in Rome.

Alessandrini book on parasitology of man and domestic animals first published in 1929 was a standard text for medical and veterinary students for a long time.
