= Giuseppe Antonio Fabrini =

Italian painter

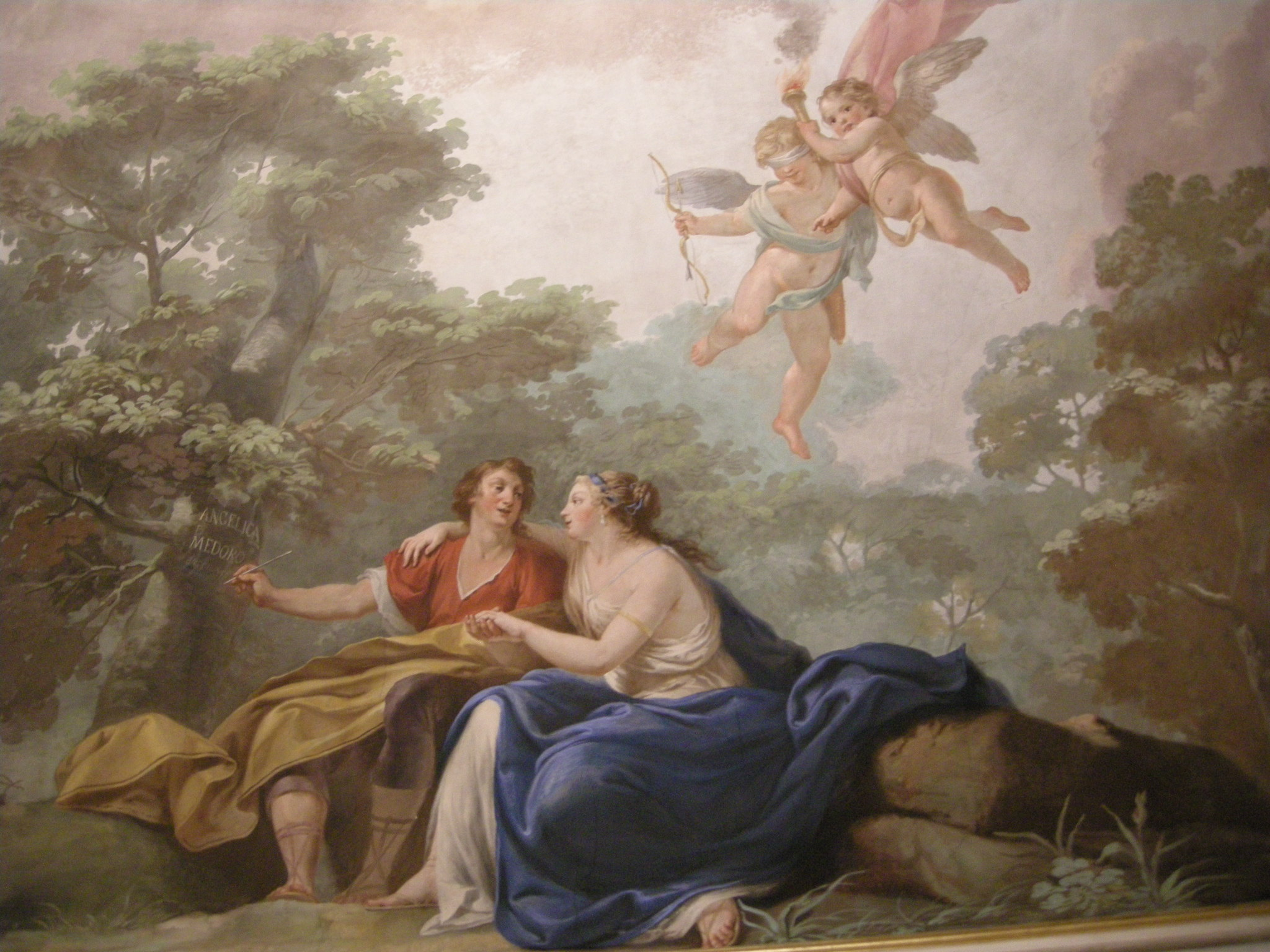
A fresco by Fabrini showing a scene from Orlando Furioso in the Sala dell'orlando furioso, Palazzo Compagni, Florence.

Giuseppe Antonio Fabrini or Fabbrini (c.1740 - c. 1795) was a painter from Florence, Italy, working in fresco and oil on canvas. He studied under Anton Raphael Mengs and is known to have worked in Italy, whilst his works were also collected by the British nobleman George Clavering-Cowper, 3rd Earl Cowper for his country house at Panshanger in Hertfordshire.
