= Giovanni Battista Ercolani =

Italian physician and veterinarian (1817–1883)

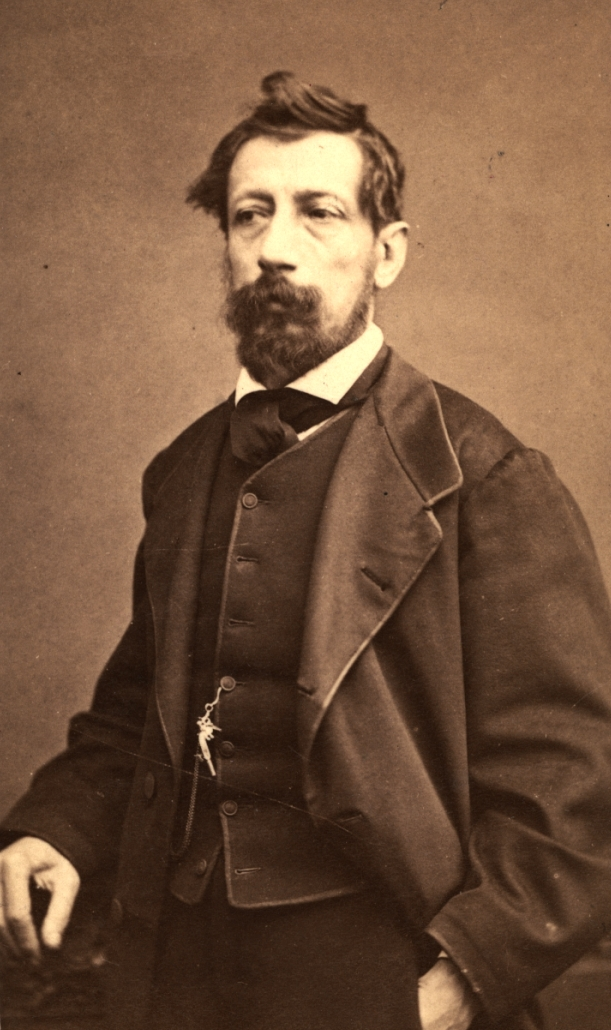

Giovanni Battista Ercolani (27 December 1817 – 16 November 1883) was an Italian veterinarian and professor of anatomy at the University of Bologna and politician. He was a Darwinian and published extensively on animal diseases and parasitology.

Ercolani was born in Bologna to lawyer Count Filippo Leone and Rosalba Cesarina Lisi. Like other nobility of the period he was privately tutored at home. He became interested in the natural sciences and studied medicine at the University of Bologna and graduated in 1840. He became an assistant to Antonio Alessandrini in anatomy and in 1842 he was made a fellow of the Academy of Sciences in Bologna. He became a prosector in comparative anatomy in 1846–47. He supported Alessandrini, a republican even though he was a moderate liberal. Along with Marco Minghetti he helped found a newspaper called Il Felsineo. In 1848 he was elected to the health council in Rome and was deputed by Bologna to the Roman Constituent Assembly where he voted against many radical moves of the Roman Republic. When papal power returned in 1849 he lost his position. He lived in Tuscany and later in Pistoia and still later Florence. In 1851 he lived in Piedmont and obtained a position in the Turin veterinary school. In 1852 he established, Giornale di Veterinaria, a veterinary journal along with Michele Lessona. He became a director of the school of veterinary medicine in 1859 and helped establish museums of anatomy and veterinary pathology. He was appointed knight of the Order of Saints Maurice and Lazarus in 1859. He retired from public life to Bologna following the death of his only daughter Cesarina in 1863. He later took up a position at the veterinary school in Bologna and in 1871 he was made perpetual secretary of the Academy of Sciences. In 1873 he became dean of medical surgery and veterinary medicine and served as a rector between 1878 and 1883. He also studied the history of veterinary medicine and left a large collection of antique books on the topic. A marble bust of him was placed in the University of Bologna and a street is named after him.
