= Milena Ercolani =

Sammarinese poet and novelist

Milena Ercolani (born 19 September 1963) is a Sammarinese poet and novelist. She is a primary school teacher. Ercolani has represented San Marino at numerous literary events around the world. Her work has been awarded a number of prizes. She is president of the Sammarina Cultural Association.

== Life ==
Ercolani is a Sammarinese poet and novelist. She works as a primary school teacher. Ercolani has represented San Marino at numerous literary events around the world.

Ercolani has written since childhood, and has also produced stories for children. She is the president of the Sammarina Cultural Association, which promotes the artistic work of San Marino and the surrounding region.

Ercolani's work has won several prizes. She won the Calabria Domani International Competition, was awarded the Padus Amoenus International Poetry and Narrative Prize, and won the La Montagnola National Poetry and Narrative Competition. Her 2007 novel Celesta was awarded second prize in the Concorso Internazionale di Poesia Prosa e Arti Figurative, awarded by the cultural association "La finestra eterea" of Cinesello Balsamo in 2013.

Ercolani is affiliated with the Dogana Social Center, which organizes literature and poetry events. She co-founded the literary and cultural association "Il Cenacolo" with a group of artists within the centre. She is a member of the Dante Alighieri Society of San Marino.

== Works ==
Ercolani's works include:

- Fuggendo dal Regno di Niente (poetry) (1993)
- Mareggiate (poetry) (1995)
- Donna in mare (poetry) (1996)
- Il canto della crisalide (poetry) (2005)
- Celesta (novel) (2007)
- Figlie della luna (novel) (2009)
- Angiolino e Maria...una storia d'amore(novel) (2010) – (2°edizione 2025)
- Quando ti scrivevo Amore (poesie ) (2010)
- Antologia Poetica (poetry) (2011)
- Coccole di zucchero filato (poetry) (2015)
- Androceo – Storia di Virus e di Stelle (novel) (2020)
- Come uno squalo in un ruscello (poetry) (2022)
- La coda della lucertola(novel), Filippini edizione (2024).
