= Antonio Alessandrini =

Italian zoologist

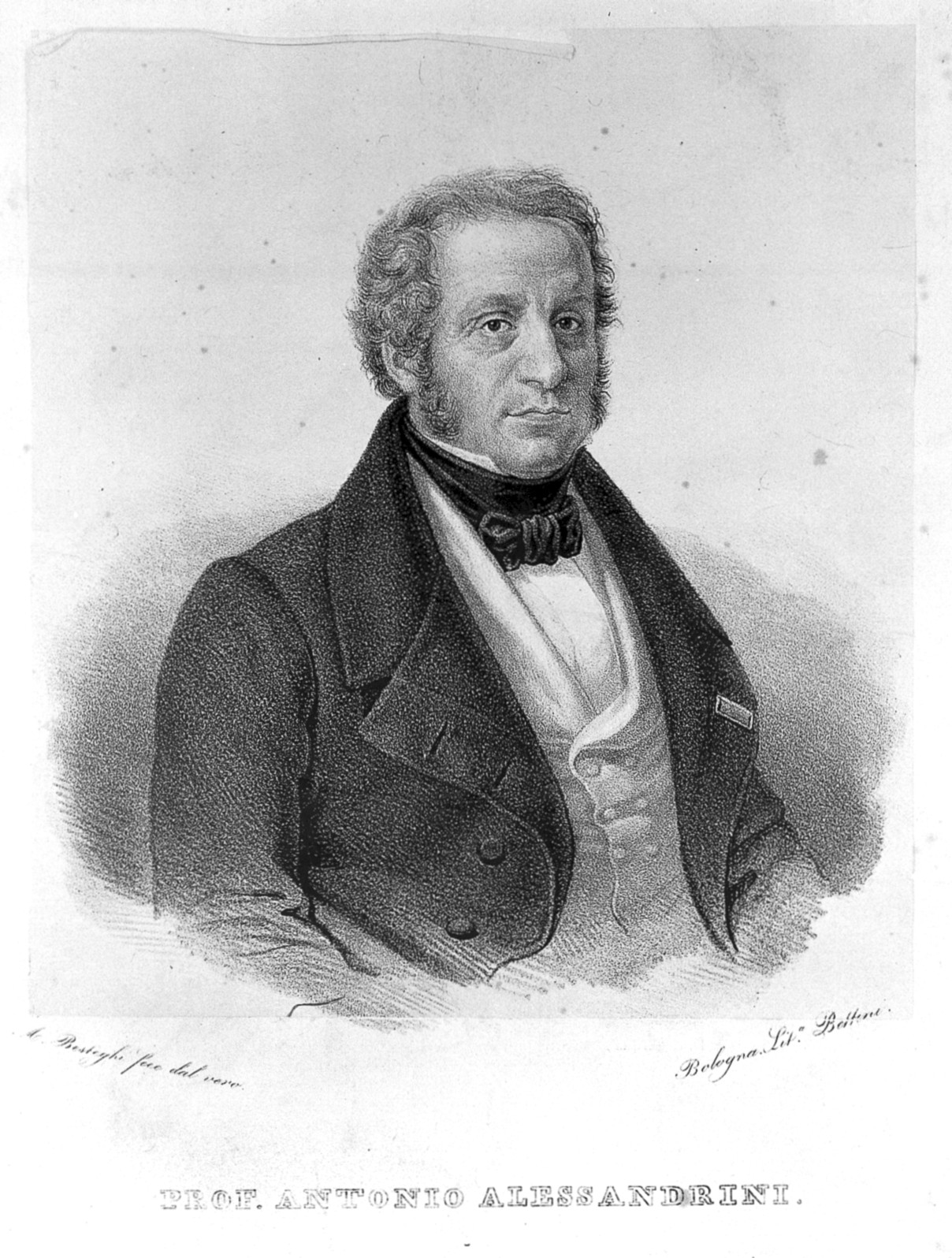
- Born: 30 July 1786; Bologna
- Died: 6 April 1861 (aged 74); Bologna
- Occupations: Scientist, college professor

Antonio Alessandrini (30 July 1786, Bologna – 6 April 1861 in the same city) was an Italian scientist.

Antonio Alessandrini taught comparative anatomy and veterinary science at the University of Bologna. He was president of the Accademia delle Scienze of the city and of the Zoology Division of the Ottava Riunione degli Italiani Scienziati in Genoa (1846).

He published numerous articles in zoology and parasitology and was particularly interested in the physiology of the silkworm. He had large collections of specimens and anatomical diagrams and models, which he displayed in a museum of comparative anatomy and in a paleontology museum. Giovanni Battista Ercolani was an assistant to Alessandrini.

== Works ==
- (1838) Observazioni antomiche intorno a diverse specie di entozoarii de genere Filaria. Nuovi Annali delle Science Naturali 1:1-17.
