= Parco Emilio Alessandrini =

Park in Milan, Italy

Coordinates: 45°26′59.49″N 9°13′38.33″E

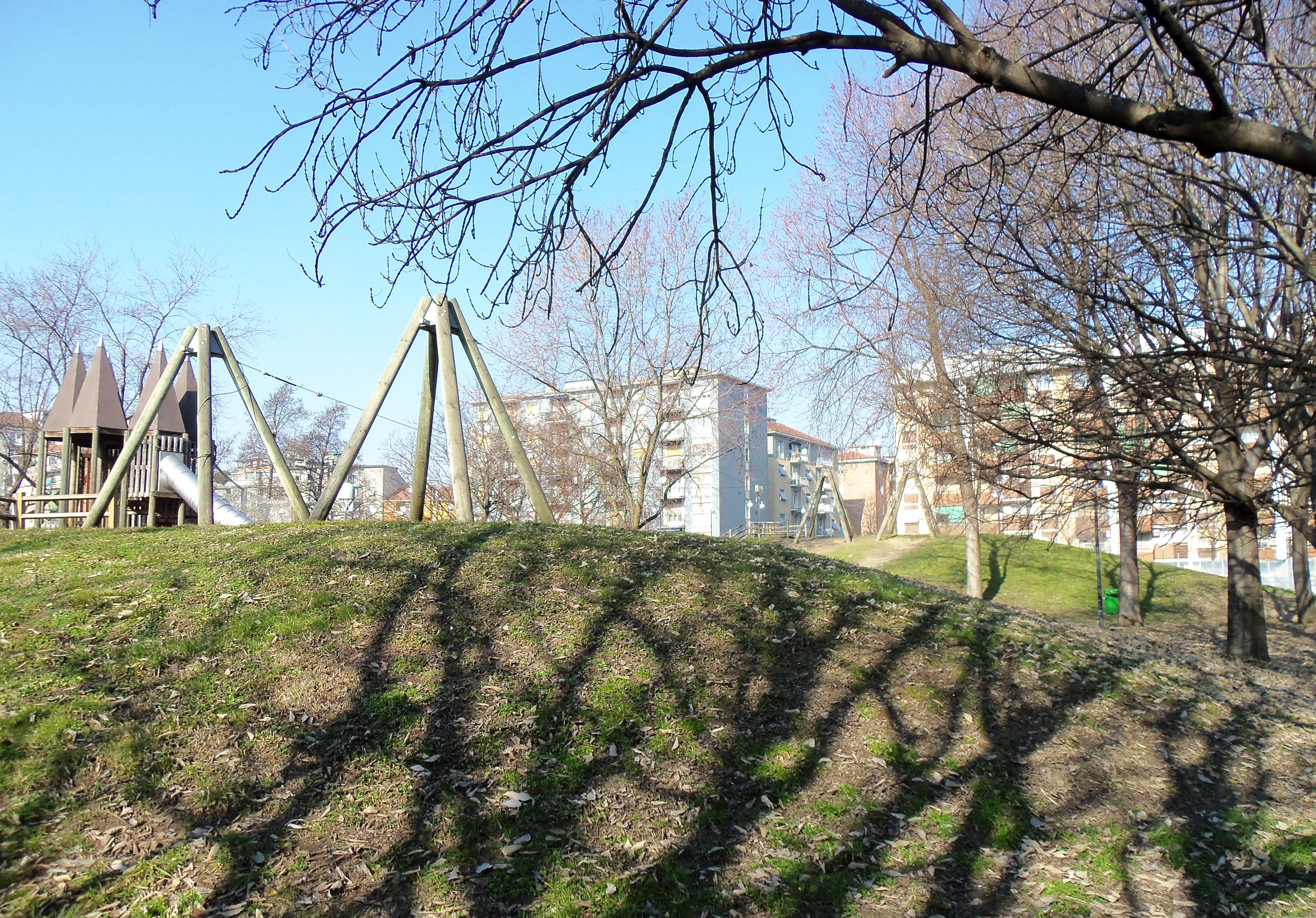
A photo of the park

Parco Emilio Alessandrini is a memorial park in Milan, Italy, dedicated to Emilio Alessandrini, an Italian judge, assassinated by Prima Linea in 1979. It covers an area of 6.65 ha (66.500 m²). As of 2025, new complaints about the poor conditions of the park were filed with the city government.
