= Marjorie Alessandrini =

French journalist (1946–2014)

Marjorie Alessandrini (3 April 1946 – 12 February 2014) was a French journalist, specializing in culture and the arts de vivres.

== Biography ==
Joëlle Marjorie Poissonnet was born "in a plane, above the Sahara" around Colomb-Béchar, French Algeria on April 3, 1946.

At 18, while a student in khâgne, she married Paul Alessandrini. In 1967, she began a doctoral thesis under the supervision of Georges Balandier, The Myth of the Plant-Man in French-language African and West Indian Literatures; she supported it in 1973.

In 1969, Paul had entered Rock & Folk, Marjorie joined him there and became known by writing mainly on comics and music. At Albin Michel editions, she coordinated from 1974 to 1976 a collection of monographs devoted to comics, "Graffiti", in which eight titles appeared, including her Crumb in 1974, then supervised in 1978 a fairly complete Encyclopedia of comics on the United States. Unis and the French-speaking authors of the 1970s, which was the subject of an expanded reissue in 1986. In 1980, she published a work dedicated to rockers, Le Rock au feminine.

With Calmann-Lévy editions, she signed L'Année du Rock with her husband from 1982 to 1987. She also published two books on London at Autrement in 1984 and 1986.

Head of section from 1980 to 1984 at Le Matin, she was editor-in-chief at Paris-Magazine from 1985 to 1988, then at L'Obs de Paris, a Parisian supplement to the Nouvel Observateur, from 1988. She then became editor-in-chief of the lifestyle, travel and fashion sections, a position she held until her retirement in 2009. From 1992 to 1994, she produced, directed and presented the program Week-end at the card on the Paris Première cable channel .

A specialist in Asia and travel literature, after her retirement, she ran two blogs on the Nouvel Observateur website: L'Esprit du Voyage (2009-2013) and Impressions d'Asie (2010-2013). She died of cancer on 12 February 2020 in Paris, at the age of 67.

== Works ==
- Crumb, Albin Michel, coll. « Graffiti », 1974 ISBN 2-226-00038-0.
- Encyclopédie des bandes dessinées (dir.), Albin Michel, 1978 ISBN 2-226-00701-6. Réédition augmentée en 1986.
- Le Rock au féminin, Albin Michel, 2000 ISBN 2-226-00959-0.
- L'Année du rock (avec Paul Alessandrini), Calmann-Levy, 5 vol., 1982–1987.
- Londres : 100 Ans de retard, 100 Ans d'avance (avec Paul Alessandrini), Autrement hors-série No. 6, 1984.
- Londres : Capitale des styles à la recherche d'une âme, Autrement, 1986 ISBN 2-86260151-9.
