= Donatello (catalogue of works) =

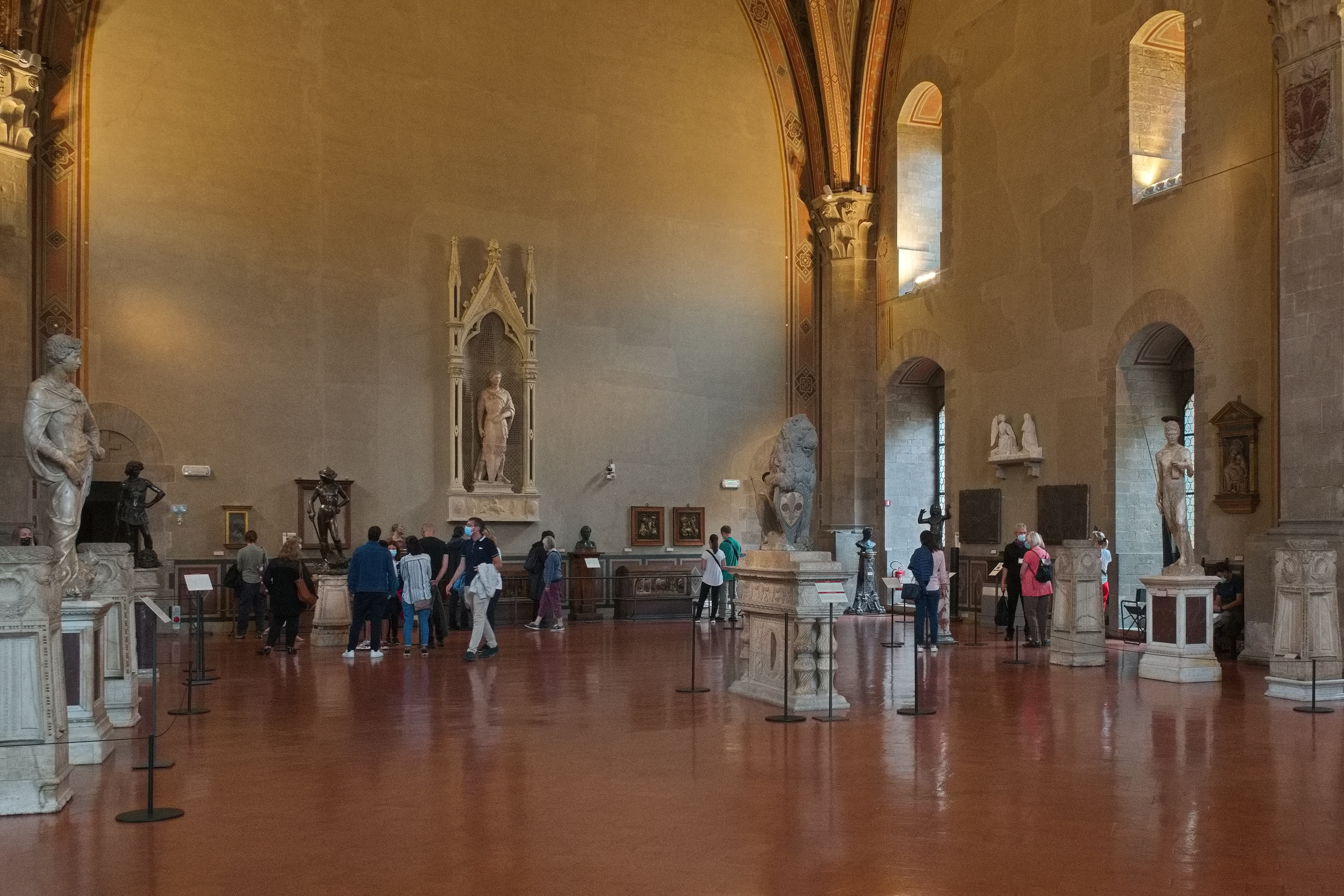
The Sala di Donatello of the Bargello in Florence, the museum with the largest and best collection of Donatello's work

The following catalog of works by the Florentine sculptor Donatello (born around 1386 in Florence; died on December 13, 1466, in Florence) is based on the monographs by H. W. Janson (1957), Ronald Lightbown (1980), and John Pope-Hennessy (1996), as well as the catalogs of the 2022/2023 exhibitions in Florence, Berlin and London. In the case of unsigned or documented works, the attributions and dates are, as is usual, based predominantly on stylistic criteria and analogies to secured works. Many of the works attributed to Donatello were created in collaboration with other artists and with specialists in specific techniques.

== About the table ==
The table is designed to be sorted in the best logical way possible, so that it can be used productively for searches, statistics and analysis (with many compromises; see below. The sorting function will also be available in the app sometime). Technical terms, places, etc., are only linked once at first appearance. The first table with Donatello's (more or less) secured œuvre specifies 77 entries of works of various sizes and oftentimes ensembles of sculptures.

=== Subject/Name ===
First of all, it must be said that almost none of Donatello's works at the time had an individual name or title (just as only a few were signed; sometimes they have inscriptions that were added later, as with the Campanile figures). In addition to the Habakkuk, which was quickly nicknamed Zuccone because of the figure's pumpkin-shaped bald head, the late Judith and the Dovizia on the main market square (today's Piazza della Repubblica) in Florence, which were unique at the time, to clearly identify a work, the addition of the place (or commissioner) and (if it was known) the artist's name was needed. Donatello's two statues of David are similarly exceptional cases; both were generally known to be the work of Donatello, but for the second, the bronze David for the Medici, it was necessary to differentiate by adding the location, the client or the material. Almost all the other sculptures were figures of Christ, the Madonna and the saints, which were ubiquitous subjects and comprised the entire iconographical canon of what could be represented up to that point in time.

The bronze David, the Pazzi Madonna and the Cavalcanti Annunciation are all so-called Notnamen, short names that have been created over time by art historians since the 19th century, which have become established (with variants) and, particularly in the case of popular works, have become established in general through art literature and cultural and travel guides. A very special case in this regard is the so-called Amor-Attis, Amor-At(t)ys and vice versa, or also Atys-Amorino, as Janson described it in his monograph, which is still fundamental to this day; the figure remains a mystery with its ambiguous ancient attributes. Another persistent enigma is of course the bronze David.

Perhaps contrary to expectations, in the table these Notnamen under "Subject/Name" follow (in italics) after a general descriptive name of the object (e.g. "Lion..., (Marzocco)"), so that all prophet figures, for example, or the five John the Baptists can be brought together. Likewise, all Madonnas with the Christ Child are referred to as "Madonna and Child" so that they can be compared; the Pazzi Madonna, for example, can be found as "Madonna and Child (Pazzi Madonna)".

Donatello's documented collaborators and assistants are then named in small boldface, followed by uncertain attributions, dates or functions in small, bold and italic, which is a reference to missing documentation. Separating the largely undisputed works attributed to Donatello from those secured by documents or omitting them entirely would not allow an overall view of his œuvre, to approximate the assumed simultaneous work on different genres and their chronological progression.

=== Form ===
Under "Form" statues can be separated from works in relief, although simultaneously all, e.g., niche figures can also be brought together.

=== Materials ===
Donatello worked with a wide variety of materials, most often in innovative ways. In his time and also due to Donatello, in addition to marble, the complex and expensive bronze and cheap, easy-to-handle fired clay (terracotta) became the essential materials. The stone used is almost exclusively white marble, especially for the early statues of the Cathedral of Florence, the works in rilievo stiacciato (shallow relief), the tombs and the two pulpits from the 1430s. Techniques for bronze had almost been lost; their revival is associated above all with Lorenzo Ghiberti, in his doors for the Florence Baptistery and the statues for Orsanmichele, (Note: The first bronze portal for the Baptistery was created by Andrea Pisano between 1330 and 1336, based on the model of the bronze doors by Bonanno Pisano from around 1180 at Pisa Cathedral, of which only the Porta San Ranieri has survived. For its implementation, bronze casters had to be appointed from Venice, one of the last places where the late Antique–Byzantine tradition dominated and the associated knowledge was still cultivated. In addition, Florence was in good economic shape at the beginning of the 14th century, but this was no longer the case for the next few decades due to plagues and wars.) (Note: Ghiberti's two sets of doors were created from 1403 and 1424 and from 1425 to 1452, respectively. The Saint John the Baptist of 1412–1416 for the Arte di Calimala (wool merchants) was the first bronze statue of this size since antiquity. This was followed by the Saint Matthew (1419–1423) and Saint Stephen (1425–1428) for the (equally influential) guilds of money changers (Cambio) and linen weavers (Lana).) for which Donatello then made his first bronze figure, the Saint Louis of Toulouse (1418–1422).

The main material used for the main object of a work is always mentioned first, then its treatment and secondary materials (as in the "Saint Louis of Toulouse with niche", first "bronze, fire-gilt", then silver, enamel and rock crystal for the decoration of the bishop's crosier, and finally the marble for the niche in which the figure originally stood, which was also created by Donatello).

=== Dimensions ===
In the 15th century there was a locally applicable ell (or arm length) which could range between around 50 and 75 cm. The size of a sculpture may have been specified as such in contracts or described in sources. In Donatello's case, the Florentine braccio (Italian "arm") of 58.3 cm was used for the most part.

If the measurements of a work are not given in the table as height × width × depth (in centimeters), at minimum the height of a figure or the diameter (d) of a tondo will be given, if that was all that could be found in the literature.

=== Dating ===
When it comes to dating the work, a compromise had to be made in that the initial dates are decisive here. This means that for documented objects it is often the date of the (first) written commission or the decision to do so. However, as is often the case (at this time) and not only for Donatello, the completion of a work or even the beginning lay sometimes years in the future. The specified time period does not therefore mean the actual time that Donatello spent on a work. Especially since, even at the other end (that is, after Donatello had completed a sculpture), a considerable amount of time could pass before it was (as is often the case) primed and colored and also gilded by painters. The installation on site did not have to happen immediately, so such information in documents does not necessarily indicate the time at which the sculpture was finished.

The priority of the starting date ignores the fact that during the period of often non-continuous work on a work, the understanding, the general knowledge of the classical model, with which Donatello continuously dealt, as well as the access to a specific task could change. This means that during the work process a stylistic change could take place that was not foreseeable at the beginning, or technical difficulties (or other circumstances) could arise that had to be solved and perhaps lead to a different result from what was originally planned.

Examples here include the early works, especially the marble David, the possible reworkings of which have been the subject of much speculation. Is the composition of the Saint Louis of Toulouse in several parts, rather than cast in one piece, as Ghiberti had done, due to Donatello's deficiencies in the knowledge of bronze casting, or was this based on a practical consideration regarding fire gilding or perhaps the complexity of the folds? The question of its open back (original or removed for Santa Croce?) will continue to concern art historians.

=== Locations ===
The locations always start with the city, then the building in or on which the work was or is located. Under original location there is also information that names the client or clients or allows conclusions to be drawn about them. An (early) relocation of a work is also noted (e.g., with both David figures). Today's location indicates in part the inventory number of the object ("Inv. xy") if it is part of a museum collection, if possible with a link to the institution's online catalog where – as with the Berlin collection – good images can be found, a detailed description and documentation, as well as a bibliography.

=== About the second table ===
Important here are the controversial works, which have always been close to the discussion about Donatello's œuvre, but which have been rejected from the catalogs of works that can be considered secure. Particularly worth mentioning here are the portrait bust of Niccolò da Uzzano, the Saint Peter at Orsanmichele and the Hildburgh Madonna and its derivatives.

Furthermore, the nature of the second table means that it cannot be complete. As far as casts and variants of mostly smaller to minute works are concerned, there may be a huge number scattered throughout museums and private collections that have received undocumented attributions based solely on stylistic similarities or technical details. This also applies to works based on Donatello's designs since the supposed designs no longer exist. The heraldic shields in particular, often with Donatello's trademark, the spiritelli, are probably all workshop products at best. Due to the lack of sources, there is no section for original location here, but one for the attribution appears as second column.

All of the works listed in the second table may be considered examples, with an obvious emphasis on works from the Skulpturensammlung in the Bode Museum, Berlin, for historical and practical reasons. On the one hand, the early Italian Renaissance and Donatello in particular have been the focus of collecting activities and research since the end of the 19th century, especially of Wilhelm von Bode, which was then essentially continued to this day. This is reflected in today's online catalog, wherein most of the works are excellently documented. This is also a reason for selecting the pieces from other museums, the Victoria and Albert Museum in London, which was similarly engaged as Berlin, the National Gallery of Art in Washington, the Detroit Institute of Arts, and of course the museums in Florence itself, Donatello's birthplace and the center of his professional life.

== Catalogue of works ==
Image	Subject/Name	Form	Material	Dimensions (in cm)	Dating	Original location	Current location
	Prophet	statue	marble	128	1406	Florence, Santa Maria del Fiore, Porta della Mandorla	Florence, Museo dell'Opera del Duomo
	Creation of Eve, Damnation of Eve and Adam, Expulsion from Eden, The Labour of Adam and Eve – function, attrib. and date arguable	reliefs (1 + 3), octagonal, probably for a hope chest (cassone)	terracotta, glass (1); lead-glazed, partly gilded (3)	34.5 × 34.5	1406–1408	unknown	Florence, Museo dell'Opera del Duomo ("9073"?, Uffizi cat. 00225654), other three in London, Victoria and Albert Museum (Inv. ? 3)
	Christ as the Man of Sorrows	relief	marble		1407–1408	Florence, Santa Maria del Fiore, Porta della Mandorla	Florence, Museo dell'Opera del Duomo. Copy on original site
	Crucifix	statue (demountable, with retractable arms)	wood, gesso primer, painted	170 × 166 × 35	1407–1408	Florence, Santa Croce, north transept	Florence, Santa Croce, Cappella Bardi di Vernio
	David (with the head of Goliath; marble David)	statue	marble, originally with cord of the sling	191.5 × 78.5 × 42	1408–1409, 1416	Florence, Santa Maria del Fiore, planned for north tribune; Palazzo della Signoria, Sala dei Gigli (1416)	Florence, Bargello (since 1781, Inv. Sc. 2)
	Saint John the Evangelist	statue in niche, sitting	marble	210	1408–1415	Florence, Santa Maria del Fiore, façade	Florence, Museo dell'Opera del Duomo
	Prophet Joshua	statue	terracotta, stucco, white-washed	c. 550	1409–1412	Florence, Santa Maria del Fiore, north tribune	deteriorated, not preserved
	Madonna and Child	statue	terracotta, gesso primer, painted		1410–1412	unknown	Empoli, Pontorme, San Martino
	Saint Mark	statue in niche	marble	236 × 74 (with base)	1411–1413	Florence, Orsanmichele, niche of the Arte dei Linaioli e Rigattieri (Guild of linen manufacturers and retail cloth dealers)	Florence, Orsanmichele, Museum. Copy at original site
	Madonna and Child – attribution and date arguable	statue, sitting	terracotta, originally primed and painted	73 × 45.3 × 36.5	c. 1414	unknown	London, Victoria and Albert Museum (Inv. 7573-1861)
	Madonna and Child – attribution and date arguable	statue, sitting	terracotta, gesso primer, painted	68.6 × 37.8 × 38.1; 38.1 kg	c. 1414	unknown	Detroit, Institute of Arts (Inv. 40.19)
	Madonna and Child (Huldschinsky Madonna) – attribution and date arguable	statue, half figure	terracotta, originally primed and painted	90 × 75 × 24	c. 1415	unknown	Berlin, Bode Museum (formerly Kaiser Friedrich Museum), Sculpture Collection and Museum of Byzantine Art (since 1892, Inv. 1940)
	Saint George and: base relief with Saint George Freeing the Princess; tympanum with God the Father	statue in niche with low reliefs	marble, probably at times with lance or sword and helmet (metal)	204 × 78 × 34 base relief: 39 × 120	c. 1415–1417	Florence, Orsanmichele, north side, niche of the Arte dei Corazzai e Spadai (Guild of the armourers and swordsmiths)	Florence, Bargello (in copied niche). Copy at original site
	Madonna and Child with Two Angels	tabernacle, relief	terracotta, originally primed and painted	96.5 × 67.5 × 13.5	c. 1415–1420	unknown	Prato, Museo di Palazzo Pretorio (since 1871, Inv. 1876)
	Prophets: Beardless Prophet; Bearded Prophet; (Profeta pensieroso)	statues in niches (first two of six)	marble	190 × 59 × 43, 193 × 64 × 44 (incl. plinth)	1416–1418 and 1418–1420	Florence, Santa Maria del Fiore, Campanile (all four on north side were moved to the east side in 1464)	Florence, Museo dell'Opera del Duomo (copies on east site)
	Lion with coat of arms of Florence (Marzocco)	statue on column	sandstone (macigno), marble, rosso di Maremma	135.5 × 38 × 60	1418–1420	Florence, Santa Maria Novella, stairs to papal chambers	Florence, Bargello
	Saint John the Baptist with Nanni di Bartolo, revised unfinished Joshua by Bernardo Ciuffagni	statue in niche (third of six)	marble	207 × 65 × 44	1420–1421	Florence, Santa Maria del Fiore, Campanile	Florence, Museo dell'Opera del Duomo (copy on original site)
	Saint Louis of Toulouse with niche perhaps with Michelozzo di Bartolommeo	statue and architecture of aedicula	bronze, fire-gilded (ormolu), silver, enamel, rock crystal and marble	285 × 101 × 78	c. 1418–1422	Florence, Orsanmichele, east side, niche of the Parte Guelfa, moved c. 1440s–1450s to niche above portal of Santa Croce; since 1483 Verrocchio's Doubting Thomas has occupied the original niche	Florence, Museo dell'Opera di Santa Croce
	Madonna and Child (Madonna of the Apple) – attribution and date arguable	relief	terracotta, gesso primer, painted	89 × 64 × 28	c. 1420–1423	unknown	Florence, Museo Civici Fiorentini – Museo Stefano Bardini (Inv. MCF-MB 1922-682)
	Flagellation of Christ – function, attribution and date arguable	relief, low	marble	46.5 × 57.5 × 5	c. 1420–1425	unknown	Moscow, Pushkin Museum, 1893–1945 in Berlin, Kaiser Friedrich Museum (henceforth solely as plaster cast)
	Abraham and Isaac with Nanni di Bartolo	statue in niche (fourth of six)	marble	188 × 56 × 45	1421	Florence, Santa Maria del Fiore, Campanile	Florence, Museo dell'Opera del Duomo (copy on east side of Campanile)
	Tomb of Antipope John XXIII: tomb effigy. base, statues of virtues, sarcophagus, lunette with Madonna and Child, baldachin with Michelozzo and Pagno di Lapo Portigiani	Tomb effigy, architecture, relief	marble, partly painted and gilded, bronze, fire-gilded	213 (length of effigy)	c. 1421–1427	Florence, Baptistery	Florence, Baptistery
	Prophet and Sibyl	relief, profile busts	marble	64, each	1422	Florence, Santa Maria del Fiore, Porta della Mandorla	Florence, Santa Maria del Fiore, Porta della Mandorla
	Madonna and Child (Pazzi Madonna)	relief, low	marble	74.5 × 73 × 6.5	c. 1422	unknown; thought to have been owned by the Pazzi family	Berlin, Bode Museum (since 1886, Inv. 51)
	Reliquary Bust of Saint Rossore (= Saint Luxorius)	bust, reliquary with lit and halo (lost)	bronze, fire-gilded	55 × 58 × 42	c. 1422–1425	Florence, Ognissanti, since 1591 in Pisa, Santo Stefano dei Cavalieri	Pisa, Museo nazionale di San Matteo (since 1977)
	Prophet Jeremiah	statue in niche (fifth of six)	marble	191 × 45 × 45	c. 1423	Florence, Santa Maria del Fiore, west side of Campanile	Florence, Museo dell'Opera del Duomo (copy on original site)
	Saint John the Baptist	statue	bronze, patinated	90.5 × 36.5 × 30	1423–24	Orvieto, Cattedrale di Santa Maria Assunta, baptismal font – uncertain	Moscow, Pushkin Museum, 1878 from Palazzo Strozzi until 1945 in Berlin, Kaiser Friedrich Museum (henceforth solely as plaster cast)
	Feast of Herod	relief (one on the hexagonal parapet)	bronze, fire-gilded	60 × 61	1423–1427	Siena, Baptistery, baptismal font	Siena, Baptistery
	Madonna and Child with Four Angels (Madonna of the Clouds)	relief	marble	34 × 32.1 × 2.8	c. 1425–1430	Florence, Palazzo vecchio di Medici, guardaroba of Cosimo (died 1464); afterwards in possession of Piero del Pugliese	Boston, Museum of Fine Arts (Inv. 17.1470)
	Prophet Habakkuk (Zuccone)	statue in niche (last of six)	marble	195 × 54 × 38	1426 – c. 1427 and 1435–1436	Florence, Santa Maria del Fiore, Campanile	Florence, Museo dell'Opera del Duomo (copy on west side of the Campanile)
	Tomb of Cardinal Rainaldo Brancacci: Annunciation relief all other design and execution by Michelozzo (and workshop)	relief, low; tomb monument with statues and reliefs, partly painted and gilded	marble	74 × 78 (relief)	1426–1428	Naples, Sant'Angelo a Nilo	Naples, Sant'Angelo a Nilo
	Faith and Hope	statuettes, two (of six) corner figures	bronze, fire-gilded	52, each	1427–1429	Siena, Baptistery, baptismal font	Siena, Baptistery
	Ascension with Christ Giving the Keys to Saint Peter	relief, low	marble	41 × 115	1428–1430	Florence; 1492 owned by Lorenzo de' Medici, then by the Salviati until after 1677	London, Victoria and Albert Museum (Inv. 7629-1861)
	Blood of the Redeemer	relief	marble	39.8 × 67	1429–1430	Siena (province), Torrita di Siena, Oratorio della Madonna delle Nevi	Siena (province), Torrita di Siena, Chiesa delle Sante Flora e Lucilla
	Spiritelli, making music with trumpet resp. tambourine	statuettes	bronze, fire-gilded	40 × 20 × 15.8; 36.2 × 14.7 × 16.2	1429	Siena, Baptistery, baptismal font	Siena, Baptistery, baptismal font (with trumpet), Berlin, Bode Museum (Inv. 2653); a third perhaps in Florence, Bargello (Inv. )
links	Dovizia (on the Colonna dell'Abbondanza)	statue on column	sandstone (macigno)		1431	Florence, Mercato (vecchio), now Piazza della Repubblica	deteriorated and destroyed in a fall in 1721 (replaced with a version by Giovanni Battista Foggini, itself now replaced by a copy)
	Tomb slab for the papal secretary Giovanni Crivelli	relief, low	marble	235 × 88	1432	Rome, Santa Maria in Ara Coeli	Rome, Santa Maria in Ara Coeli
	Tabernacle (for the Eucharist)	relief	marble	225 × 120	1432	Rome, Apostolic Palace, Capella Parva	Rome (Vatican), St. Peter's Basilica
	Altar piece (Cavalcanti Annunciation)	relief in tabernacle, group of six statuettes	sandstone (macigno), painted white/gray with gilding terracotta (spiritelli)	419	c. 1433–1435	Florence, Santa Croce, for the Cavalcanti family chapel	Florence, Santa Croce
	Pulpit for organ or singers, Cantoria	reliefs of triforium on corbels and columns	marble, mosaic, bronze	348 × 570	1433–1439	Florence, Santa Maria del Fiore	Florence, Museo dell'Opera del Duomo
	Coronation of the Virgin (design)	leadlight, oculus	cartoon	c. 380	1434–1437	Florence, Santa Maria del Fiore, eastern arch of the crossing (above the choir)	Florence, Santa Maria del Fiore
	Pulpit of the Holy Girdle: parapet with dancing spiritelli between pairs of pilasters; in part by workshop: capital; by Michelozzo: Architecture; planned with Michelozzo, executed by workshop (Pagno di Lapo Portigiani) and specialists on the spot	reliefs (seven)	marble, mosaic (glass casting, glazed ceramic, formerly gilded tesserae) for parapet bronze, fire-gilded (capital)	77 × 86 × 12 (each relief); 94.5 × 143.5 × 50 (capital)	1434–1438 (parapet, after new contract) commission of 1428, cast of capital at the end of 1433	Prato, Cathedral (then Pieve di Santo Stefano), southwest corner of façade	Prato, Cathedral and Cathedral Museum (1976, Inv. AGJ2748, [...] and AGJ1829); copies on original site
	Old Sacristy: eight tondi with four scenes of the life of Saint John and the four Evangelists sitting at their desks; two lunettes with Saints Stephen and Lawrence (l), and Cosmas and Damian (r); two doors with twenty pairs of arguing martyrs (l) and apostles (r), five on each leaf, architectural frames and; decoration on supports; architecture designed by Filippo Brunelleschi – no documents; first source is Filarete, Trattato, 1460–1464	reliefs, architectural frames	bronze (doors), painted stucco (tondi and lunettes), sandstone (macigno)	c. 215 d (tondi without molding) c. 215 × 180 (lunettes without frame); 235 × 109 (each door with ten reliefs of 36.5 × 33.5 l, 34.5 r, both 35 at bottom)	1434–1443	Florence, San Lorenzo	Florence, San Lorenzo
	Feast of Herod	relief, low	marble	50 × 71.3 × 5	c. 1435	unknown	Lille, Palais des Beaux-Arts (Inv. Pl 1912)
	Madonna and Child (Goretti Miniati Madonna)	relief	marble	62.6 × 43.5 × 5	c. 1435	unknown	Florence, Bargello (Inv. Sc 470)
	Dead Christ Tended by Angels (Imago Pietatis) – function, attribution and date arguable	relief, low	marble	80.5 × 114.3 × 6	c. 1435	unknown	London, Victoria and Albert Museum (Inv. 7577-1861)
	David with Sword and Severed Head of Goliath (bronze David)	statue on column (lost or as remains, original height over 2 m)	bronze, partly fire-gilded marble (attributed column remains)	159	1435–1440	Florence, Casa Vecchia de' Medici, perhaps at first in the old Medici palace; after 1457 in the court of Palazzo Medici; 1495 in the court of Palazzo della Signoria	Florence, Bargello
	Spiritello (Amor-Attis)	statue	bronze, partly fire-gilded	103 × 55 × 45	c. 1435–1440	Florence	Florence, Bargello (since 1778, Inv. Br. 448)
	Spiritelli candle-holders (two)	statuettes, candelabra	bronze, gilding	58.5 × 42 × 28; 65 × 32.5 × 22	c. 1436–1438	Florence, Santa Maria del Fiore, for organ pulpit by Luca della Robbia	Paris, Institut de France, Musée Jacquemart-André (Inv. MJAP-S 1773-1 and 2)
	Saint John the Baptist	statue	wood, gesso primer/stucco, painted and gilded		1438	Venice, Santa Maria Gloriosa dei Frari	Venice, Santa Maria Gloriosa dei Frari
	Saint Lawrence – attribution and date arguable	half figure	terracotta, formerly painted	74.5 × 62	c. 1440		private ownership
	Madonna and Child (Dudley Madonna)	relief, low	marble	27.2 × 16.5 × 2	c. 1440	unknown	London, Victoria and Albert Museum (Inv. A.84-1927)
	Madonna and Child (Piot Madonna)	relief	terracotta, wax, glass, formerly gilded	74 × 75 × 7	c. 1440	unknown	Paris, Louvre (since 1890, Inv. RF 3967)
	Madonna and Child (Madonna of the Cherubs)	relief with intarsia	terracotta, gesso primer/stucco, painted and gilded	99.6 × 69.5 20	c. 1440–1445	unknown	Berlin, Bode Museum (since 1888, Inv. 54)
	Madonna and Child (Madonna dell'Umiltà Crowned by Two Angels)	relief tondo, gilded (in tabernacle by Desiderio da Settignano or Andrea Verrocchio)	bronze, fire-gilded	27 d (87 × 51 × 12)	c. 1440–1445 (tabernacle shortly after)	unknown	Vienna, Kunsthistorisches Museum, Kunstkammer (Inv. KK 7462)
	Mary Magdalene (Penitent Magdalene)	statue	wood, gesso primer/stucco, painted and gilded	188	1440–1442	Florence, Baptistery	Florence, Museo dell'Opera del Duomo
	Crucifix	statue on cross	wood, gesso primer/stucco, painted	192 × 185	1440–1445	Padua, Santa Maria dei Servi	Padua, Santa Maria dei Servi
	Saint John the Baptist (San Giovannino Martelli) – function, attribution and date arguable	statue, in the round, with halo and rod with cross	marble, gilded bronze	159.5 (165) × 46.5 × 36	c. 1442	Florence, Casa Martelli	Florence, Bargello (1913 from the Martelli family, Inv. Sc. 435)
	Crucifix	statue on cross	bronze	176 × 170 × 41	1443/44–1448/49	Padua, Basilica di Sant'Antonio, rood screen	Padua, Museo Antoniano
	Madonna and Child	relief, low	terracotta, gesso primer/stucco, painted	102 × 74 × 12, 112 kg	c. 1445–1455	Val d'Elsa, Vigliano, San Lorenzo chapel	Paris, Louvre (1881, Inv. RF 353)
	High altar: Madonna and Child (Virgin and Child Enthroned) with relief of the Fall of Man on back of throne; six standing figures of Saints Francis, Louis of Toulouse, Prosdocimus, Anthony, Daniel and Justina; four reliefs with miracles of Saint Anthony; twelve reliefs with angels making music; Entombment of Christ	statues (7) and 22 reliefs	bronze, patinated, partly fire-gilded (statues and reliefs) limestone (Entombment), white and colored marble (altar)	123–164 (statues) c. 57 × 123 or 57 (each relief)	1446–1449	Padua, Basilica of Saint Anthony	Padua, Basilica of Saint Anthony (19th-century reconstruction)
	Gattamelata Monument (Condottiere Erasmo da Narni)	Equestrian statue on pedestal with two reliefs and inscription	bronze, patinated marble (reliefs and plinth) sandstone (pedestal)		c. 1446–1453	Padua, Piazza Sant'Antonio	Padua, Piazza Sant'Antonio
	Tomb slap of Giovanni Pecci (Bishop of Grosseto, died 1427)	relief, low	bronze, enamel inlays with glass, mostly lost	249.5 × 106.8 × 3	1448–1450	Siena, Cathedral, crossing, moved to Saint Ansanus chapel (under Pecci patronage) in the 16th century	Siena, Cathedral, Saint Ansanus chapel
	Flagellation of Christ and Crucifixion, predella frieze with spiritelli (Forzori Altar); bozzetto	relief, low, damaged	terracotta	53.5 × 27.1 × 4.5 (Flagellation); 54.7 × 30.5 × 5 (Crucifixion); 11.2 × 48.5 × 2.3 (predella)	c. 1450	Florence, owned by Forzori family	London, Victoria and Albert Museum (Inv. 7619 1-3-1861)
	Madonna and Child	relief, low	terracotta, gesso, painted	70 × 55 × 2	c. 1450	unknown	Paris, Louvre (1986, Inv. RF 744)
	Calvary (Camondo Calvary) – function, attribution and date arguable	relief, low	bronze, formerly partly gilded	42.8 × 28.7 × 4.5	1450–1452	unknown (private commission)	Paris, Louvre (1897, Inv. OA 6477)
	Madonna and Child with Four Angels (Chellini Madonna)	relief tondo, low, reverse shows negative of relief usable to cast copies	bronze, gilded	28.5 d, 2.7, 4.2 kg	1450–1455	Florence; gift of Donatello to his doctor Giovanni Chellini	London, Victoria and Albert Museum (Inv. A.I-1976)
	Judith and Holofernes	sculptural group on triangular pedestal with three reliefs	bronze	236	1453–1457	Florence, Palazzo Medici, garden; after 1494 in the Loggia dei Lanzi on the Piazza della Signoria	Florence, Palazzo Vecchio
	Saint John the Baptist	statue	bronze	185	c. 1455	Siena, Cathedral	Siena, Cathedral
	Bearded Head (Prophet?) – function, attribution and date arguable	bust	bronze	37 × 23 × 27	c. 1455	Florence	Florence, Bargello (Inv. Br. 101)
	Madonna and Child (Seggiolino Madonna or Madonna of the Little Chair)	relief	terracotta, gilded	74.3 × 55.9	c. 1455		London, Victoria and Albert Museum (Inv. 57:1&2-1867)
	Calvary	relief, low	bronze, partly gilded, silver, gilded copper	93 × 70 × 3.5	1455–1465	Florence, private commission; from the 16th century owned by the Medici	Florence, Bargello (Inv. Br. 443)
	Horse's Head (Protome Carafa) – function, attribution and date arguable	protome, probably part of an equestrian statue not executed	bronze	187 × 185 × 80	1456	Naples, Castel Nuovo, triumphal arch (planned, commission by Alfonso of Aragon, died 1458)	Naples, Museo Archeologico Nazionale (Inv. 4887), from the Palazzo Carafa
	Madonna and Child (Madonna del Perdono)	relief	marble, white and colored	91 × 88.2	c. 1458	Siena, Cathedral, Vergine delle Grazie chapel	Siena, Museo dell'Opera del'Duomo
	Lamentation over the Dead Christ; probably a bozzetto	relief, chasing	bronze	32.1 × 41.7 × 6.3	1458–1460	Siena; probably planned for the bronze doors of the Cathedral	London, Victoria and Albert Museum (Inv. 8552-1863)
	Passion and Resurrection scenes completion by Bartolomeo Bellano, Bertoldo di Giovanni and others – original function unclear	reliefs (), mounted into a free-standing chancel in the 16th century	bronze	123 × 292	1461–1466	Florence, San Lorenzo	Florence, San Lorenzo

== Arguable attributions, casts, variants and works after models by Donatello ==
Image	Attribution	Subject/Name	Form	Material	Dimensions (in cm)	Year	Location
	Donatello attributed	Madonna and Child	relief	terracotta, gesso primer/stucco, painted, wooden back	102.5 × 62.2 × 28.3	c. 1410–1415	Washington, National Gallery of Art, Samuel L. Kress Collection (Inv. 1943.4.93)
	Nanni di Bartolo	Madonna and Child	statue	terracotta, painted	48 × 35 × 11.5	c. 1420–1425	Berlin, Bode Museum (since 1913, Inv. M 7174)
	Donatello workshop	Madonna and Child with Four Angels (Hildburgh Madonna) – function, attribution and date arguable	relief, low	marble	41.5 × 32.5 × 3.4	c. 1420–1430	London, Victoria and Albert Museum (Inv. A.98-1956)
	after Hildburgh Madonna attributed to Donatello	Madonna and Child, Two Angels, Saint Bartholomew and a Crowned Saint	tabernacle, relief	stucco, gilded and painted	40.6 × 30.5 (relief); 76.2 × 38.1 × 7.5	c. 1420–1430	London, Victoria and Albert Museum (Inv. 93-1882)
	Donatello attributed	Nativity of Christ (Ford Nativity)	relief	terracotta, formerly painted and gilded	47 × 35.6 × 8.3 (incl. frame: 82.6 × 48.3 × 8.3)	c. 1420–1430	Detroit, Institute of Arts (Inv. F76.92)
	Donatello attributed	Madonna and Child (Mellon Madonna)	statue	terracotta, painted and gilded	120.8 × 47.2 × 33.5	c. 1422	Washington, National Gallery of Art, A. Mellon Collection (Inv. 1937.I.112)
	Donatello attributed	The Baptism of Christ	relief, low	marble	63.5 × 40.5	after 1425	Arezzo Cathedral
	after Donatello	Madonna and Child in a niche	relief, low	bronze, silvered	20.5 × 15.5 × 1, 2.54 kg	c. 1426–1430 (prototype)	Berlin, Bode Museum (Inv. 3044)
	after Donatello	Madonna and Child in a niche	relief, low	bronze, gilded	20.4 × 15.3 × 8	c. 1426–1430 (prototype)	Washington, National Gallery of Art, Samuel L. Kress Collection (Inv. 1957.14.131)
	after Donatello	Madonna and Child (Maria lactans)	relief, low	lead	11.3 × 9.3	c. 1430	Berlin, Bode Museum (Inv. 1028)
	unknown, perhaps Michelozzo di Bartolomeo	Madonna and Child before a niche	relief, low, plaquette	Copper alloy	9.8 × 7.8	c. 1430	London, Wallace Collection (Inv. S299)
	after Donatello	Spiritelli with Escutcheon	relief, low	sandstone (pietra serena?), probably originally painted	59.5 × 61 × 5	c. 1432	Berlin, Bode Museum (since 1916, Inv. 7210)
	Paolo Schiavo, painted and framed relief after model by Donatello	Madonna and Child Between Angels, God the Father, Eve and a Crowned Prophet	tabernacle, relief	stucco (relief) in wooden framing, painted and gilded	12.1 × 9.5 (relief); 36.5 × 20.2 × 5.2	c. 1435	London, Victoria and Albert Museum (Inv. A.45-1926)
	perhaps Donatello workshop	Spiritello with Fish	statuette, probably from a font at a wall	bronze	40.5 × 40.4 × 11, 7 kg	1435–1440	London, Victoria and Albert Museum (Inv. 475-1864)
	after Donatello	Madonna and Child (Pugliese Dudley Madonna)	relief, low	stucco, painted	31.5 × 21	c. 1440 (prototype)	Berlin, Bode Museum (Inv. 2627)
	after Donatello	Virgin and Child with Seven Angels (with coat of arms of the Pazzi family)	relief, low, plaquette	bronze	18 × 17.5 × 2, 1,47 kg	1440–1450	Berlin, Bode Museum (2847)
	Desiderio da Settignano, alt. Donatello attributed	Bust of Niccolò da Uzzano	portrait bust	terracotta, painted	46 h	1440–1455	Florence, Bargello
	perhaps Donatello workshop	Madonna and Child (Madonna dei Cordai)	relief	stucco, leather, glass and wax on wood, painted, gilded and silvered	93 × 78	1440–1460	Florence, Museo Bardini
	after Donatello	Madonna and Child	relief, low	stucco, painted	99 × 66.6 × 11.5	c. 1450 (prototype)	Berlin, Bode Museum (Inv. 2634)
	Donatello workshop	Madonna and Child (copy of Pazzi Madonna)	relief in tabernacle	terracotta, painted and gilded	70 × 55 × 2 (relief only)	c. 1450	Paris, Louvre (Inv. RF 744)
	Donatello attributed	Playing Cherubs (Spiritelli)	relief	bronze	4.8 × 8.4 × 0.5	1450s (mid-15th century)	Detroit, Institute of Arts (Inv. F70.32)
	Donatello attributed	Coat of arms of the Martelli Family	relief	sandstone (macigno), primer, painted	109.2	1450s (mid-15th century)	Detroit Institute of Arts (1925, Inv. 25.156)
	Donatello attributed or the model executed under his direction by the workshop of Desiderio and Geri da Settignano	Coat of arms of the Martelli family	relief	sandstone (pietra serena), partly painted and gilded		c. 1455	Florence, Bargello (Inv. 532 S)
	Desiderio da Settignano	Coat of arms of the Boni family	relief	sandstone (pietra serena)	215.9 × 74.3	c. 1456–1458	Detroit, Institute of Arts (Gift of Mr. and Mrs. Edsel B. Ford, Inv. 41.124)
	after Donatello	Crucifixion	relief, low	stucco on poplar with remnants of gilding, original wooden frame	36.5 × 26.6 × 4, frame: 53.5 × 45 × 7.5	1460–1466	Berlin, Bode Museum (since 1883, Inv. 53)
	Cast after a lost model attributed to Donatello	David with the Severed Head of Goliath; probably a bozzetto	statuette (on later marble base)	bronze (after a wax model by Donatello c. 1455)	37 × 10.5 × 10.5, 8.32 kg	1460–1470 (cast)	Berlin, Bode Museum (since 1896, Inv. 2262)
	Donatello attributed	Madonna and Child with Five Angels; probably a bozzetto	relief	terracotta, originally painted	21.5 × 15.5 × 4.2	c. 1465	Berlin, Bode Museum (Inv. M 88)

== Bibliography ==
- Horst W. Janson (1957). The Sculpture of Donatello (2 Vol.). Princeton: Princeton University Press. Archive URL of the 1963 edition in one volume with fewer images.
- John Pope-Hennessy (1996) [1958]. An Introduction to Italian Sculpture, Vol. 2: Italian Renaissance Sculpture (4., revised ed.). London: Phaidon.
- Francesco Caglioti with Laura Cavazzini, Aldo Galli and Neville Rowley (2022). Donatello. The Renaissance. Venice: Marsilio Arte. ISBN 979-12-5463-006-8.
- Neville Rowley with Francesco Caglioti, Laura Cavazzini and Aldo Galli (2022). Donatello. Erfinder der Renaissance. Leipzig: E. A. Seemann. ISBN 978-3-86502-482-4.
