= Huldschinsky Madonna =

Huldschinsky Madonna may refer to:

- Huldschinsky Madonna (painting), a tempera-and-gold-on-panel painting by Carlo Crivelli
- Huldschinsky Madonna (sculpture), a terracotta sculpture attributed to Donatello
