= Amor-Attis =

Sculpture by Donatello

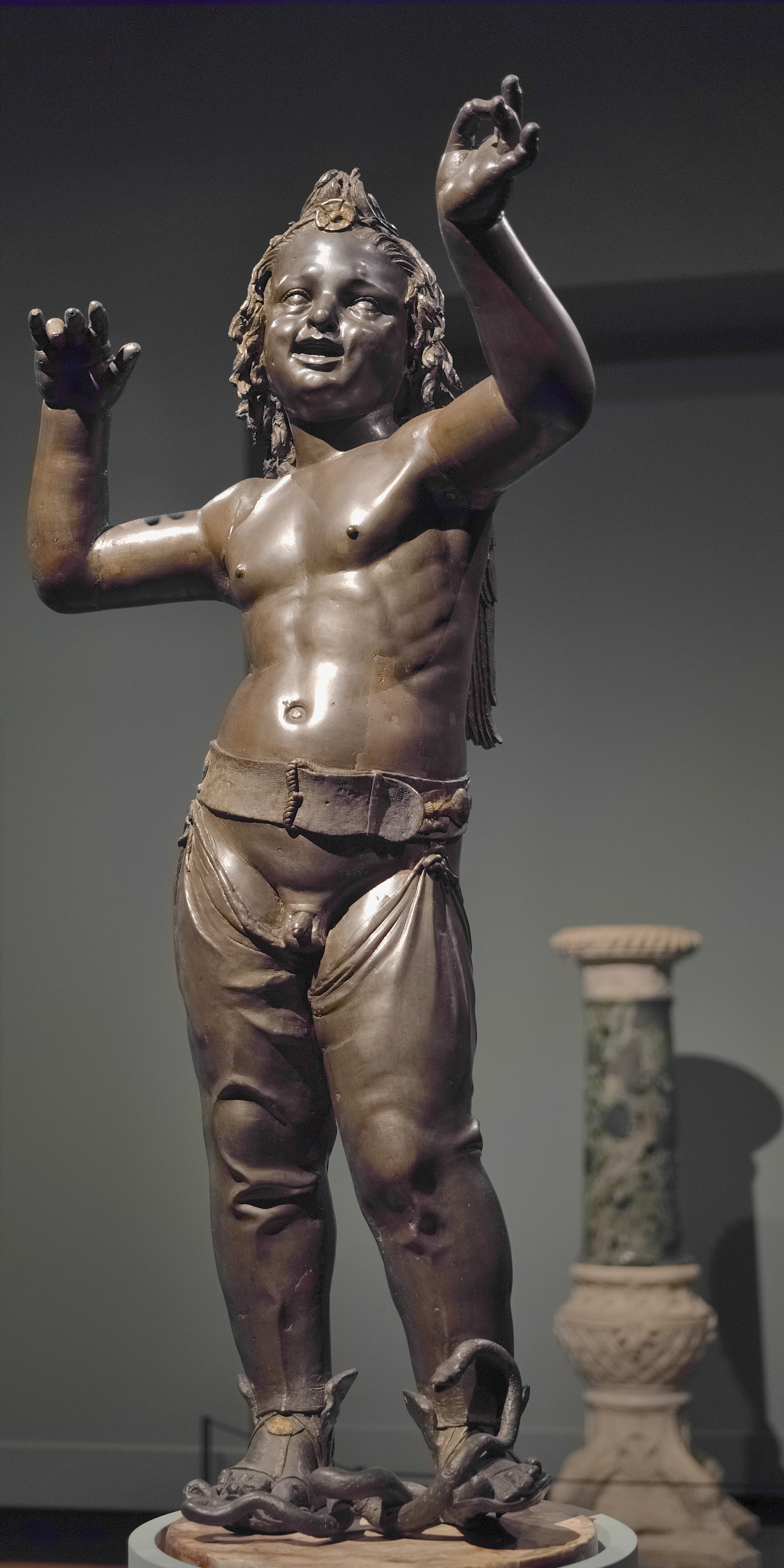
Amor-Attis

Amor-Attis (Cupid-Attis, or Atys-Amor and other variations) is a bronze sculpture by Donatello of c. 1440–1443. It is 104 cm high and has traces of its original gilding, and is now in the Museo del Bargello in Florence.

With his most famous work, the bronze David (also in the Bargello), it is the main sculpture of his to carry a clear erotic charge, probably humorous. The figure has a variety of attributes that relate to classical iconography, but too many to allow a clear identification.

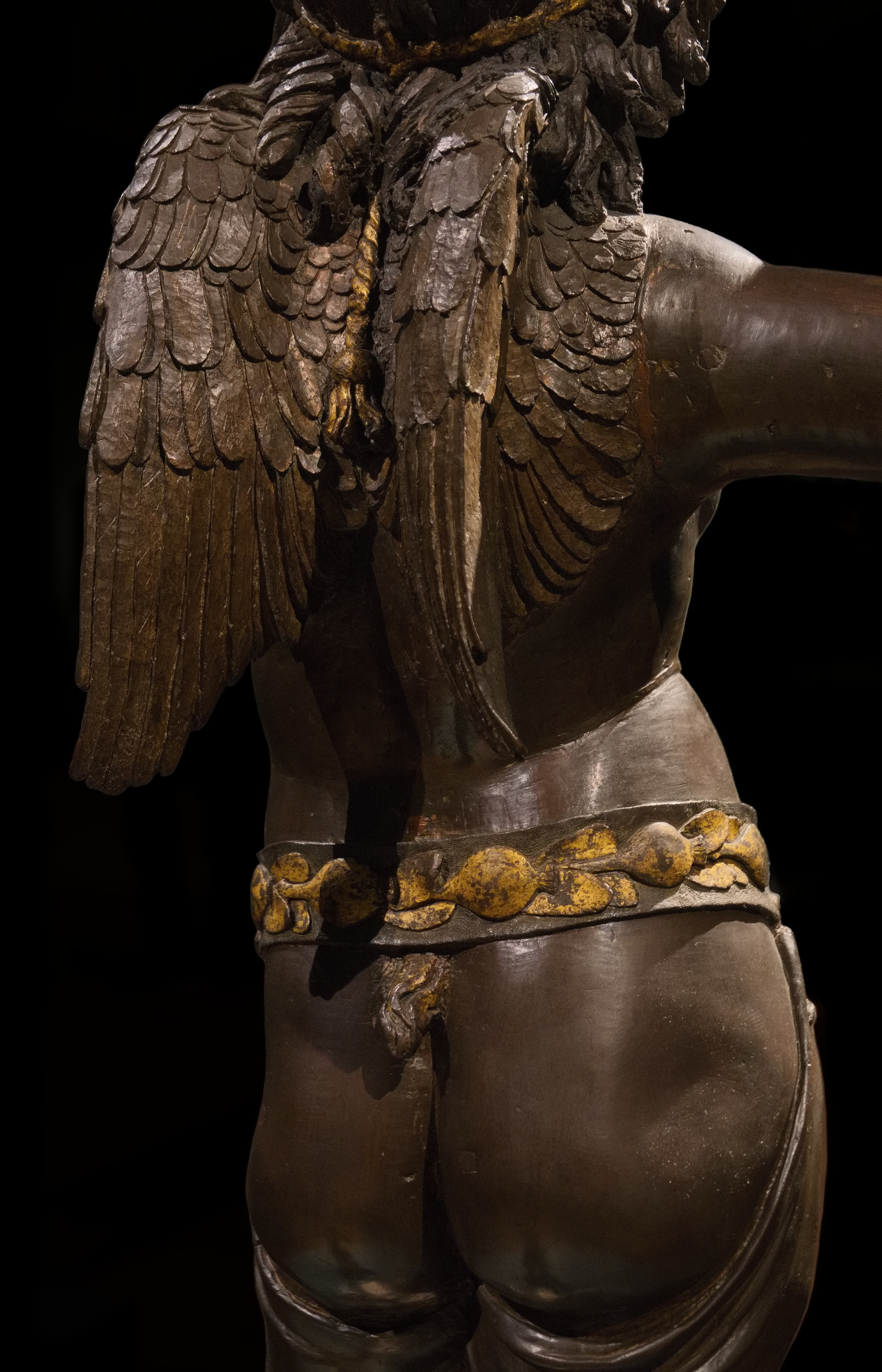
Rear view

== Who? ==
The figure's wings are those of a cupid (a putto or Eros), while the leggings uncovering the buttocks and pubis are those of Attis. Other proposals for its identity are Perseus, Priapus, Mercury (according to Muntz), Harpocrates, a faun (according to Venturi), Cupid-Hercules, Mithras, Eros-Patheos, a personification of drunkenness, a child genius or a half-demon half-angel child spirit. Scalini proposed it showed "Conjugal Love Triumphing over Earth and Water", linking it to a marble base in the Victoria and Albert Museum and theorising they were both originally on a fountain built for the wedding festivities of Bernardo Rucellai and Nannina de' Medici in 1466. The decisive key would have been the object held in the figure's hand, lost since 1677. Edward Wind titled it "Multi-Formed Cupid" and stated "he has the face and wings of the classical Eros, he has Pan's tail, Attis's trousers, Hypnos's belt and Mercury's sandals".

== History ==
No documents likely existed to give the work's original location or commissioner, but it is probably the work referred to by Vasari as a Mercury exactly attributed to Donatello, described by him as "one braccia (arm, c. 60 cm) and a half tall, sculpted in the round and dressed in a certain bizarre way" and stated to be in Agnolo Doni's house.

The poppy capsules on the belt symbolise sleep as well as being the heraldic symbol of the Bartolini Salimbeni family, though it has not yet been proven that that family definitely commissioned the statue. It was definitely not paid for by Doni, since his family's fortunes were insufficient to commission such a fine bronze work, only rising in the 16th century. Its very particular iconography has not yet been fully explained but may suggest a very specific private commission, perhaps linked to cultured humanist circles in Florence.

In 1677 Cinelli wrote that he believed the work was a classical antiquity due to its pagan attributes and unbridled vital joy. It was also listed in a 17th-century inventory of works at palazzo Doni on corso dei Tintori, locating it over a fireplace in a salotto (living room) and calling it a Lucifer. Giovanni Battista Doni owned it in the 17th century and sought opinions on its iconography from scholars and Roman antiquarians such as Luca Holstenio and Giovan Pietro Bellori, who were the first to name it Attis.

In the 18th century Pietro Bono Doni decided to sell the work to the Gallerie fiorentine for 600 scudi, with Giuseppe Pelli Bencivenni taking care of the negotiations. On 25 June 1778 it was exhibited for the first time at the Uffizi as Ancient Idol. Its attribution, dating and meaning were all then the subject of some debate. At that time Pelli Bencivenni had a drawing made by Francesco Marchissi and sent copies to major scholars of the era. Luigi Lanzi, then in Rome, showed it to Ennio Quirino Visconti and Scipione Maffei among others, who initially identified it as an ancient work, possibly showing Bacchus as a child. However, they then changed their mind and theorised that it was a modern work, finally accepting the attribution by Vasari in 1782.

Later art historians have almost unanimously accepted this attribution to Donatello, dating it to the time between his trip to Rome in 1433 and his departure for Padua in 1443, when he created works showing a deep knowledge of Greek and Roman antiquity, such as his famous David. In his essay Ritorno Amore, Francesco Caglioti criticised the dating to 1436–1438, comparing the work to the two putti candle-holders now in the Musée Jacquemart-André. A 2001–2005 restoration revealed the original patina (with the wings a different colour to the body) and major traces of the original gilding.

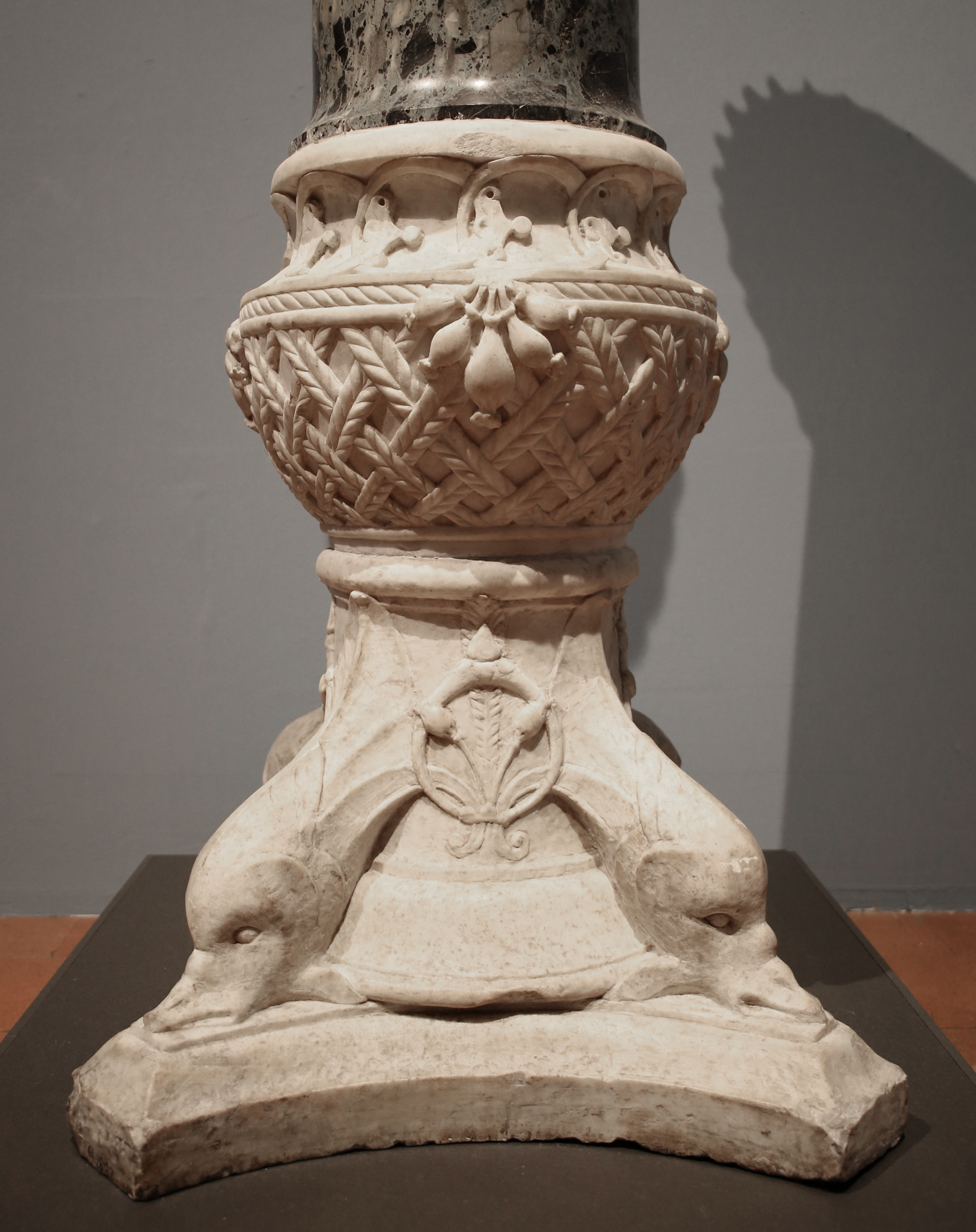
Base of the probable column for the statue, with the insignia of the Bartolini Salimbeni family, c. 1465–70, V&A Museum, London

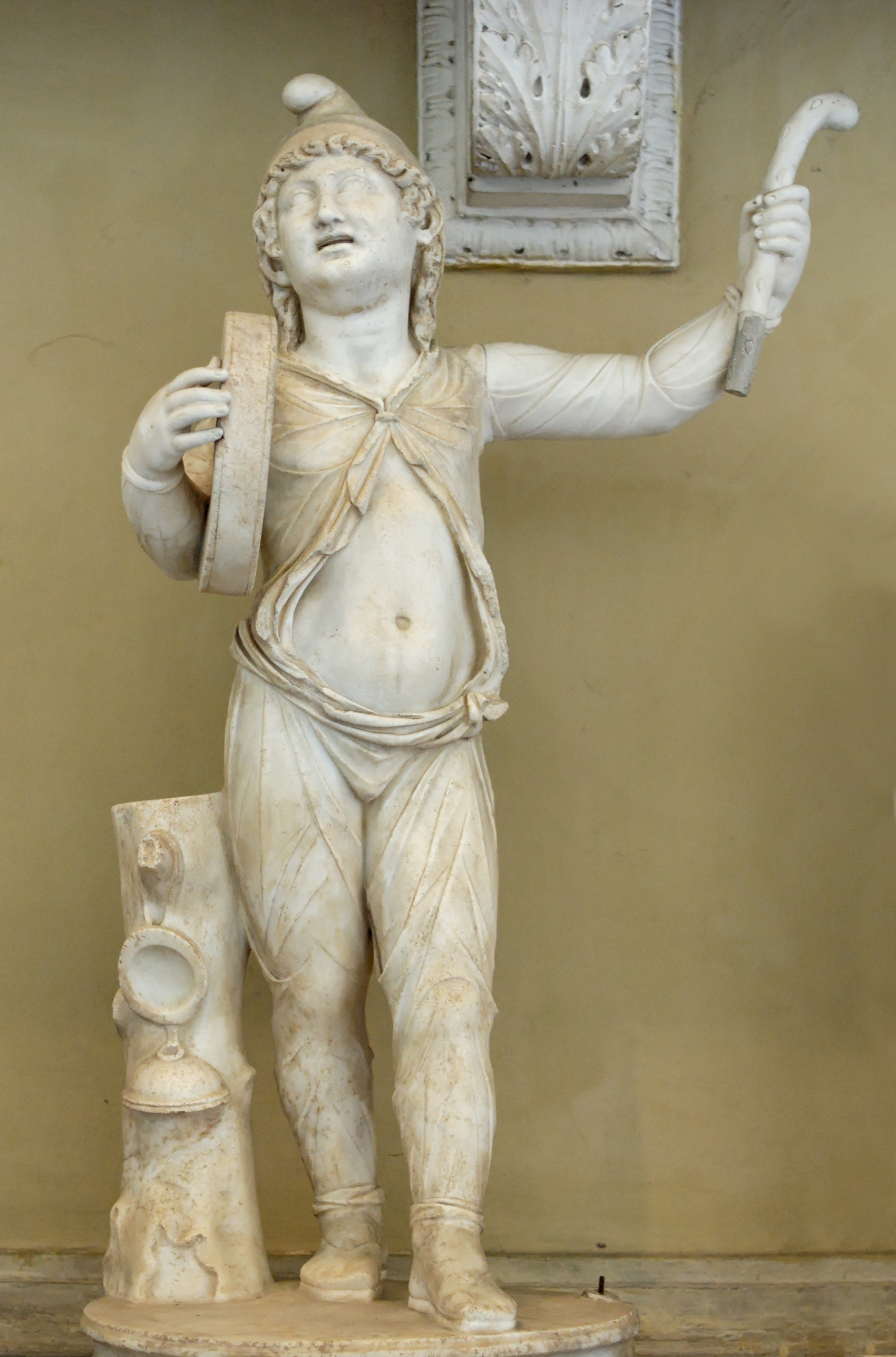
The Attys Chiaramonte, ancient statue of Attis in the Musei Vaticani
