= Madonna and Child with Four Cherubs =

Sculpture by Donatello

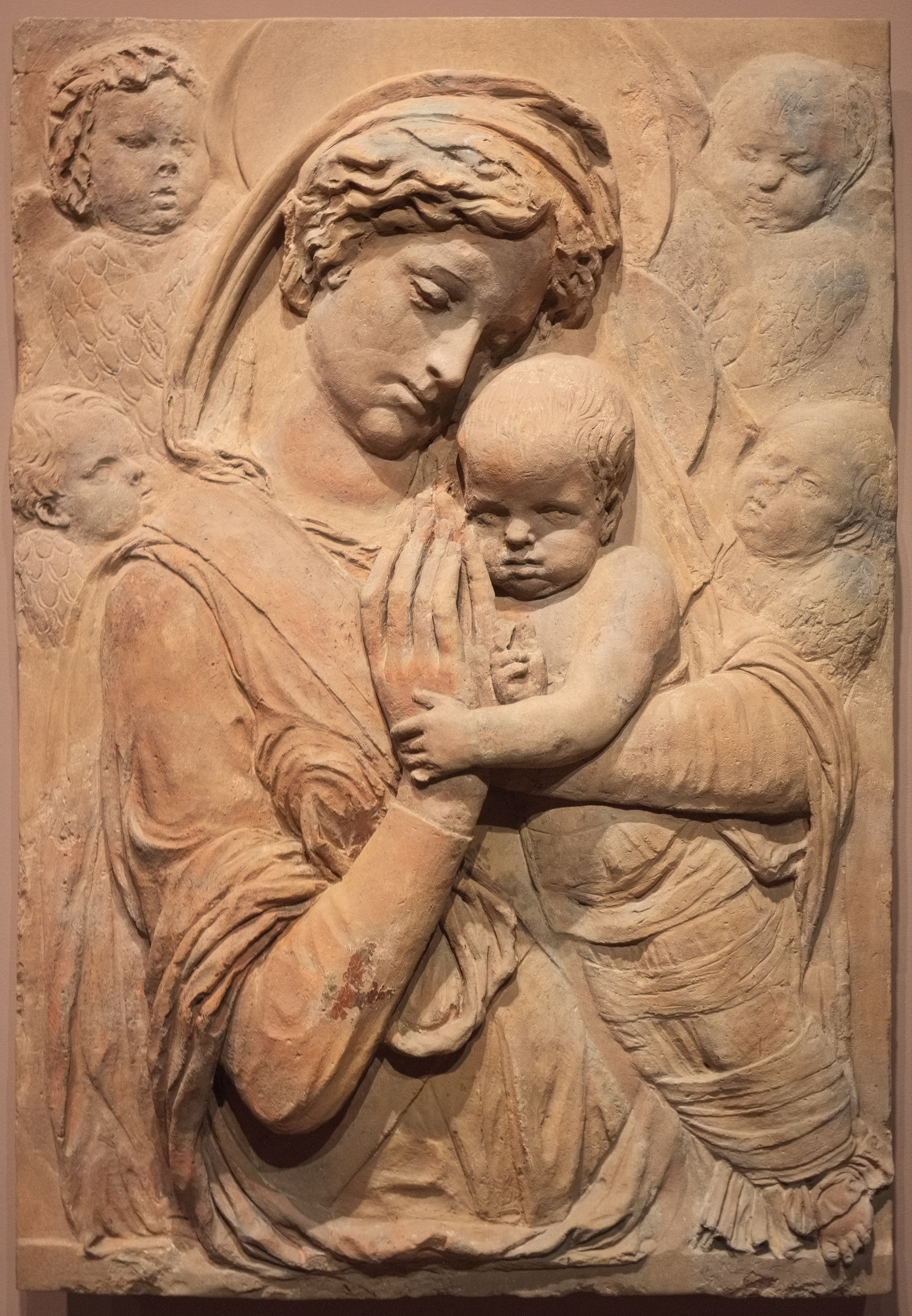

Madonna and Child with Four Cherubs is a formerly painted terracotta sculpture attributed to Donatello from around 1440–1450, now in the sculpture collection of the Staatliche Museen zu Berlin displayed in the Bode-Museum. The relief was acquired by the collection's first director Wilhelm von Bode in 1888 from Florentine art dealer Stefano Bardini.

== Description ==
Both figures of Mary and her child are unstable, the Jesus Child stands on a ledge, with his half-swathed body protruding out of the picture plane, leaning against its mother and blesses the beholder, while Mary slightly gives in, embraces him with her left arm, and folds her hands for praying. Her head leans lovingly towards his with an air of intimacy that recalls his Pazzi Madonna, a work entirely in schiacciato, and in Berlin as well. The cherubs or spiritelli, who always replace the former angels in Donatello's work, surround the mother and child all in a different pose. They are executed in his original technique, the relievo schiacciato, that enrich the picture and may delight the viewer, without taking center stage.

The attributuion to Donatello was seldomly doubted, challenged only by Maud Cruttwell in 1911, and his main biographer, Horst W. Janson (of all people), not even mentioned it in his seminal 1957 monograph.

== History and condition ==
Like other works of the Berlin collection, toward the end of the Second World War the Madonna was sheltered in the flak tower in Friedrichshain, but badly damaged by fire in 1945, with breaks in several places. It also lost its traces of polychromy and gilding almost completely, for which it was "once highly praised". Nevertheless it was looted with other works of art by the Soviet Army and restituted to East Berlin in 1958, where it was restored (and again in 1977).
