= The Virgin and Child (school of Donatello) =

Relief by Donatello

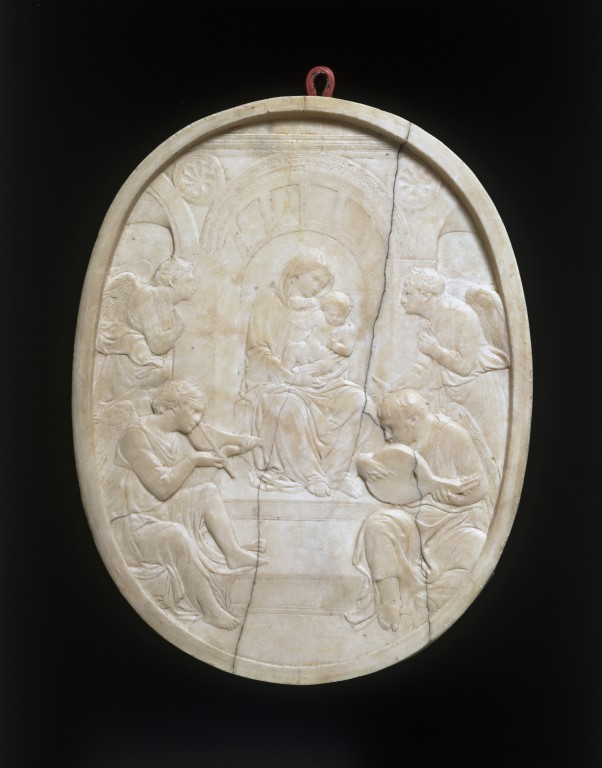

The Virgin and Child is a c.1426 stiacciato marble relief produced by a pupil or studio assistant of the Italian Renaissance sculptor Donatello, probably after a drawing or autograph sculpture by the master himself. It is sometimes known as the Hildburgh Madonna after Walter Leo Hildburgh, who in 1956 donated it to its present owner the Victoria and Albert Museum in London. It is dated to 1426 by comparison to Masaccio's Madonna and Child, produced that year and from which it draws its details of its composition.
