= Chellini Madonna =

Sculpture by Donatello

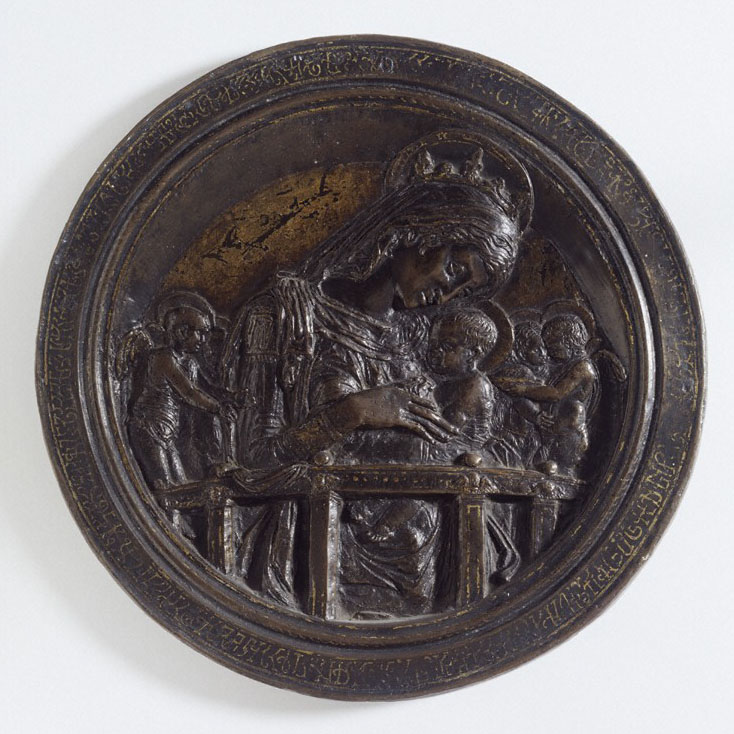
- Artist: Donatello
- Year: c. 1450
- Medium: Gilded bronze
- Dimensions: Diameter: 28.5cm
- Location: Victoria and Albert Museum; London
- Accession: A.1-1976

The Virgin and Child with Four Angels, also known as the Chellini Madonna, is a bronze roundel by the Florentine artist Donatello in the Victoria and Albert Museum, London.

The roundel was given by Donatello to his doctor Giovanni Chellini in 1456. This was documented in the physician's account book on 27 August 1456: "while I was treating Donato called Donatello, the singular and principal master in making figures of bronze of wood and terracotta... he of his kindness and in consideration of the medical treatment which I had given and was giving for his illness gave me a roundel the size of a trencher in which was sculpted the Virgin Mary with the Child at her neck and two angels on each side." The reverse of the roundel is hollowed out, creating a mould for casting replicas of the image in molten glass. In order to test out this unique feature, copies of the roundel were made from which glass versions were cast.

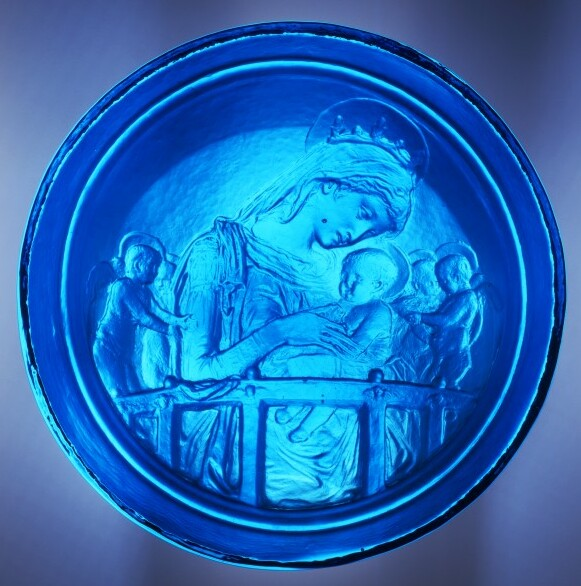
Glass mould of the Chellini Madonna

== Bibliography ==
- Jackson, Anna, ed. (2001). V&A: A Hundred Highlights. V&A Publications.
