= Luxorius (saint) =

3rd-century Sardinian official

Luxurius
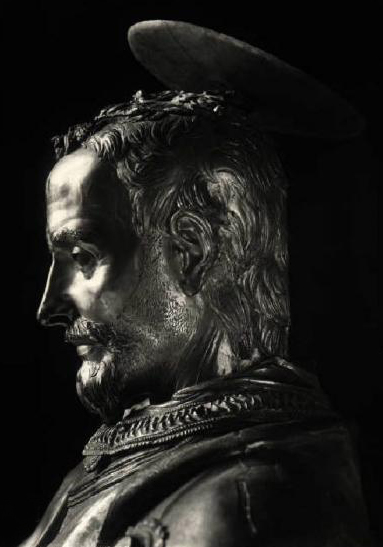
- Donatello, San Rossore Reliquary
- Born: 3rd century
- Died: 21 August, probably in 304; Forum Traiani (now Fordongianus)
- Venerated in: Roman Catholic Church
- Feast: 21 August
- Attributes: Palm branch

Luxurius or Luxorius (Italian - Lussorio; Pisan dialect - Rossore) was an ancient Roman official on Sardinia in the late 3rd and early 4th centuries. Apparitor to Delphius, the praeses or governor of the island, he was converted to Christianity by reading the Psalms. He possibly was beheaded on 21 August for refusing to sacrifice to idols in the city of Forum Traiani (present-day Fordongianus), probably in 304 during the fourth of Diocletian's persecutions. Later he was venerated as a martyr and saint by the Roman Catholic Church.

== Sources ==
The main source for his martyrdom are the 5th century Martyrologium Hieronimianum and the Passio sancti Luxorii martyris (Codex Sancrucensis 13 cc. 238–239). The latter was written in the years immediately after 1181 and is now held in Heiligenkreuz Abbey, a Cistercian house in Austria.

In the story of the Passio the judicial action is proposed in the form of a religious dispute, characteristic of the hagiographic literary genre, in which we witness the courageous attempt of the accused to persuade the judge not to persevere in his idolatry. For his part, the Roman magistrate makes every possible attempt not to be forced to apply the imperial decree in its extreme consequences. Understandable attitude, if you take into account that until the time of his arrest Lussorio was his close collaborator. The text of the Passio responds, at least in part, to the canons of the late ancient martyr tales, rather than to the epic passio of the low medieval period, and is devoid of those fantastic elements that distinguish other hagiographic tales.

== Narrative ==
At the time of the Roman emperors Diocletian and Maximian, Luxorius was apparitor (assistant) to Delphius, the praeses (provincial governors) of Sardinia, who, in the course of his official duties, came into possession of the Holy Scriptures. Driven by the desire to know the Psalms he began to leaf through them and in reading them he was so impressed that he converted to Christianity. He began to pray, to deny idols and to apply himself to the study of the Sacred Text. Arrested as a result of a complaint and brought in chains in front of the praeses, Lussorio faced the disapproval of the Roman magistrate who accused him of having failed to his trust, to despise the orders of the emperors and to consider blasphemous the sacrifices made to the gods. The result was a heated and polemical confrontation against idolatry, in which Luxorius replied firmly to every question of the magistrate, who presented him with the irrevocable choice between sacrifice to the gods and death. To his refusal to sacrifice, Delphius ordered that Luxorius be chained with heavy irons and transferred to prison.

Some days later Delphius ordered that Luxorius be brought back in front of his tribunal. A new dispute arose at the end of which the magistrate, convinced that not even the worst torments would move Luxorius, ordered the death sentence. The bodyguards of Delphius brought Luxorius to a pagan temple located near the city of Forum Traiani, where he faced death by decapitation, twelve days before the calends of September (August 21) and where he was buried in a crypt.

== Veneration ==
A marble Latin inscription dating to the 6th century built into the south side of san Lussorio church about 1.5 km from Fordongianus attests to his cult at that date: "(H)ic effusus est sangu(is) / beatissimi martyris / Luxuri. Celebratur / natale eius XII c(a)l(enda)s S(e)p(tem)b(re)s / renobatu(r) sup temporibus Helia(e) ep(is)c(o)p(i)."

The basic elements of martyrdom are also contained in the Martyrologium Hieronymianum, which dates in its original formulation to the first half of the fifth century.

In 599 Gregory the Great wrote a letter to Januarius, bishop of Cagliari, referring to a monastery dedicated to saints Gavinus and Luxurius, in Cagliari, showing the spread of Luxurius' cult across Sardinia. Churches are dedicated to San Lussario in Oliena, Romana, Selargiusm and elsewhere.

=== Patronage ===
He is the patron saint of several Italian cities, the largest of which is Pisa (where he is honored under the name of "Rossore". In Borore, a small town in central Sardinia, San Lussorio Martire is the patron saint. The saint is celebrated twice a year: in April, with an almost exclusively religious ceremony, and in August with important religious and civil celebrations that last three days (20-21-22), followed by novenas in the rural sanctuary dedicated to the saint.

=== Relics ===
The relics of San Lussorio were reportedly transferred from Sardinia to Pavia in 722 together with those of Saint Augustine by the Lombard king Liutprand. A second tradition has it that the relics are kept in Pisa, transported in 1088 from Sardinia to their cathedral, where it is called San Rossore, a name derived from the corruption of the name Luxorius to Ruxorius. During the restoration of the archbishopric of Pisa in 1796, a marble ark was found containing bones and three sheets of lead with inscriptions. It is possible that part of the martyr's relics are preserved in both cities.

The cult of St. Luxorius spread also in the rest of Tuscany and in 1422 the Humiliati friars of Florence obtained to transfer the relics from Pisa to this city, where they were preserved in the church of Ognissanti. In 1427 these friars turned to Donatello to shape a bronze bust of the Saint to be used as a reliquary for the head of Saint Luxorius. The sculptor modeled a beautiful gilded bronze bust, about half a meter high, (now preserved in Pisa in the Museo Nazionale di San Matteo) that was kept by the Florentine friars until the suppression of the Order in 1571.
