= Madonna and Child (Donatello, Louvre) =

Terracotta relief attributed to Donatello

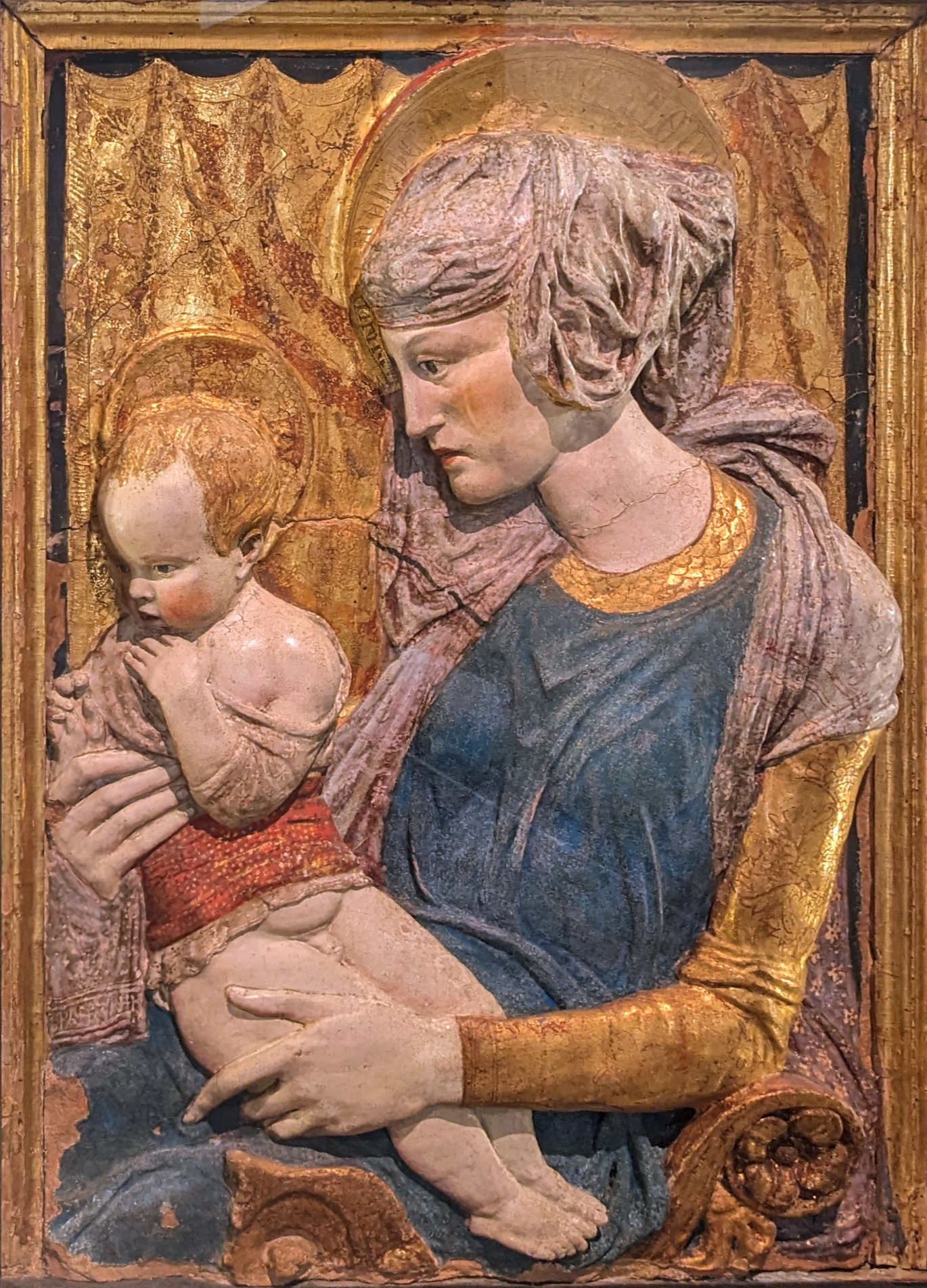

Madonna and Child is a c. 1440 painted terracotta relief attributed to Donatello of the Madonna and Child that is now in the Louvre.

Ludwig Goldscheider states in his book Donatello, "There are no Madonna reliefs that can be accepted with perfect confidence as having been chiseled by Donatello" (Not that chisels would have been used to make a terracotta relief.)
