= Basilica del Santo Crucifix =

Sculpture by Donatello

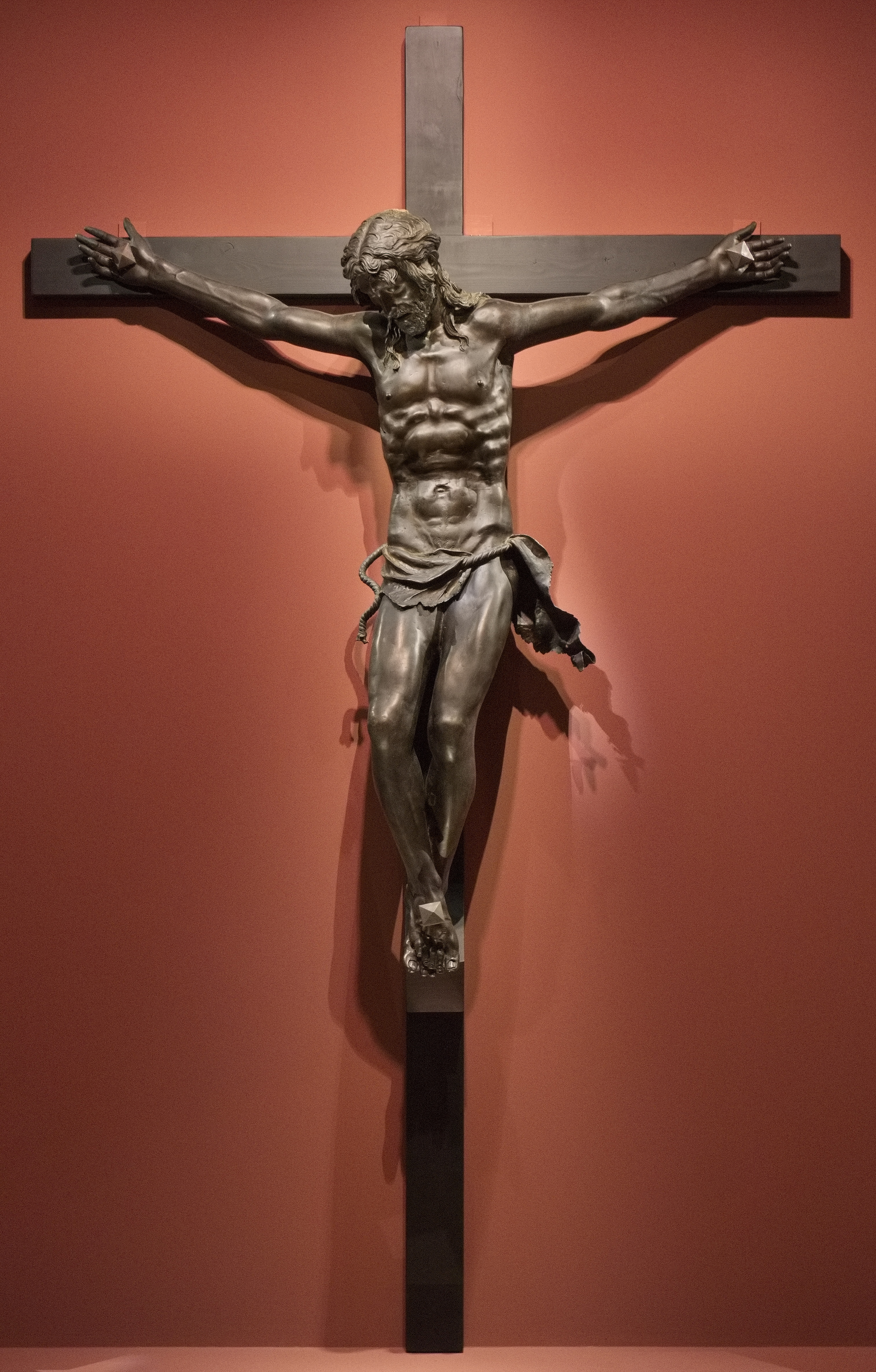
The cruzifix on display in the Donatello exhibition, Berlin 2022

The Basilica del Santo Crucifix is a 1444–1447 bronze sculpture by Donatello on the high altar of the Basilica of Saint Anthony of Padua in Padua. It measures 180 by 166 cm; his only monumental bronze on that scale prior to that date had been his 1423–1425 Saint Louis of Toulouse. The work was originally nude, with a textile loincloth probably intended to be added; the current bronze one is a Baroque addition. The work also marks a development away from the exaggerated realism of his youthful Santa Croce Crucifix.

Probably the artist's first important commission in Padua, it may have even been the offer of producing this work in bronze (a difficult and costly material) which tempted him to leave Florence for Padua in 1443. He acquired the wax for its modello in 1444 and the work was first displayed in the basilica in 1447, with Donatello paid the last installment of his fee in 1449. He was working on the fencing for the choir at the same time and so the crucifix was probably originally intended for the centre of that space rather than the high altar. It does not form part of the artist's 1446–1450 scheme of reliefs for that altar, though it was so highly prized by the monks that it probably gained him that later commission.
