= Madonna of the Cords =

Sculpture by Donatello

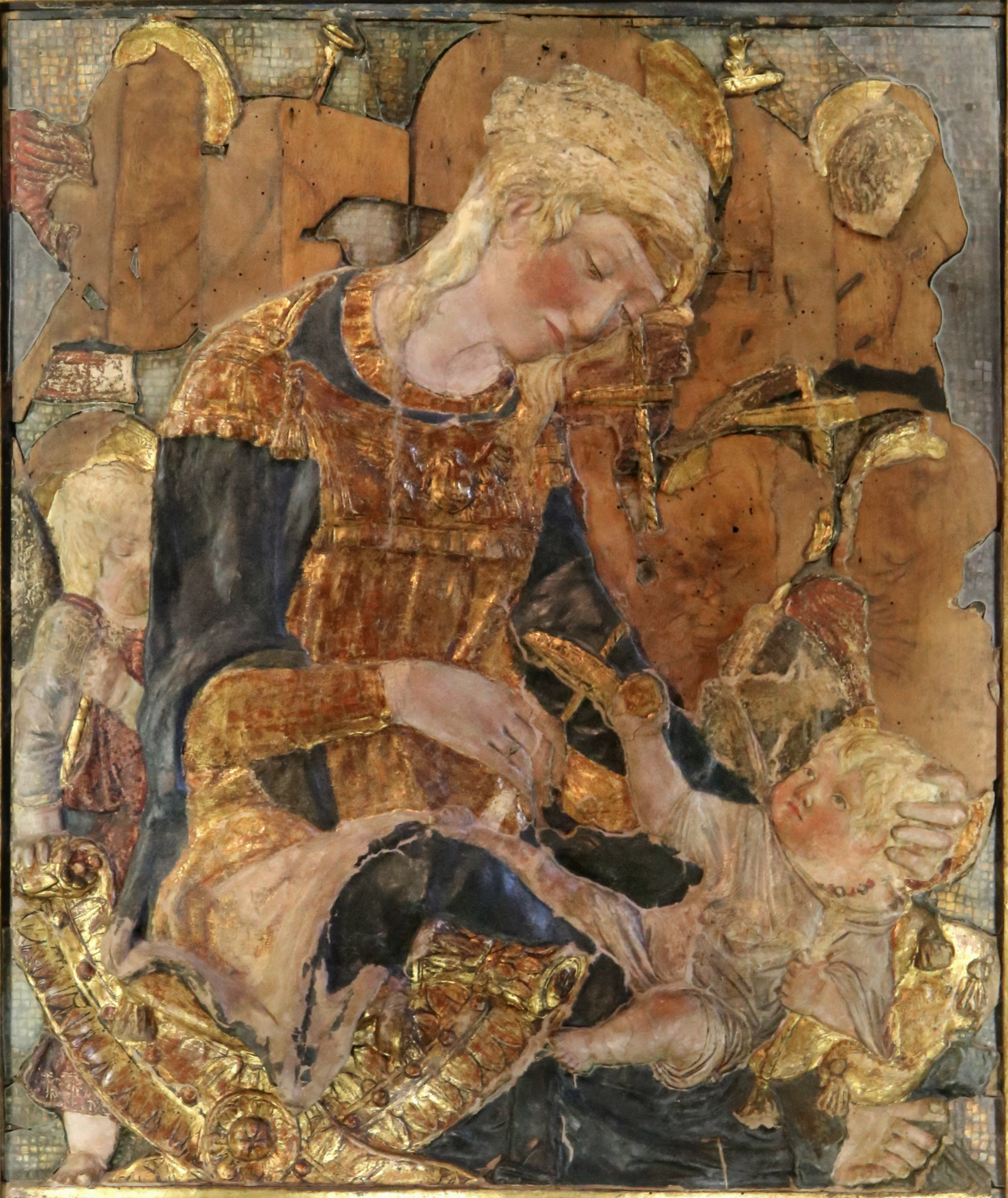
Madonna of the Cords (c. 1433-1435) by Donatello

The Madonna of the Cords (Italian - Madonna dei Cordai) is a c. 1433–1435 relief sculpture attributed to Donatello. It was acquired by Stefano Bardini and is in the Museo Bardini, in Florence, since 1922.

The work is multi-material: on a wooden base engraved with fillings is the Madonna and the Child, in polychrome stucco, with a mosaic background with silver-plated leather tesserae, meccated and covered with glass, and presents applications of ropes.
