= Madonna of the Apple =

15th-century sculpture

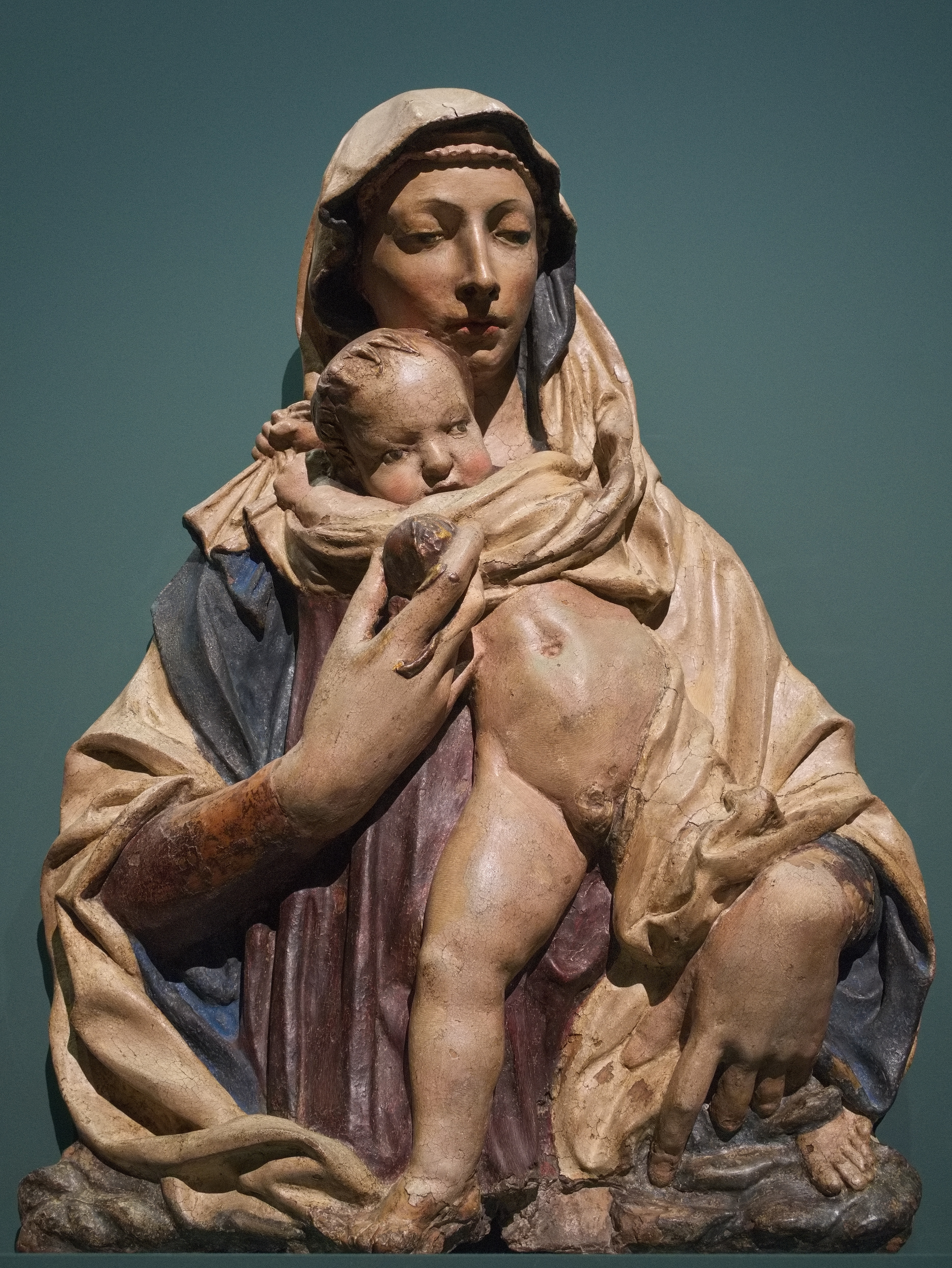
Madonna of the Apple (c. 1400–1425)

Madonna of the Apple (Italian - Madonna della Mela) is a c. 1400–1425 terracotta sculpture attributed to Donatello or Luca della Robbia, with Jacopo della Quercia also suggested in the past. It is now in the Museo Bardini, in Florence.

Its collector Stefano Bardini recorded it as coming from Scarperia and attributed it to Lorenzo Ghiberti, though De Nicola held it definitely to be the work of Nanni di Banco. Krautheimer associated it with other Madonnas produced by artists from Donatello's circle such as the Kress Madonna in the National Gallery of Art, the stucco of Saint Andrew in Siena and the Madonna and Child in the Los Angeles County Museum. It is now generally thought to be an autograph work by Donatello, produced as a private commission around the time of his St John the Evangelist for the facade of Florence Cathedral (1409) or his St Louis of Toulouse for Orsanmichele (1423).
