= San Rossore Reliquary =

Sculpture by Donatello

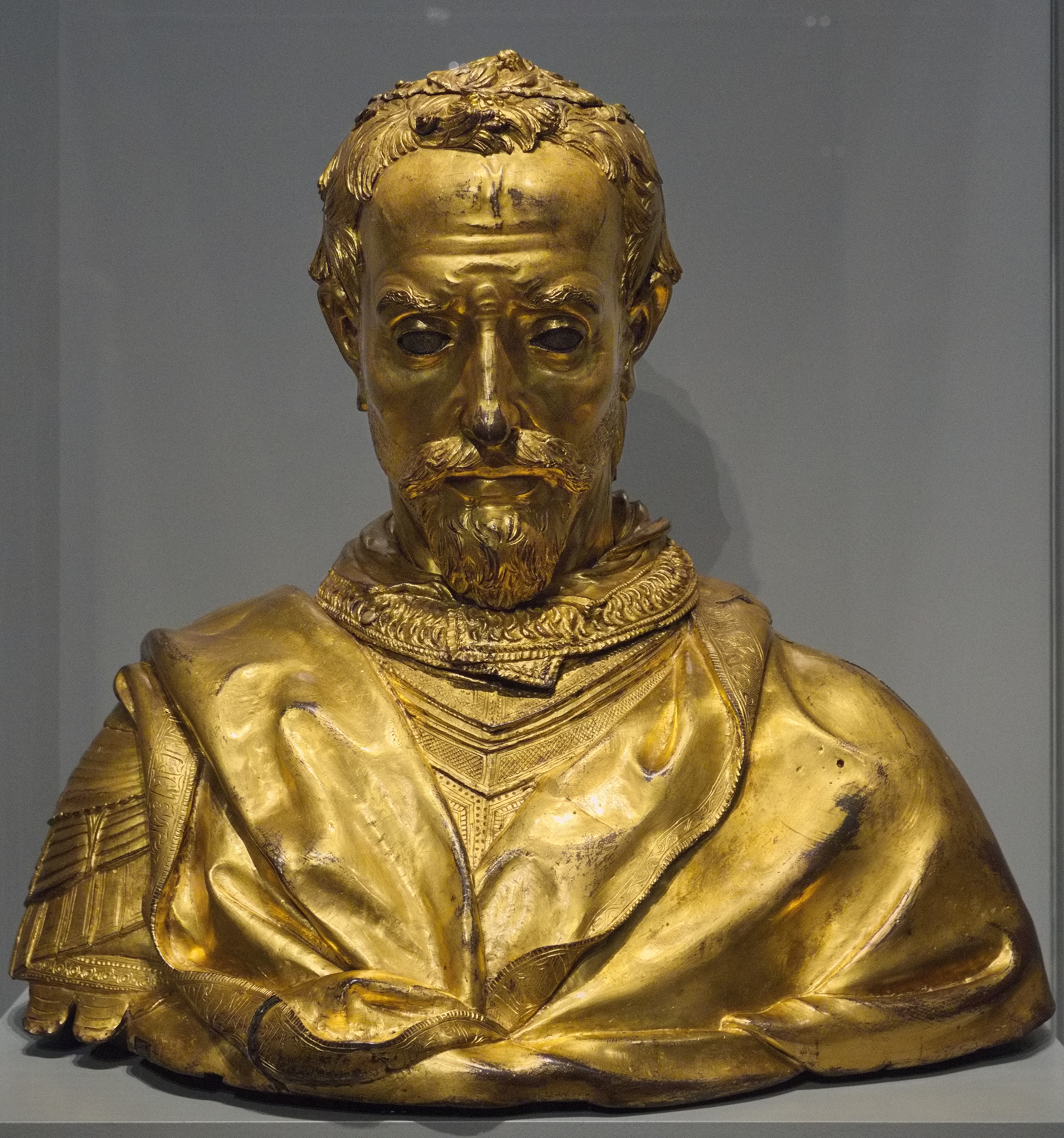
- Artist: Donatello
- Year: 1424–1427
- Medium: Gilded bronze sculpture
- Dimensions: 56 cm × 60.5 cm (22 in × 23.8 in)
- Location: Museo Nazionale di San Matteo; Pisa

The San Rossore Reliquary is a gilded bronze sculpture of 1424–1427 by Donatello. The monks of Ognissanti, Florence had acquired the skull of Saint Luxorius (popularly known in Pisa as "san Rossore") in 1422 and two years later they commissioned the reliquary to house it. The casting was handled by Jacopo degli Stroza who created it of five individual cold-assembled parts. The sculpture is documented as being in Pisa in 1591 and is now in the city's Museo Nazionale di San Matteo.

== Description ==
The work marks a clear break with the previous medieval tradition of the production of reliquaries. The sculpted saint is very far from the hieratic and metaphysical typification that a devotional object traditionally required, being worked as a realistic "Roman-style" bust, that is, like ancient statues. Some details are selectively taken up from ancient portraits, such as the definition of the short beard with engraved dashes, as in the Roman portraiture of the third century. The face has strong and expressive features, which may lead to the assumption that it could be a portrait or even a self-portrait. In reality, the sacredness of the object makes these hypotheses rather unlikely. Indicated by the saint looking down the reliquary was meant to stand somewhere higher up, where it was safe from theft.

== Bibliography ==
- Anita Moskowitz, "Donatello's Reliquary Bust of Saint Rossore", The Art Bulletin, Vol. 63, No. 1 (March, 1981), pp. 41–48. Available online as pdf
- Rolf C. Wirtz, Donatello, Könemann, Cologne 1998. ISBN 3-829002440
