= Putti candle-holders =

Pair of sculptures by Donatello

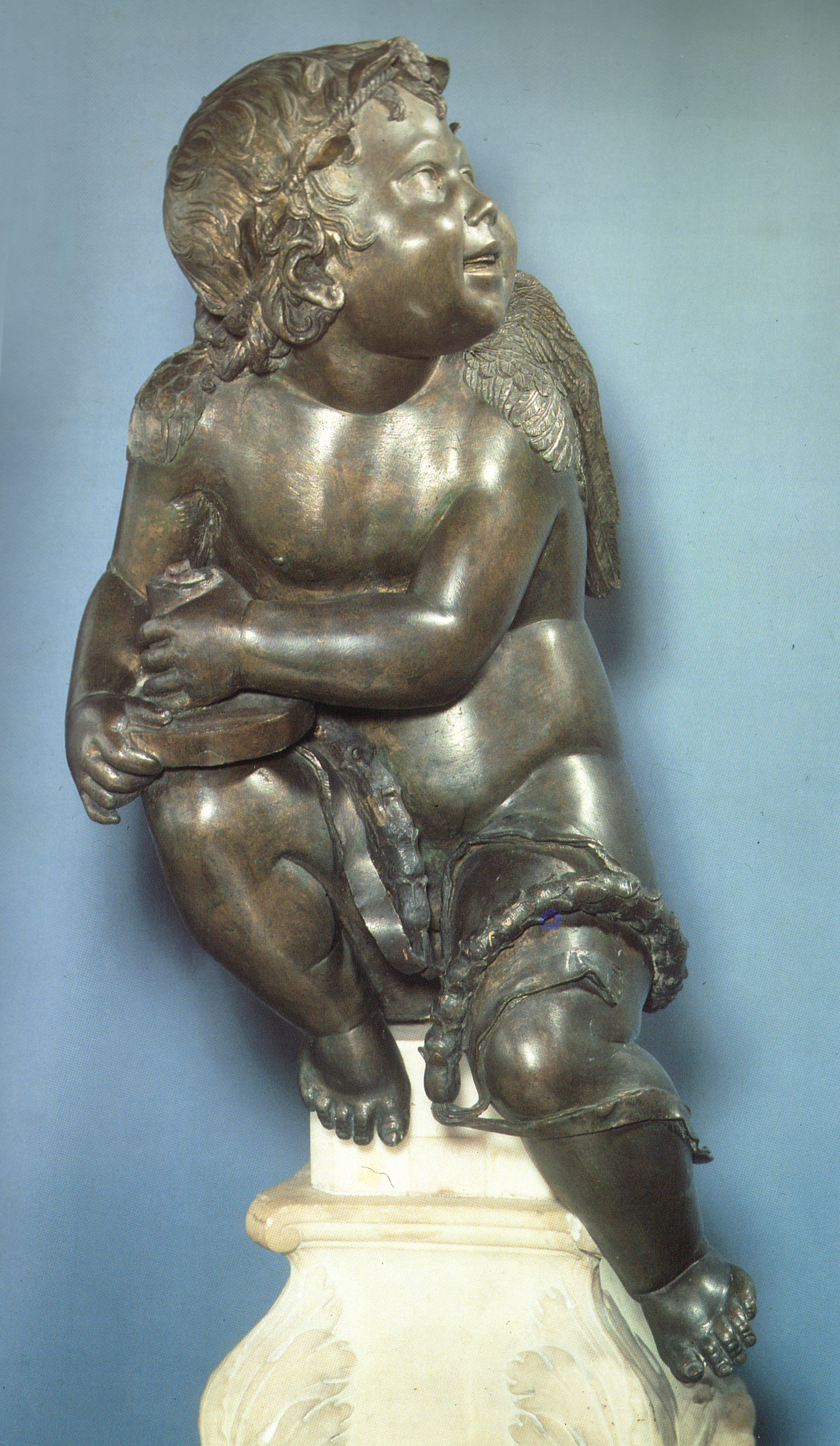

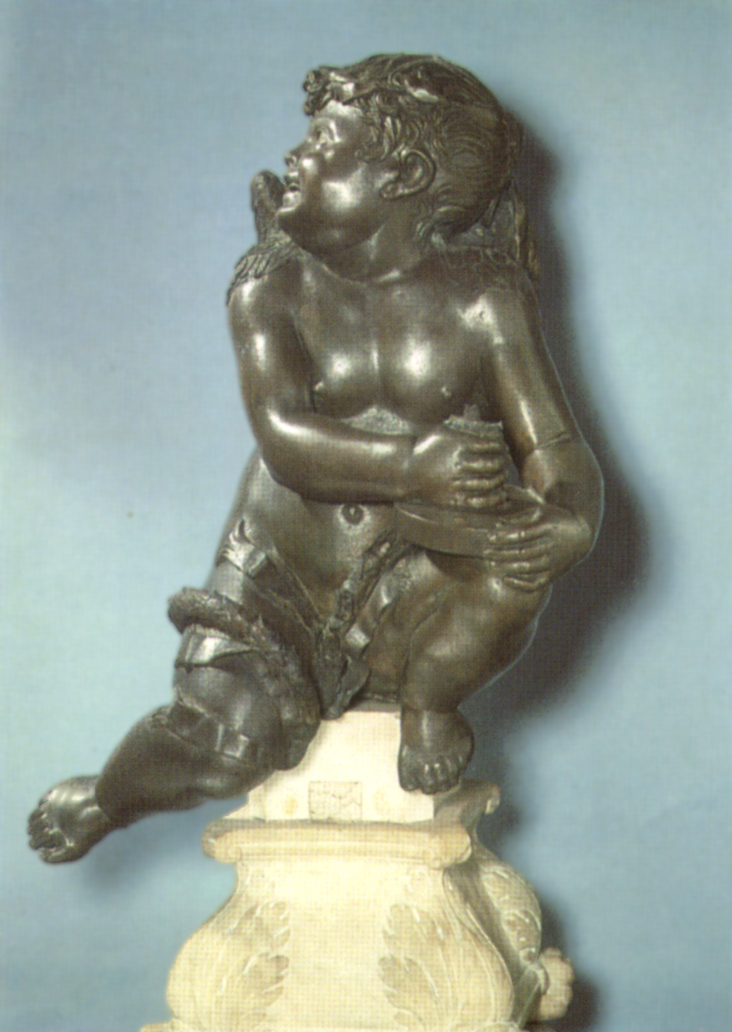

The Putti candle-holders are a pair of c.1434-1439 sculptures by Donatello, now in the Musée Jacquemart-André in Paris.

The two works were two child angels described by Vasari as being on the cantoria di Luca della Robbia in Florence Cathedral. The attribution to Donatello is almost universally accepted today and many theorise that they may have been produced to top the cantoria di Donatello in the same location.

== Bibliography ==
- (in Italian) Rolf C. Wirtz, Donatello, Könemann, Colonia 1998. ISBN 3-8290-4546-8
