= Pazzi Madonna =

Sculpture by Donatello

The Pazzi Madonna
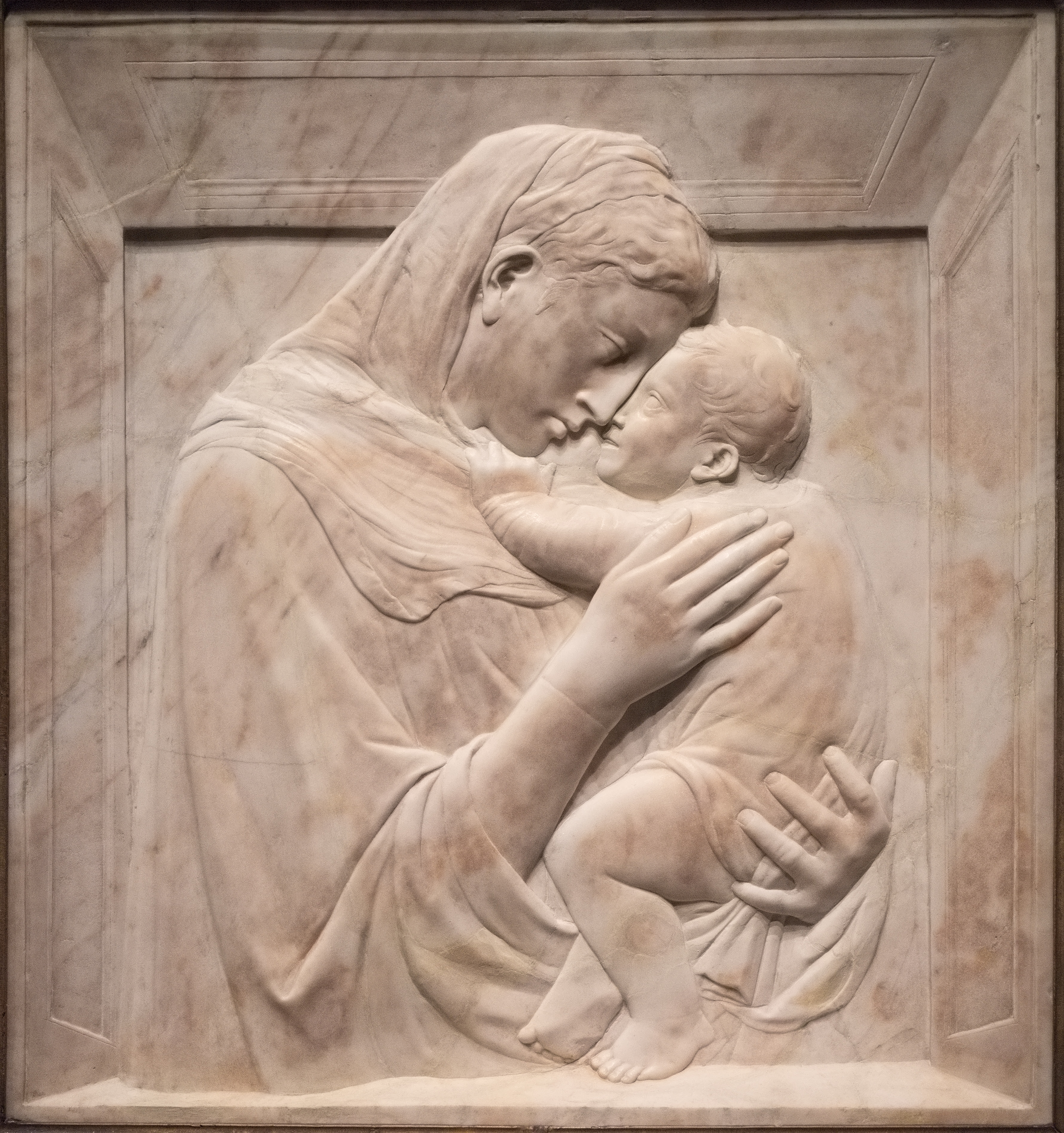
- Artist: Donatello
- Year: 1420 or 1422
- Catalogue: Inv. 51
- Medium: marble relief sculpture
- Dimensions: 74,5 cm × 73 cm × 6,5 cm (29,3 in × 27,3 in × 26 in)
- Location: Bode-Museum, Sculpture Collection and Museum of Byzantine Art, Berlin
- Owner: Staatliche Museen zu Berlin

The Pazzi Madonna is a rectangular "stiacciato" marble relief sculpture by Donatello; it has been held in the sculpture collections of the Bode-Museum in Berlin since 1886. It is one of many Madonna and Child reliefs and depicts the Virgin Mary holding the Christ Child in a half-length framework. It is a unique relief for its absence of paint and reliance on spatial and physical presence. It is the earliest surviving Madonna and Child relief from Donatello, though its exact date of creation is undetermined.

Dating to around 1420 and 1430 at the beginning of Donatello's collaboration with Michelozzo, it was most likely produced for private devotion and possibly commissioned by the Pazzi family for their home in Florence. The composition was very popular and is known in several copies.

== History ==
Donatello's Pazzi Madonna is the earliest surviving of many relief sculptures depicting the "mother and child" religious imagery during the Renaissance. Its name originates from the Palazzo Pazzi, where it was previously held, and not much of its history is confirmed apart from a purchase in 1886 that moved the relief from the Palazzo Pazzi to the Bode-Museum in Berlin. When the Palazzo Pazzi was undergoing demolition, the artwork was given to an unknown intermediary, who then sold it to Wilhelm von Bode for the Bode-Museum. Upon arrival at the museum, the relief was found broken into at least fifteen pieces, and the time at which the damage occurred is unknown.

Regarding the exact year of creation, scholars have long debated the topic. One scholarly position suggests that the artwork was created around 1420 due to stylistic similarities found in a Sibyl made by Donatello in 1422 that may have been derived from the carving of the Virgin's head in the Pazzi Madonna. On the other hand, some scholars argue that the relief sculpture was carved around 1428 to 1430 due to the composition of the relief's Virgin Mary, whose profile is theorized to be inspired by other Roman relief sculptures made by Donatello in the late 1420s.

== Description ==
The half figure of the Virgin Mary is shown in three-quarter-view, the faces of both mother and child are in profile, with the Virgin leaning towards the Christ Child and touching his forehead, her silhouette slightly obscuring his. She holds the baby with her left arm, the hand with braced fingers perspectivally foreshortened, the right hand softly pressing against its shoulder. The Virgin's head is bowed and conceals a portion of the Child's head, while the Child's left arm is also foreshortened alongside the sole of his right foot turned upward. The two figures are not shown with halos, and the emphasis is instead on their tender and intense intimacy, developing themes from the Eleusa-type icon in Byzantine art. The Child reaches out his arm to his mother and grasps the veil upon her head, but their expressions often are described as melancholy.

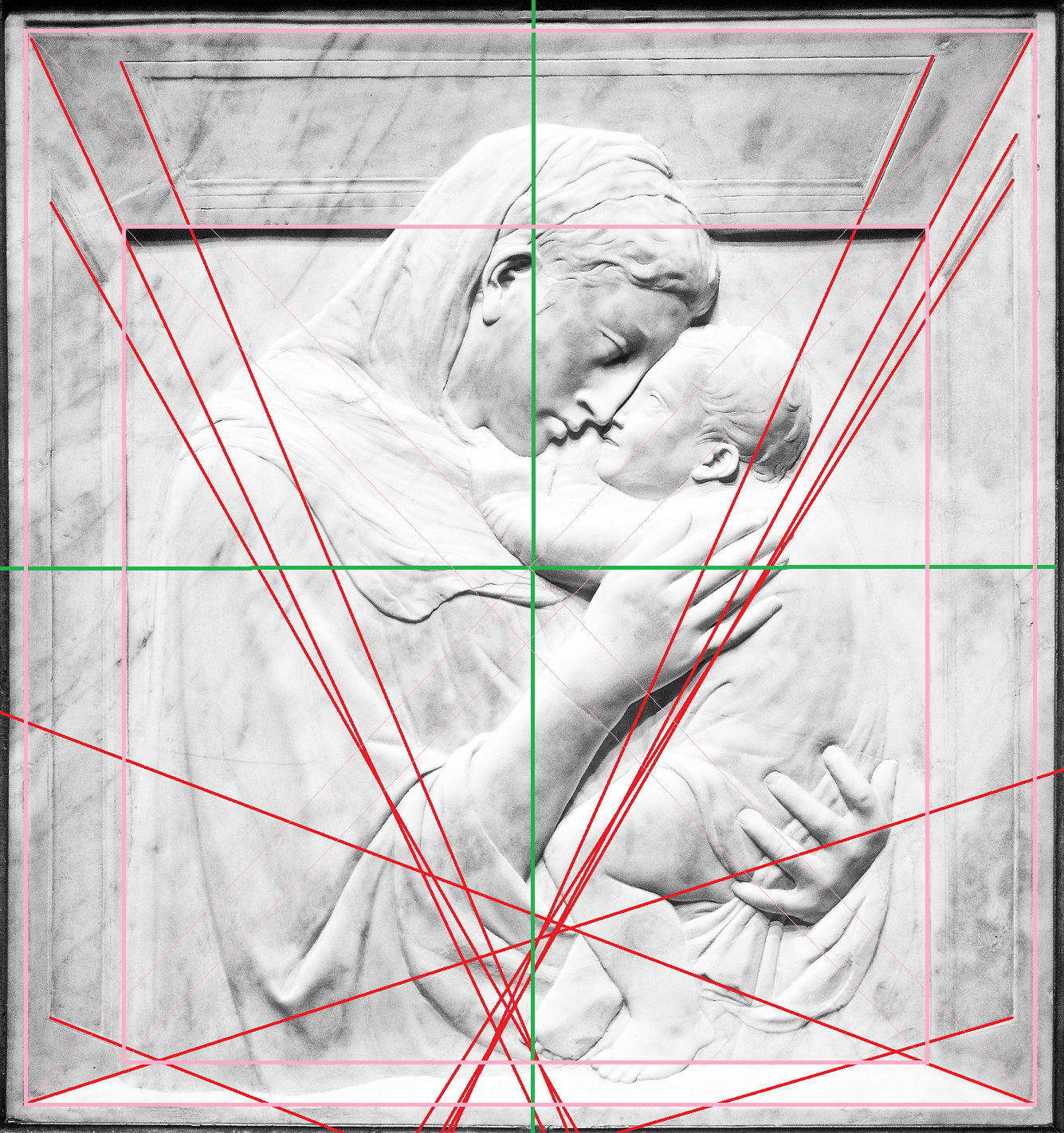
Visualization of the orthogonal lines and vanishing points in the framework of the Pazzi Madonna.

The Pazzi Madonna is distinctive for its treatment of color and space. Unlike polychrome reliefs of the period, the Pazzi Madonna is devoid of color apart from the grey-white and brown veins in the marble. In contrast to high relief sculptures of the period, the work is carved in a shallow plane, using orthogonal lines to simulate depth. Scholars have debated the location and consistency of vanishing points in the relief sculpture, noting up to three possible points of intersection between orthogonal lines. One of them is found in the base's center, and it marks the location where the sculpture was meant to be viewed.

The relief sculpture is well known for its use of perspective. Unlike other reliefs, the Pazzi Madonna is not designed with the surrounding physical space in mind, and is alternatively bounded by what scholars have deemed a "perspective cage." A geometrical foundation of rectangles and squares is used to frame the figures in an enclosed, flat background. Diagonal lines from the upper corners of the frame meet in the center of the base, forming an ordered composition. Scholars have noted that the relief's pattern arrangement creates an illusion of going beyond the world of the frame and into the real world alongside viewers.

== Analysis ==
The way in which the setting and frame of the Pazzi Madonna were designed has been noted by scholars as allowing for a deeper experience of viewing the artwork. In the past, the Pazzi Madonna was arranged so that it would have to be viewed from below, so viewers would often have approached the artwork gazing upwards. This angle created a stronger sense of depth and an illusionistic effect that made the relief appear lifelike and thus drew in viewers. Scholars believe that, given the original arrangement of the relief, viewers would have naturally assumed the position of a devotee kneeling in prayer. While the original placement of the Pazzi Madonna remains undetermined, its general design served to intensify the engagement between the viewer in prayer and the religious figures.

The Pazzi Madonna has also been compared to similar Florentine paintings of the Virgin and Child. Amongst the Florentine paintings, the Virgin and Child are typically depicted in a more carefree manner. The Pazzi Madonna differs in approach, for the two figures are portrayed without any haloes or emblems. According to scholars, the closeness between the Virgin and Child in the Pazzi Madonna resonated with viewers during the fifteenth century, a time when high child mortality rates were widespread.

== Replicas and reproduction ==
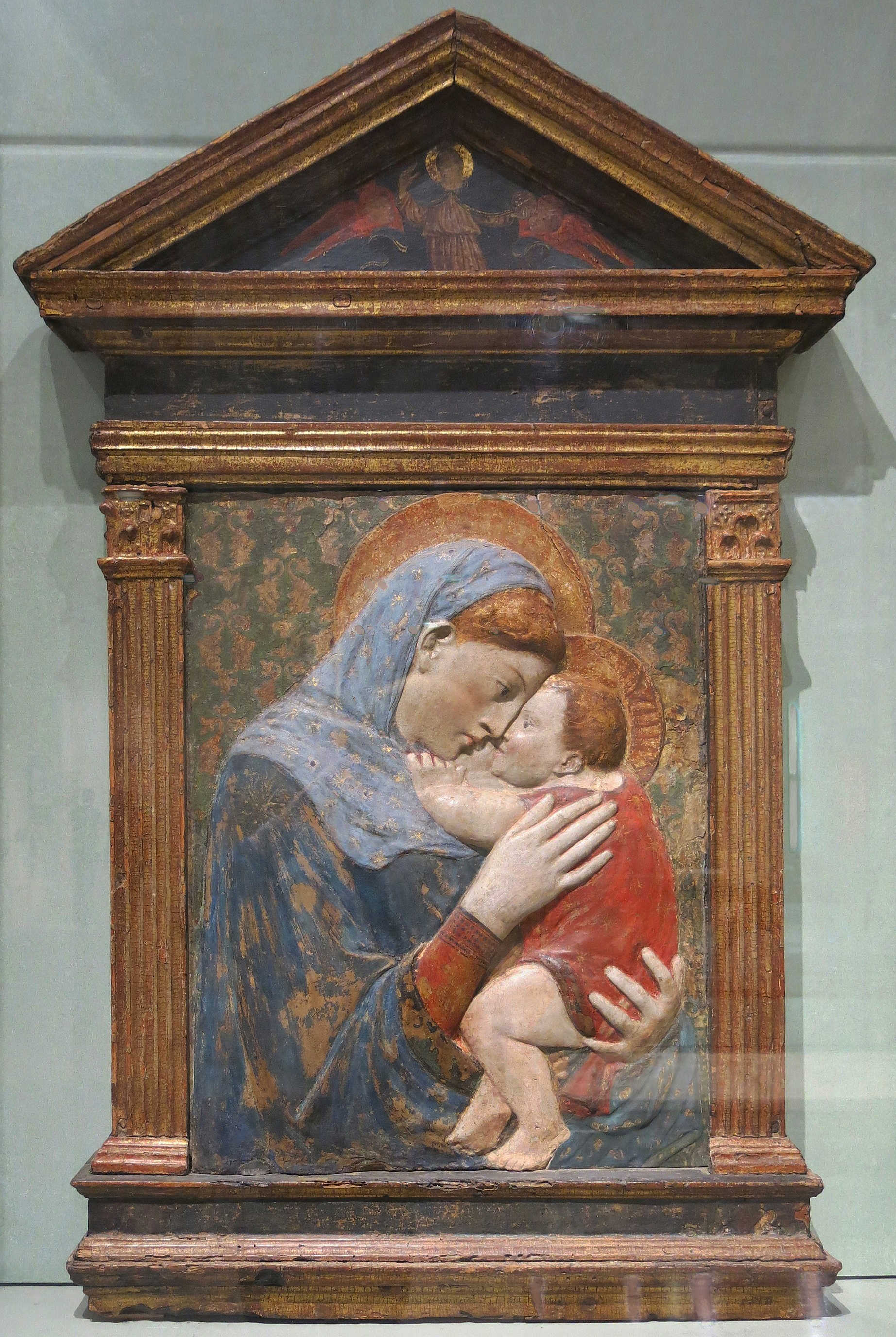
A copy of the Pazzi Madonna located in the Louvre Museum.

The Pazzi Madonna was reproduced in the years following its creation, despite the relief not having been designed with reproduction in mind. Shortly after the creation of the Pazzi Madonna, a mould was taken from the original relief and was used to make many different replicas, with several still surviving today. Existing replicas are currently held in museums such as the Louvre and the National Gallery in Prague. They vary in approach, with some replicas perfectly mimicking both the entire sculpture and setting, and others replicating the Virgin Mary and Christ Child figures alone. Some replicas also added haloes that were absent in the original relief in order to have the artwork align more closely with devotional imagery of the period. While the Pazzi Madonna was not tailored for reproduction like Donatello's later works, such as the Verona Madonna, it was nonetheless widely reproduced across various media.

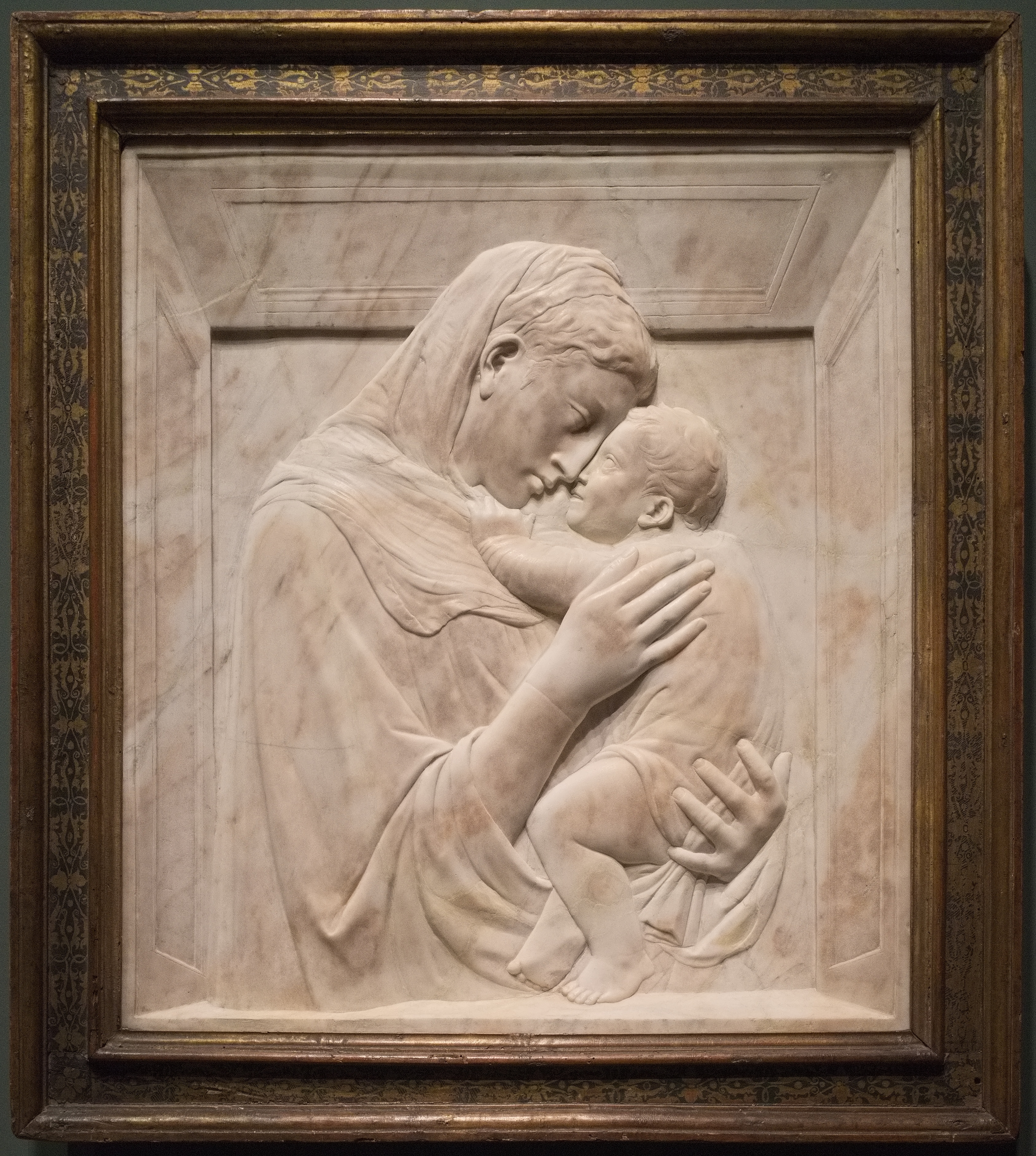
Relief in frame as displayed

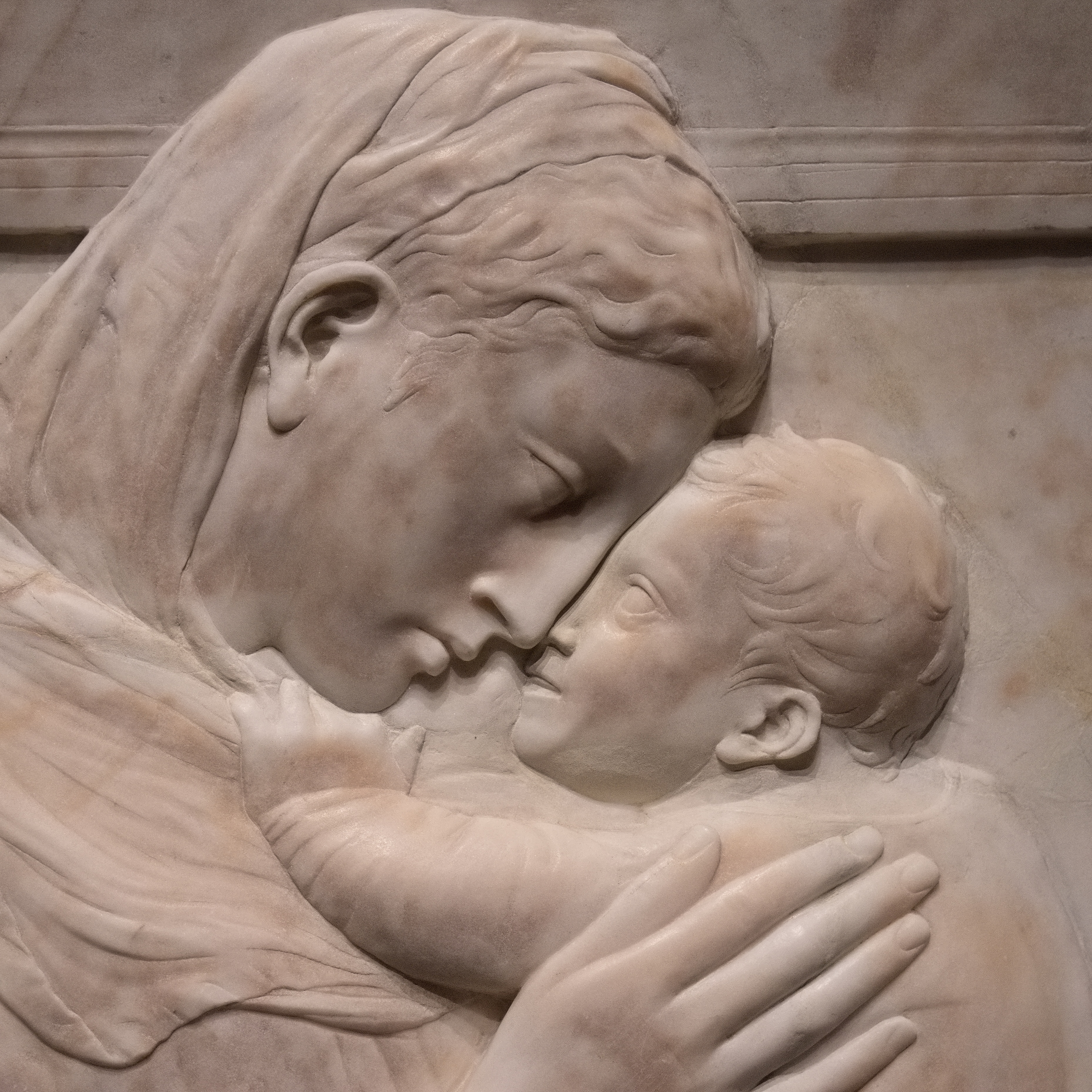
Close-up of heads

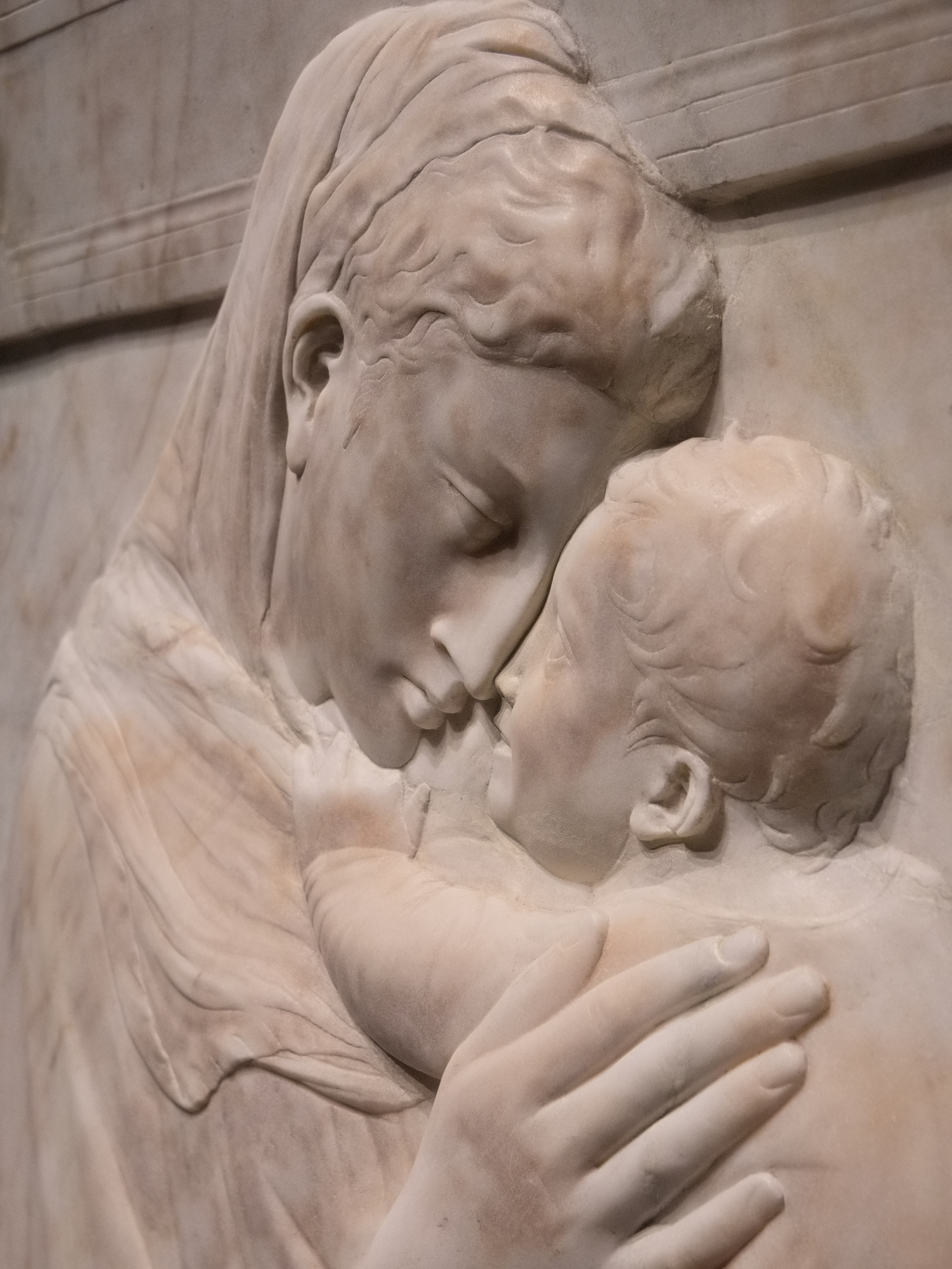
Detail in lateral view

== Literature ==
- Coonin, A. Victor (2019). Donatello and the Dawn of Renaissance Art. London: Reaktion Books. ISBN 978-1-78914-130-6.
- Francesco Caglioti with Laura Cavazzini, Aldo Galli and Neville Rowley (2022). Donatello. The Renaissance. Venice: Marsilio Arte. ISBN 979-12-5463-006-8.
- Neville Rowley with Francesco Caglioti, Laura Cavazzini and Aldo Galli (2022). Donatello. Erfinder der Renaissance. Leipzig: E.A. Seemann. ISBN 978-3-86502-482-4.
