= Huldschinsky Madonna (sculpture) =

Sculpture attributed to Donatello

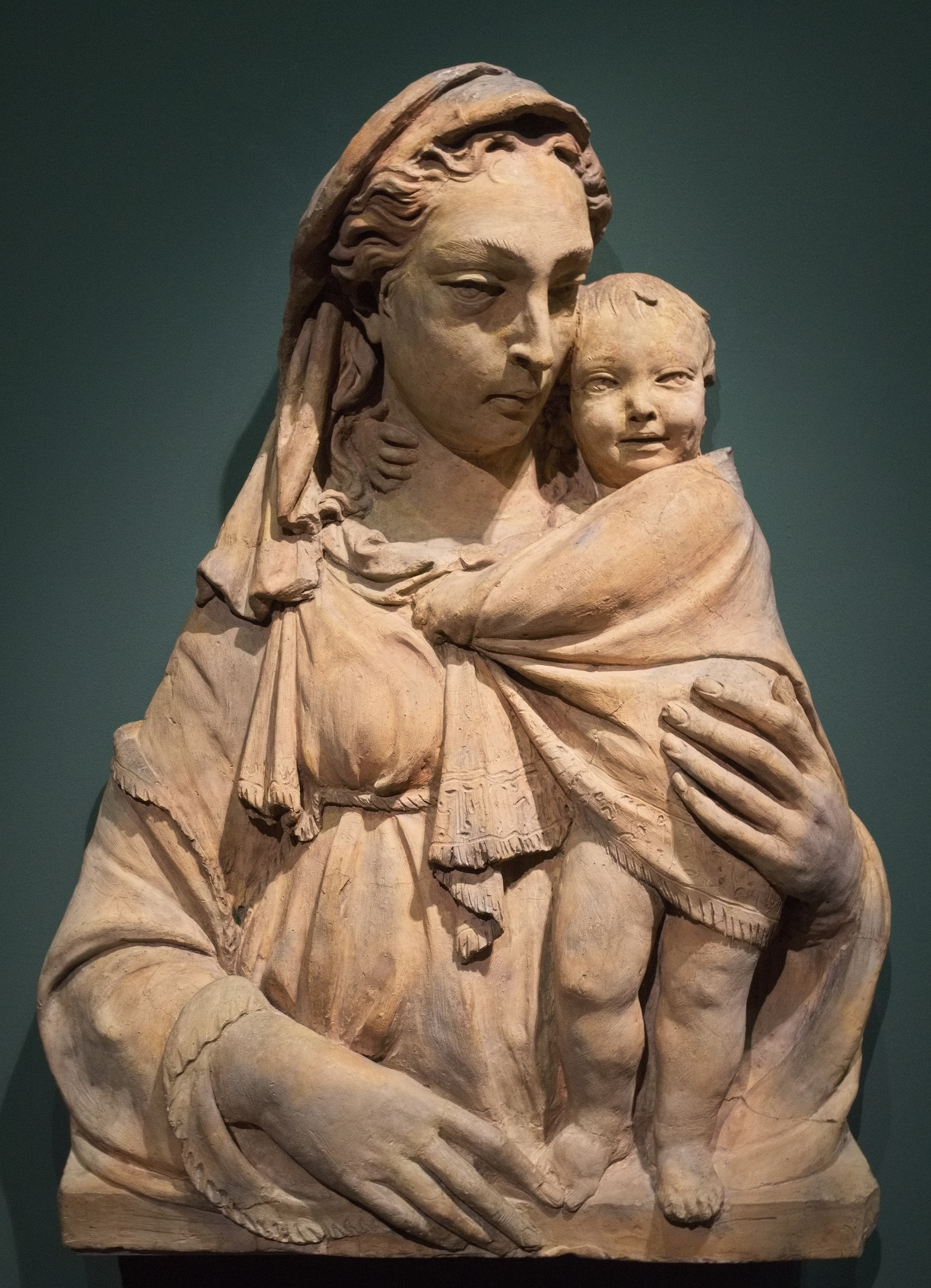
- Artist: Donatello
- Year: 1410–1415
- Catalogue: Inv. 1940
- Medium: Sculpture
- Movement: Early Renaissance
- Subject: Madonna and Child
- Dimensions: 90 x 75 x 24 cm
- Location: Bode Museum, Berlin, Germany
- Owner: Staatliche Museen zu Berlin, Skulpturensammlung

The Huldschinsky Madonna is a terracotta sculpture from the beginning of the 15th century, most probably from around 1410–1415. It is attributed to Donatello, an attribution based on the structure of the drapery, which is no longer simply a means of expression and decoration as in Gothic art but is instead more naturalistic and observed from life, following a strict dialogue with the anatomical forms beneath it and obeying the rules of gravity. The work's attention to detail such as the fringes on the clothing also recalls the artist's other works such as the marble David. The sculpture was formerly painted. It has been in the Bode Museum in Berlin (the Kaiser Friedrich Museum at the time of the work's accession) since being donated by Oscar Huldschinsky in 1892 in Florence, who himself never owned it.
