= Stiacciato =

Sculpture technique

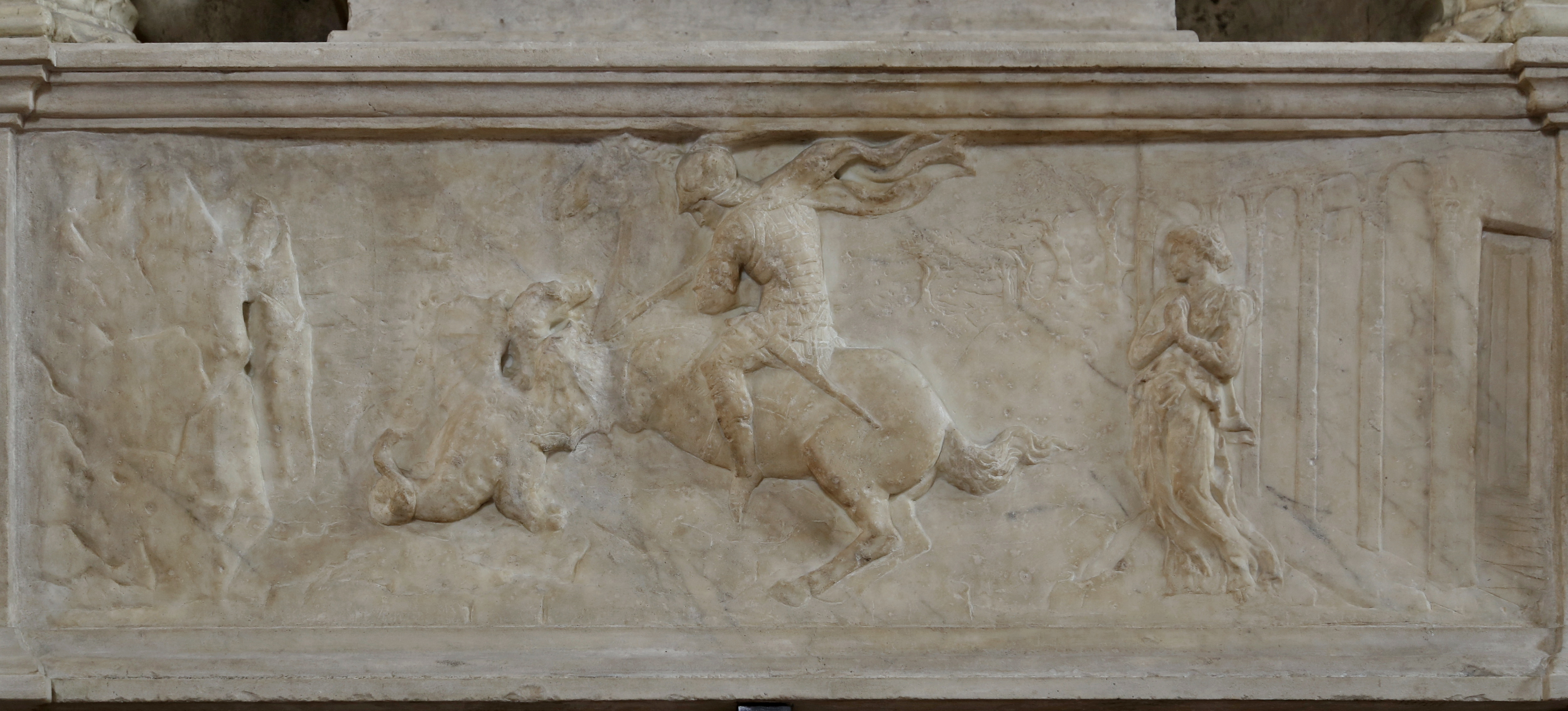
Donatello's Saint George Freeing the Princess of 1417, the first known stiacciato relief

Stiacciato (Tuscan) or schiacciato (Italian for "pressed" or "flattened out") is a technique where a sculptor creates a very shallow relief sculpture with carving only millimetres deep. The rilievo stiacciato is primarily associated with Donatello (1386–1466).

== The technique ==
To give the illusion of space a sculptor used the actual physical depth of a relief, from the most protruding parts of figures with the most plasticity to the flat background plane, which was gilded or otherwise decorated in a two-dimensional manner. The thickness of the carving gradually decreased from the foreground to the background and with further distance in relation to the beholder. In rilievo stiacciato the physical depth may only measure a few centimeters or even millimeters and consist of merely incised lines and minute alterations of the plane. But the different elevations of the objects in the relief do not translate analogous to their place in the space displayed. The gradations are (to be) read as tonal values (valeurs) of light and shade rather than plastic volumes. In that way it is more similar to a two-dimensional monochrome painting or drawing than a three-dimensional sculpture, although undercutting of figures or objects in the foreground is used to gain plasticity. The technique also allows the construction of graphical perspective in the relief.

The most influential art historian and a Renaissance master in his own right, Giorgio Vasari (1511–1574), coined the term and wrote of the technique:

The third type [of reliefs] is called flat and pressed ["stiacciato"] relief, which show nothing but the drawing of the figure in a pressed and flattened out elevation. They are very difficult to execute, because it requires great skill in disegno and inventione, and it is challenging to create gracefulness by contours alone. And in this genre too Donato [ie Donatello] worked better than any other sculptor, with arte, disegno and inventione. Many figures, masks and other ancient scenes of this type have been seen on antique Aretine vases; and similarly on ancient cameos and bronze-stamping cones for medals and coins.

== Donatello and his successors ==
In the fifteenth century the technique was most prominently used for sculptural reliefs. It was introduced and dominated by Donatello, applying it in the majority of cases to marble and bronze, but terracotta and stucco as well. The earliest surviving example is his St. George Freeing the Princess (1416–17), which is also the first surviving example of a perspectival projection, although the spatial illusion is predominantly achieved through the carving technique. His other works in the genre include the so-called Pazzi Madonna (around 1420–30), The Feast of Herod for the Siena Baptistery (1423–27), which is not exclusively stiacciato due to its companion pieces by Lorenzo Ghiberti and others. In about the same period he created The Assumption of the Virgin for Sant'Angelo a Nilo in Naples (1426–28), along with the Hildburgh Madonna (ca. 1426), its execution attributed to his workshop. With The Ascension with Christ Giving the Keys to Saint Peter (1428–30), probably for the guardaroba of Cosimo de' Medici, he accomplished to create even atmosphere. With a very low vanishing point way beneath the bottom line, the scene seems to happen on a hazy hilltop. Maybe his most accomplished work in this technique depicts, once again, a Feast of Herod, and is dated to around 1435 (Palais des Beaux-Arts de Lille).

There were hardly any successors who worked in the technique of relievo stiacciato. In the next generation only Donatello's student Desiderio da Settignano (Saint Jerome in the Desert), Mino da Fiesole and the brothers Antonio and Bernardo Rossellino (Madonna with Child and Two Putti), and Agostino di Duccio, created bas-reliefs of this type. We know one early work from Michelangelo in which he tried out Donatello's technique obviously as a result of studying the master, the Madonna of the Stairs from 1491, when he was 16 years old, and then again over ten years later, in the tondos for the Pitti and the Taddei (around 1503–06).

== Limitations ==
Already in 1275 Vitello spoke of the proportional relationship between the distance of an object and its optical flattening. In the relievo stiacciato, however, the subject of the picture has moved "categorically into the distance". Leonardo da Vinci saw the bas-relief as an overall inadequate hybrid of sculpture and painting and denied the possibility of not only being able to satisfactorily implement a central perspective projection in the relief, but also noted the lack of the aerial perspective that is exclusive to painting, the sfumato. He obviously did not know the relief of The Presentation of the Keys to St. Peter, in which Donatello was able to create exactly this using the most delicate gradations. The proximity to drawing and painting was probably too great to make the effort worthwhile. Painting a relief like that of St. Peter would destroy the effect of the relief work, and the application of paint gives plaster an unsightly and difficult to read rough surface, as Donatello probably saw himself with his tondos in the Sagrestia Vecchia. The intellectual question of the paragone between sculpture and painting, which only became a major topic in the 16th century, was addressed here for the first time to painting, which was nevertheless more dependent on sculpture for models than was ever the case the other way around.

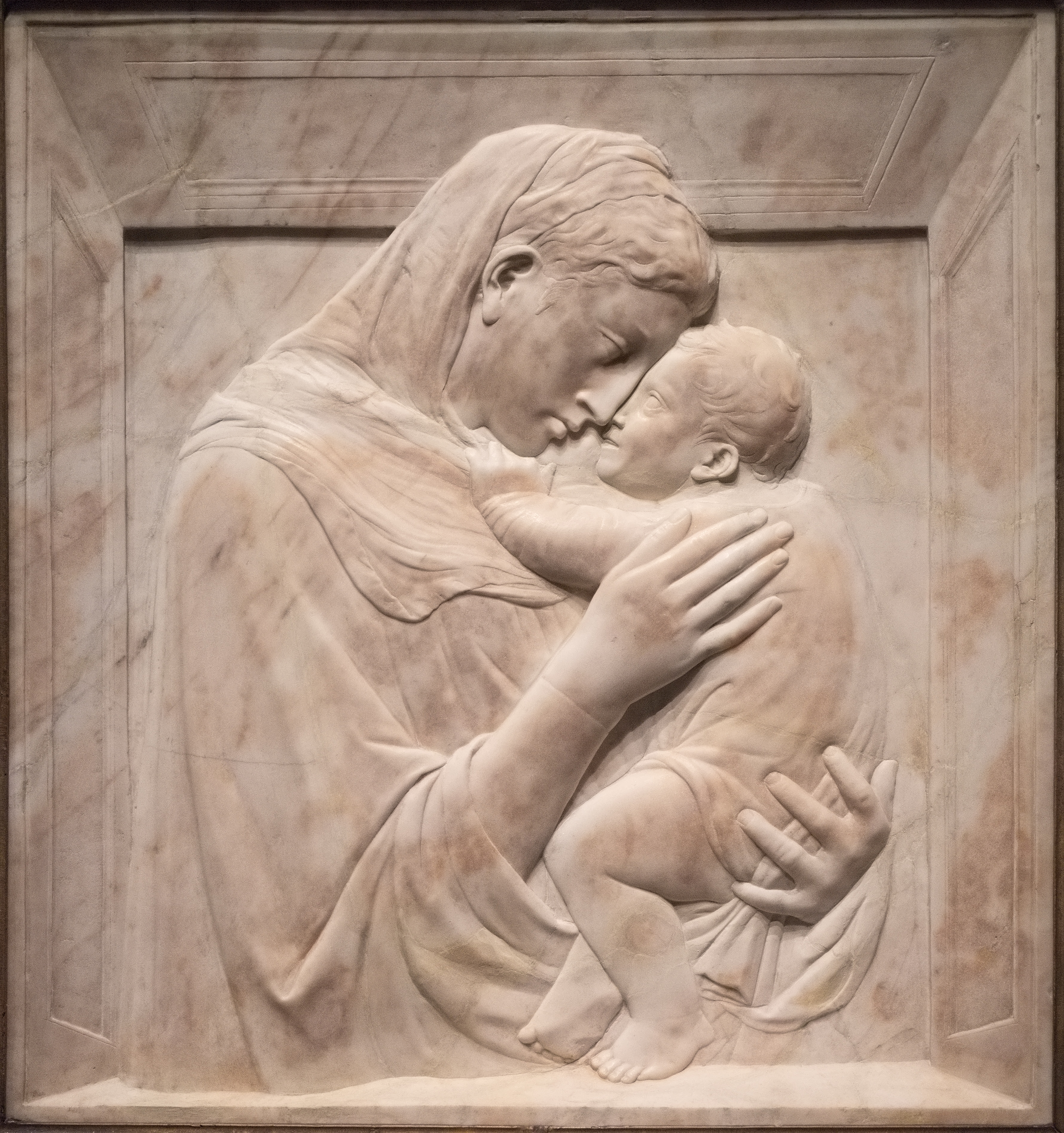
Donatello, Pazzi Madonna, between 1420–30, Bode Museum, Berlin

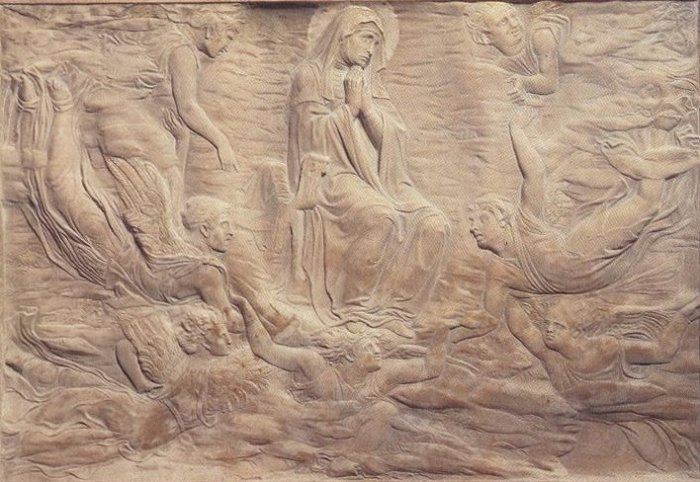
Donatello, Assumption of the Virgin, on the Tomb of Cardinal Rainaldo Brancacci, 1426–28, Sant'Angelo a Nilo, Naples

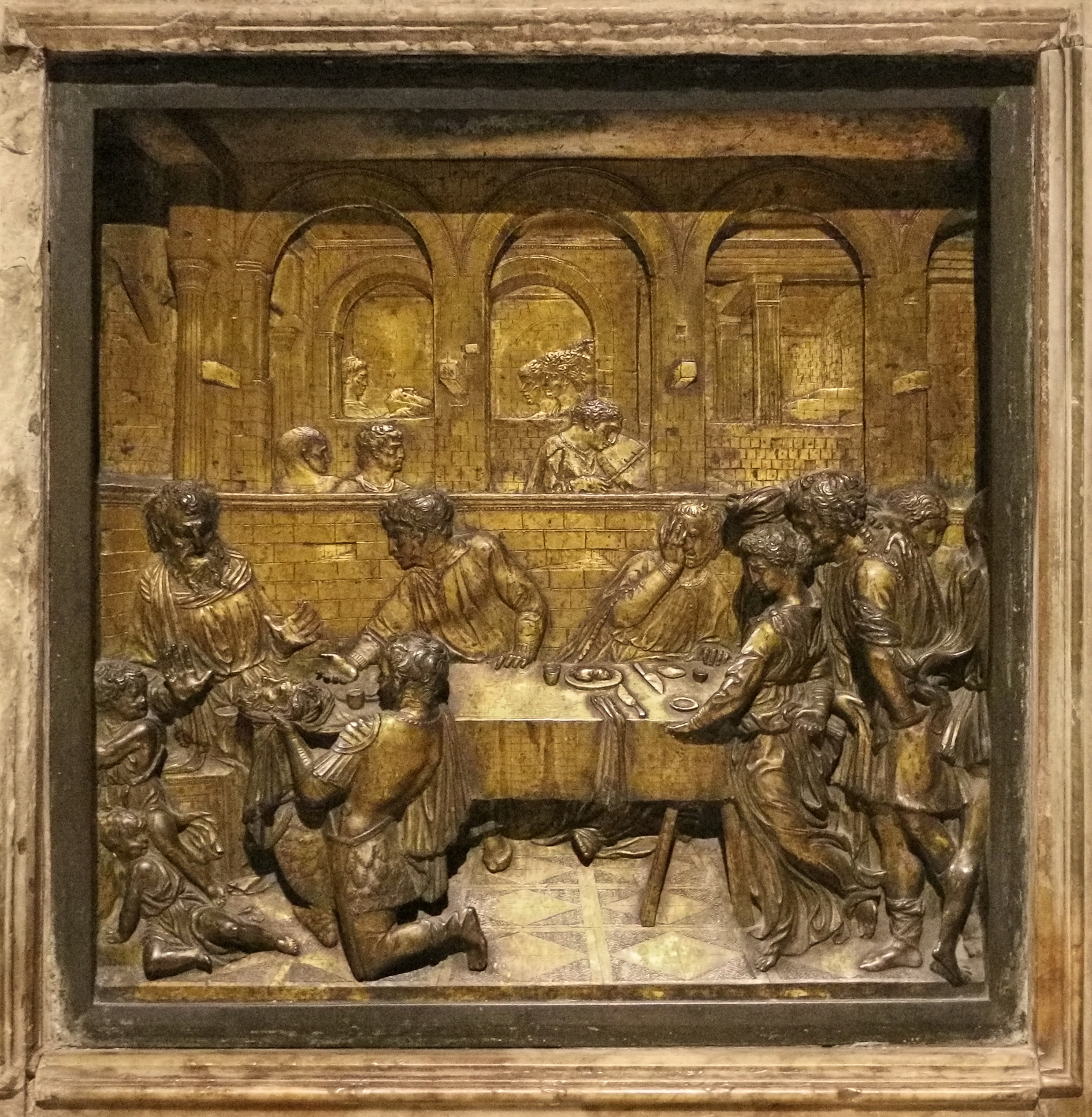
Donatello, The Feast of Herod, Siena Baptistery, 1427

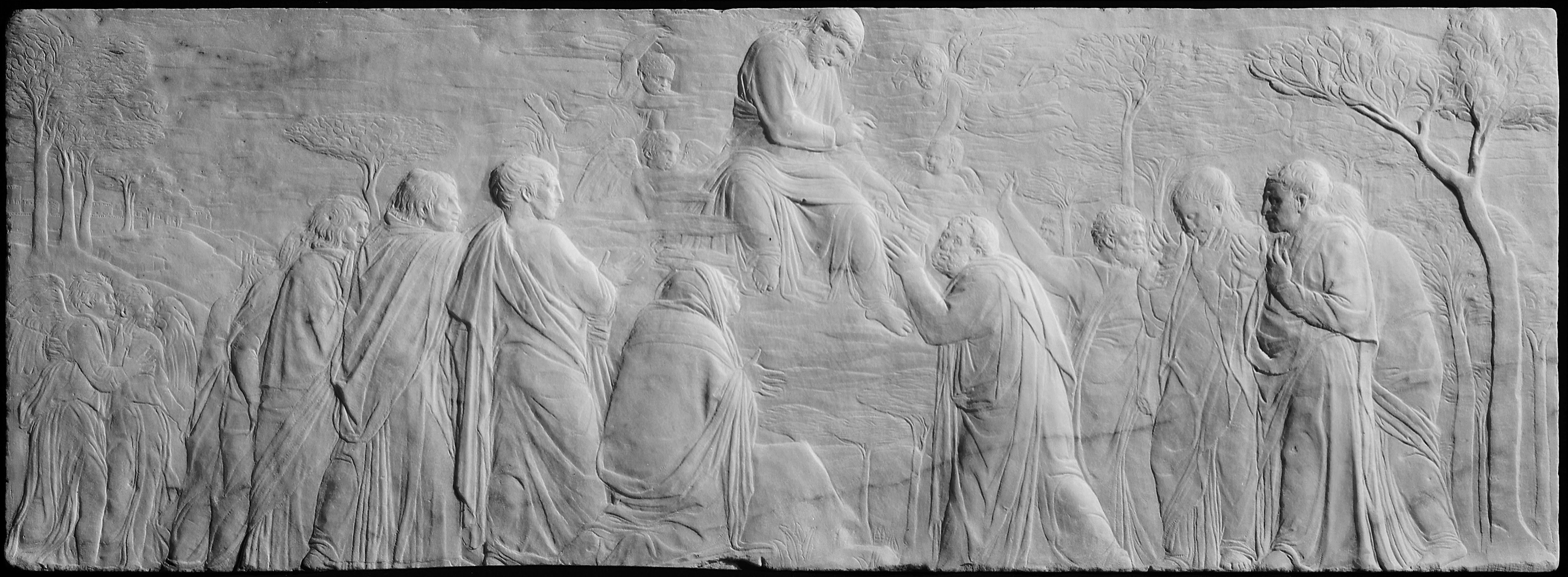
Donatello, The Ascension with Christ Giving the Keys to St. Peter, 1428–32, Victoria and Albert Museum, London

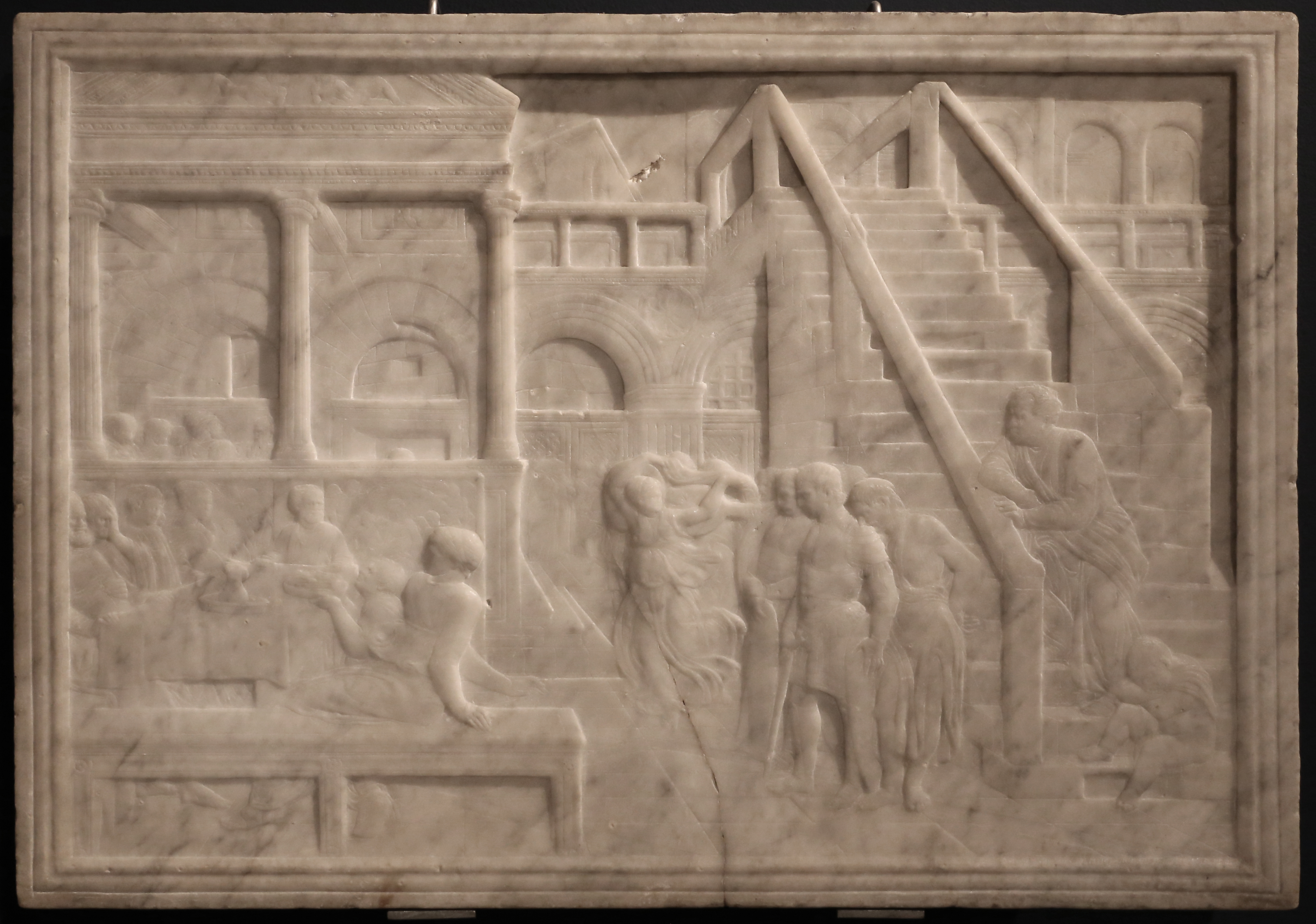
Donatello, The Feast of Herod, ca. 1435, Palais des Beaux-Arts de Lille

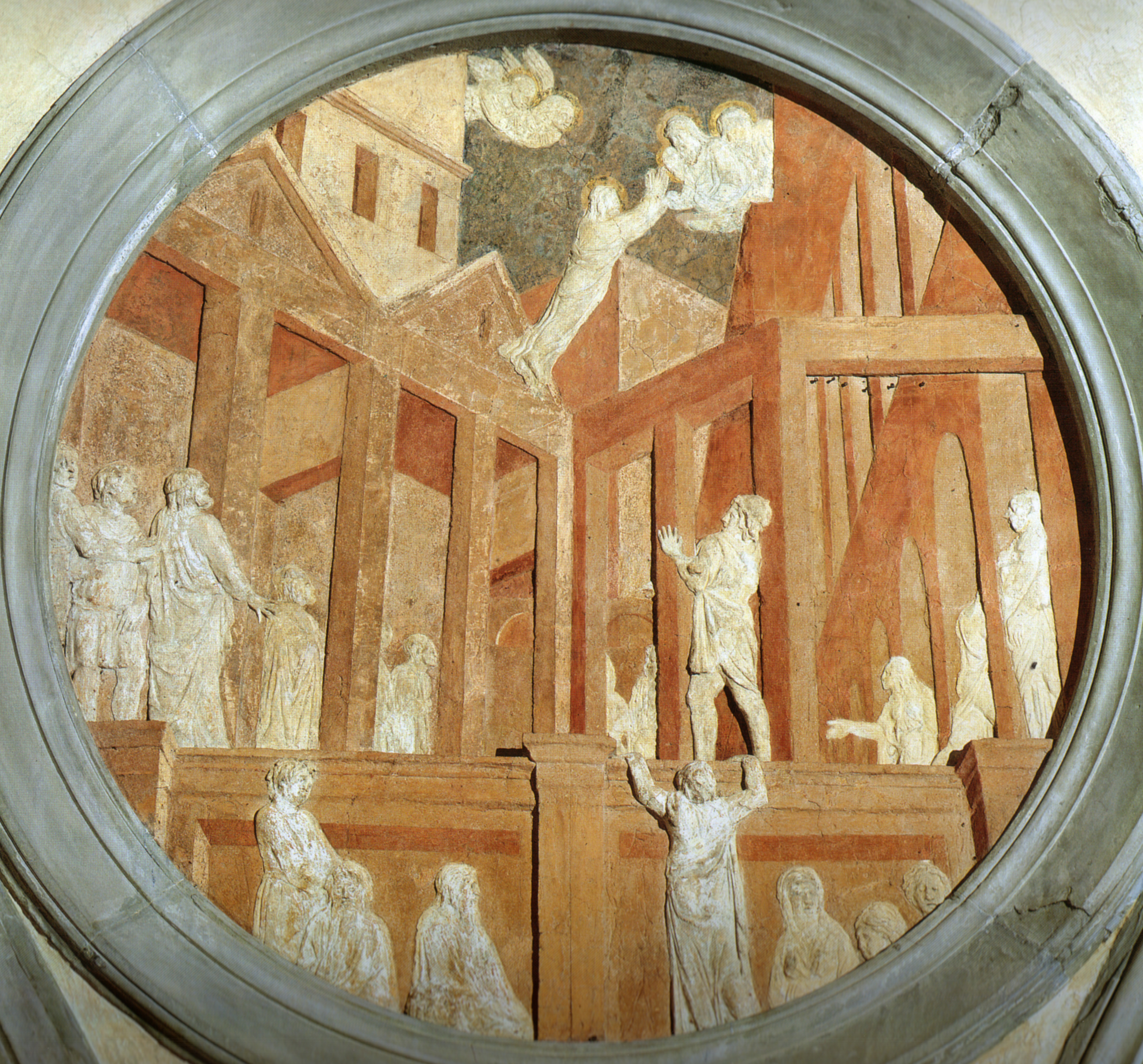
Donatello, The Ascension of Saint John the Evangelist, 1434–43, stucco, Sagrestia Vecchia, San Lorenzo, Florence

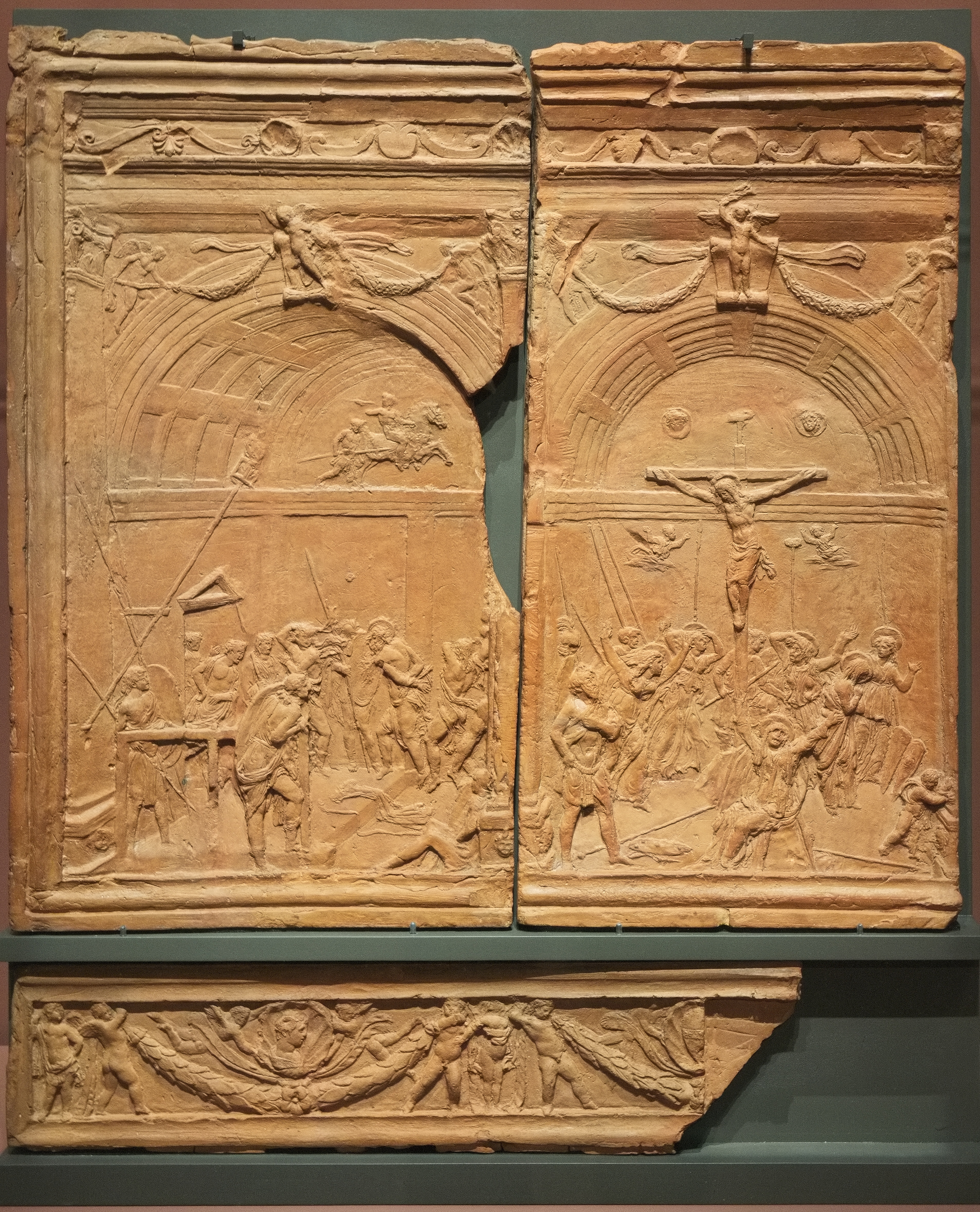
Donatello, Forzori Altar, ca. 1450, terracotta, probably a bozzetto, Victoria and Albert Museum, London

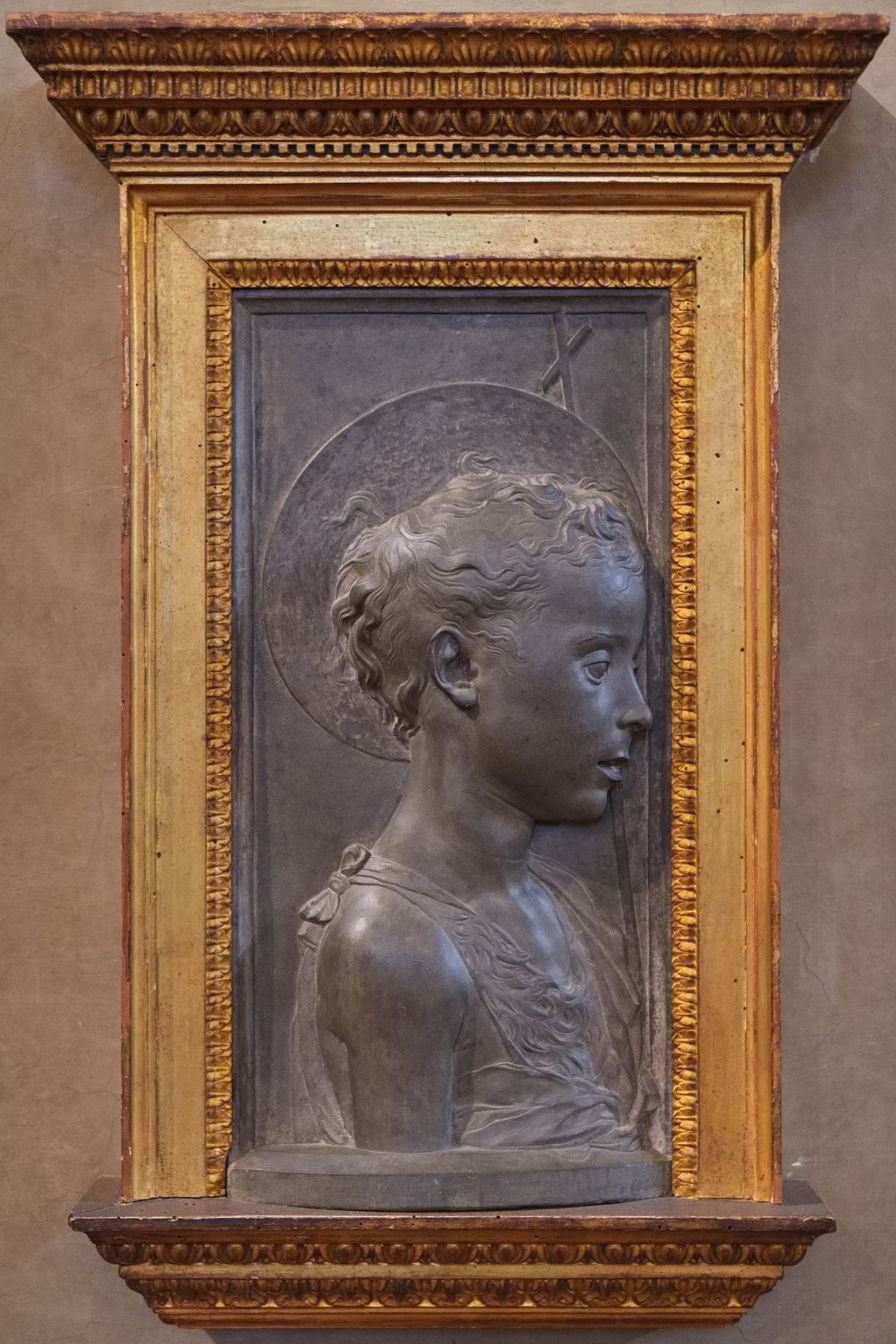
Desiderio da Settignano, San Giovannino, ca. 1450–5, Bargello, Florence

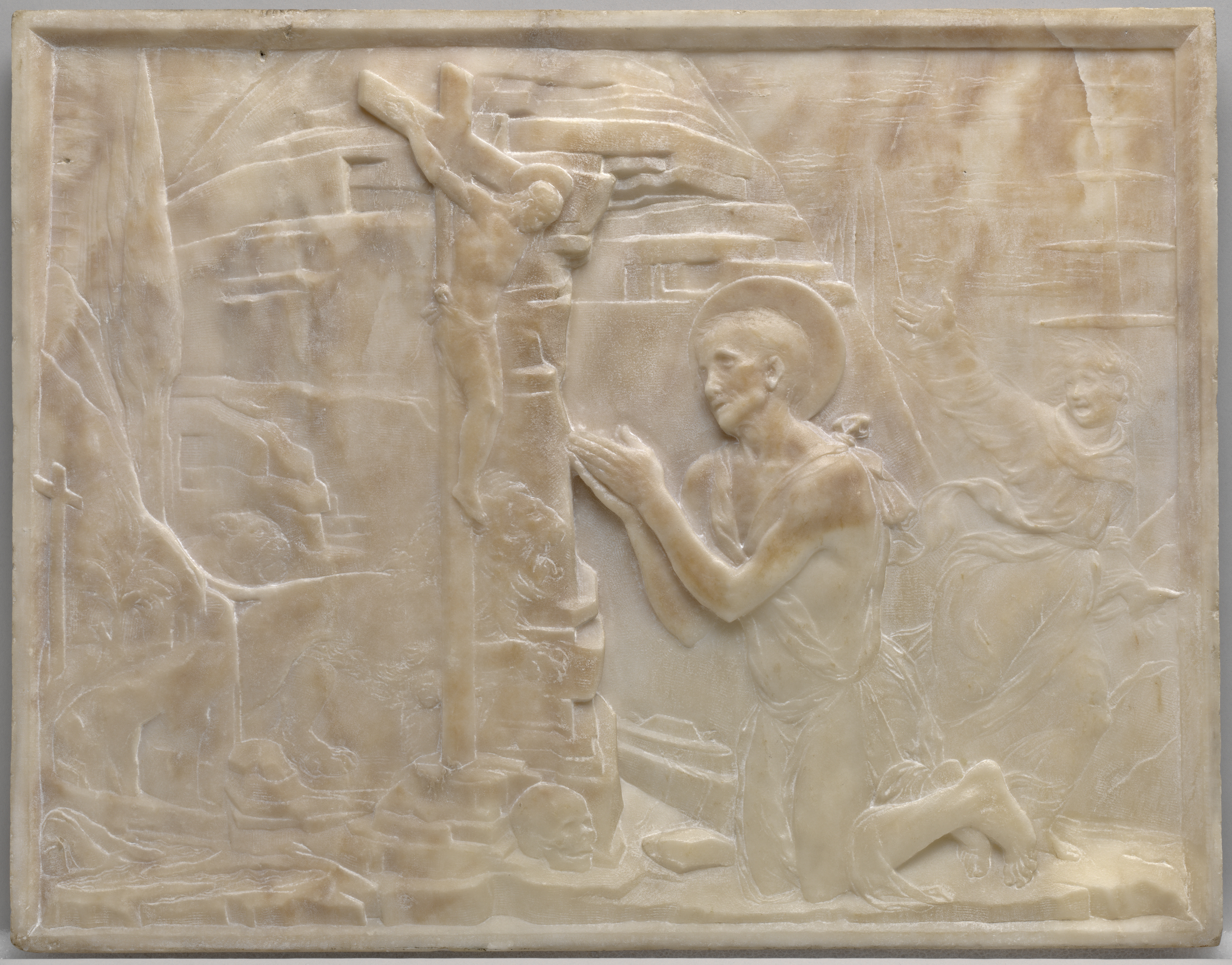
Desiderio da Settignano, Saint Jerome in the Desert, ca. 1461, NGA, Washington

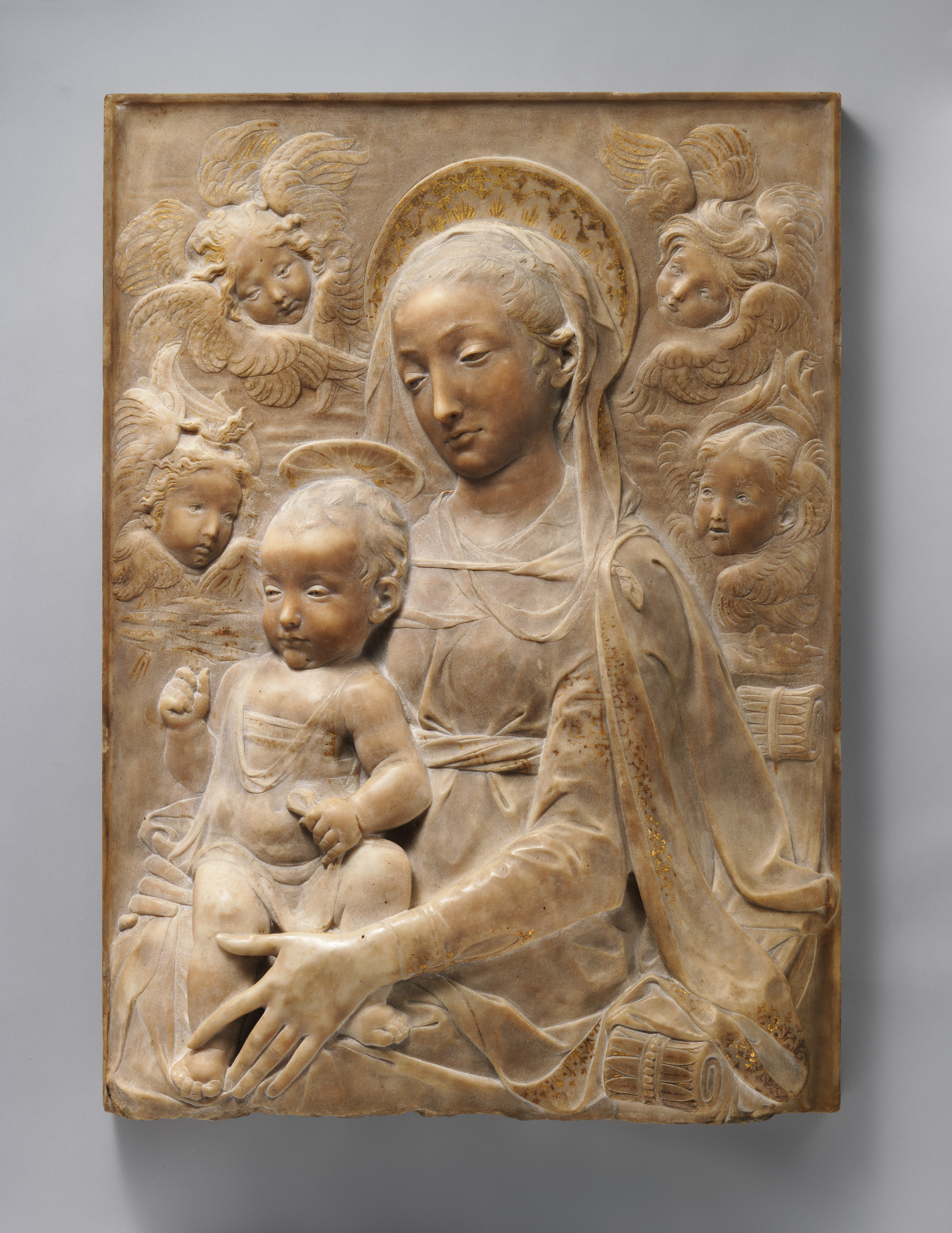
Antonio Rossellino, Madonna and Child with Angels, ca. 1450–65, MET, New York

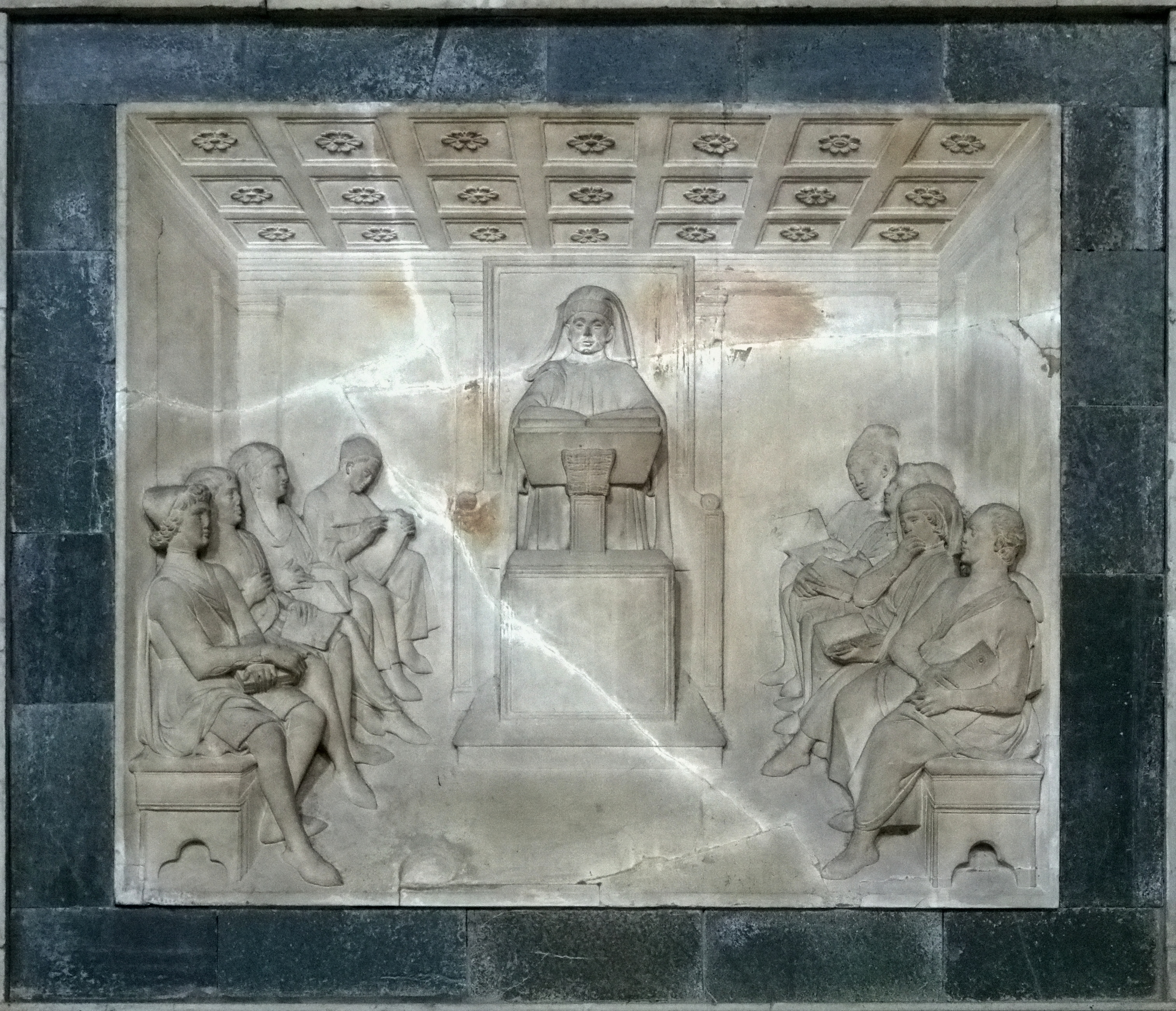
Bernardo and Antonio Rossellino, central relief panel of the Monumental tomb of Filippo Lazzari, 1462, San Domenico, Pistoia

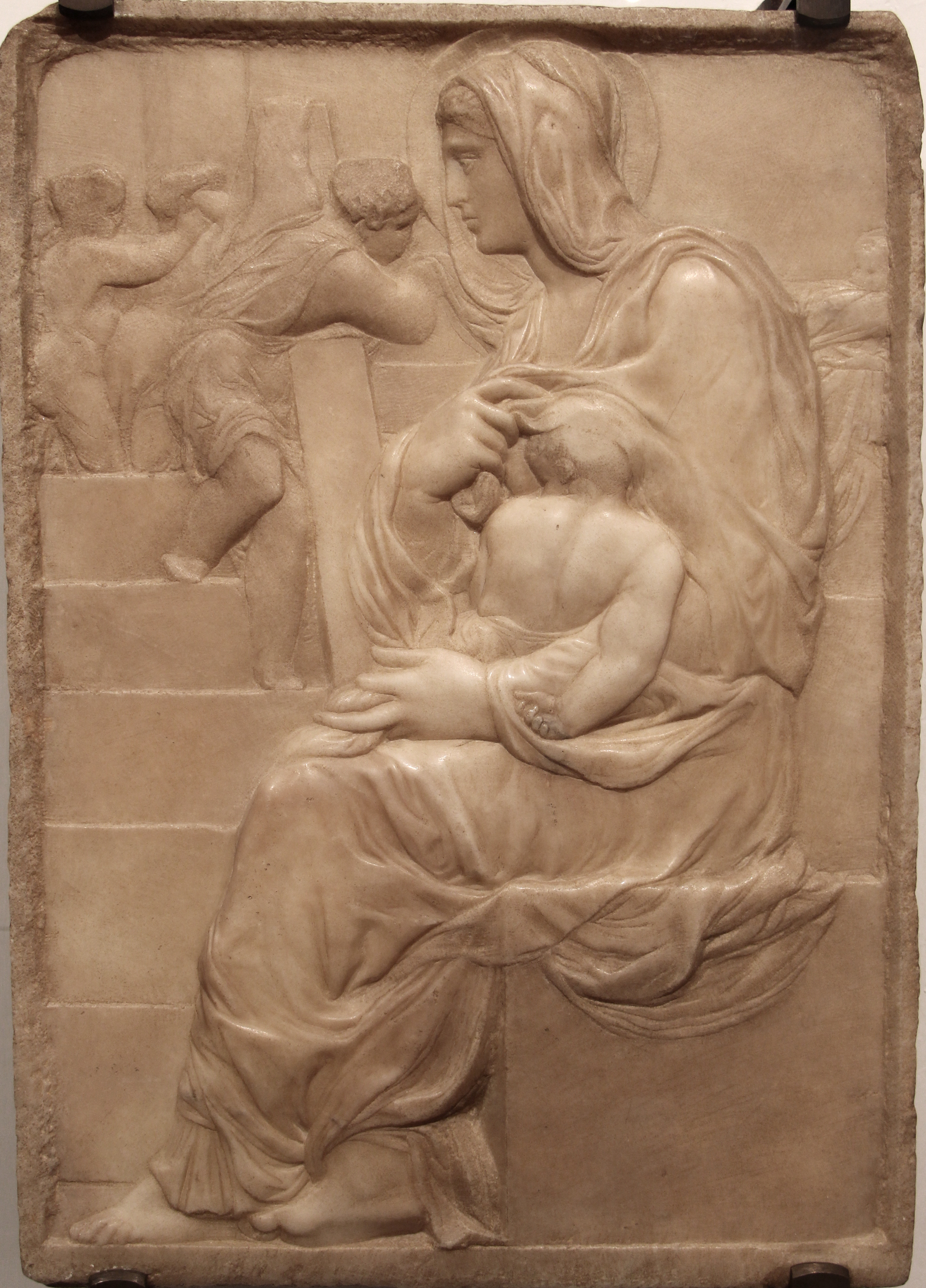
Michelangelo, Madonna della Scala, ca. 1491, Casa Buonarroti, Florence
