= Battistero di San Giovanni =

Battistero di San Giovanni may refer to:

- Battistero di San Giovanni (Florence)
- Battistero di San Giovanni (Pisa)
- Battistero di San Giovanni (Siena)
