= Tomb of Cardinal Rainaldo Brancaccio =

Sculpture by Donatello and Michelozzo

Coordinates: 40.848326°N 14.255575°E

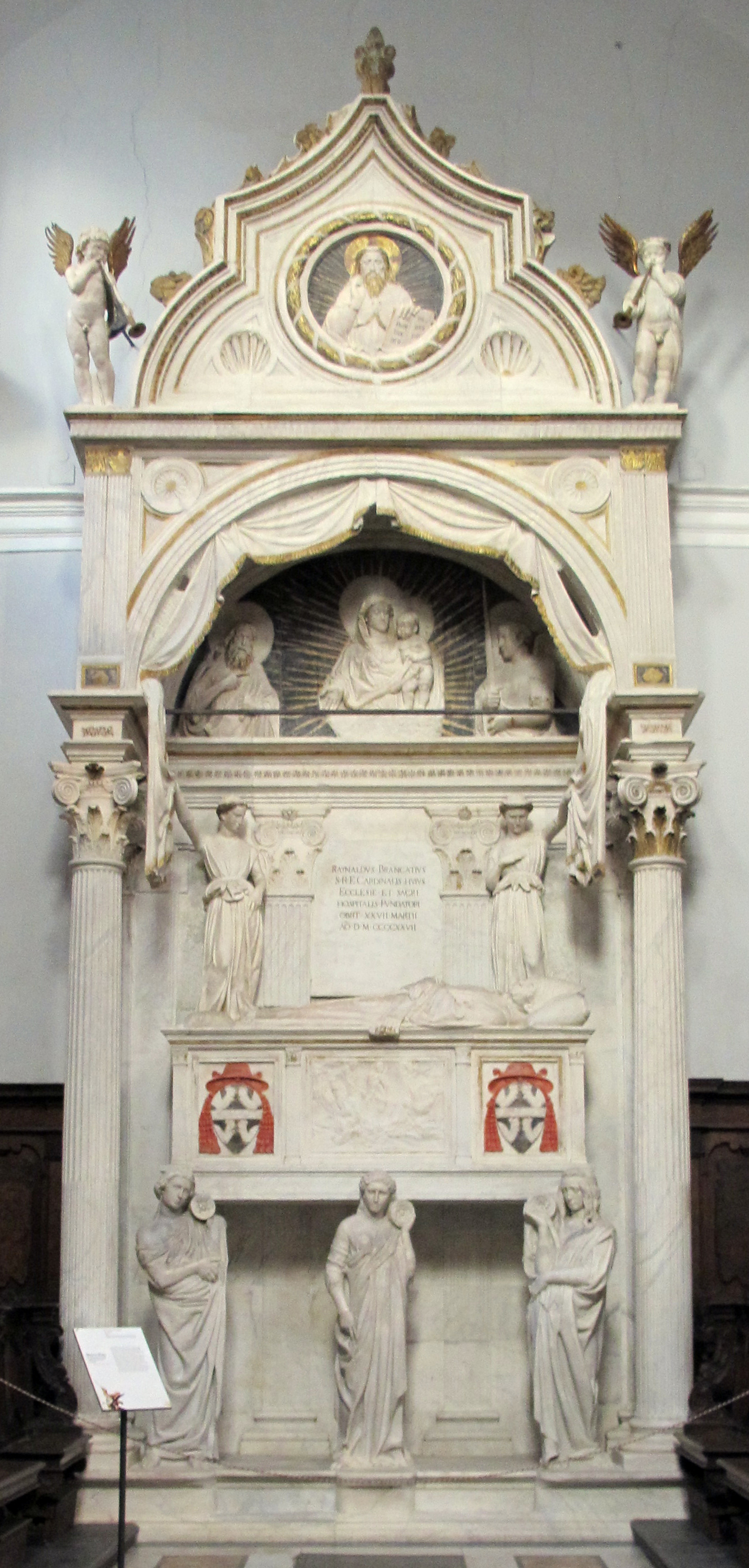
Tomb of Cardinal Brancaccio.

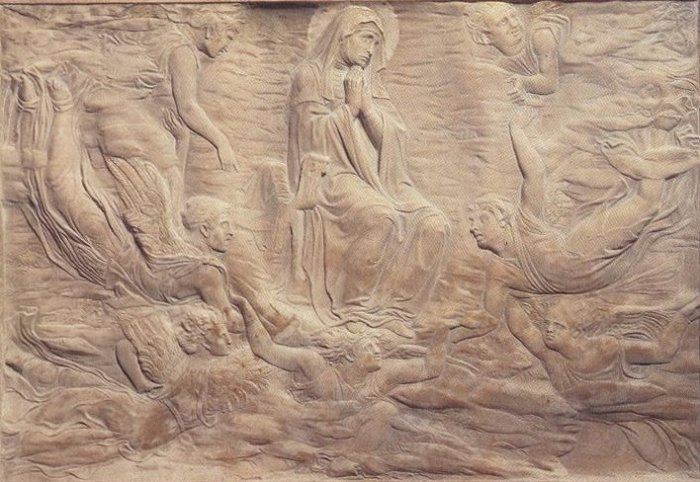
Donatello's relief of the "Assumption of the Virgin".

The tomb of Cardinal Rainaldo Brancaccio is a sculptural work in the church of Sant'Angelo a Nilo in Naples, southern Italy, executed by Donatello and Michelozzo around 1426-1428. Built in marble, partly gilt and polychrome, it has a height of 11.60 meters and a width of 4.60.

== History ==
The work was produced during the partnership of Donatello and Michelozzo, which lasted from 1425 until the late 1430s. It was commissioned when Brancaccio was still alive: a letter to him of 5 June 1427 mentions the work as completed for some one quarter. In 1426 the two rented a workshop in Pisa, from where the pieces of the tomb could be more easily shipped to Naples by sea; the city was also nearer to the marble quarries of Carrara. Assistants, including perhaps Pagno di Lapo Portigiani, collaborated to the work, which was completed and sent to its destination in 1428.

== Description ==
The work is based on a socle from which two composite columns start. They support a round arch with side pendentives decorated by chamfered pilasters and tondo reliefs. At the top is the cusp, in Gothic style with, at the centre, a relief tondo of "Christ Redeemer" and two statues of puttos with trumpets (an allusion to the biblical Apocalypse and the resurrection of the dead).

The tomb itself is enclosed in the architectural frame, supported by three caryatids. The sarcophagus' front has two coat of arms at the sides, and a stiacciato relief of the "Assumption of the Virgin" executed by Donatello. Above it is the lying portrait of the cardinal and two angels who are opening a stone drapery hanging from the arch. Behind them is a lunette with a bas-relief of the "Madonna between Two Saints".

== See also ==
- Tomb of Antipope John XXIII

== Sources ==
- Wirtz, Rolf C. (1998). Donatello. Cologne: Könemann. ISBN 3-8290-4546-8.
