= Saint George Freeing the Princess =

Sculpture by Donatello

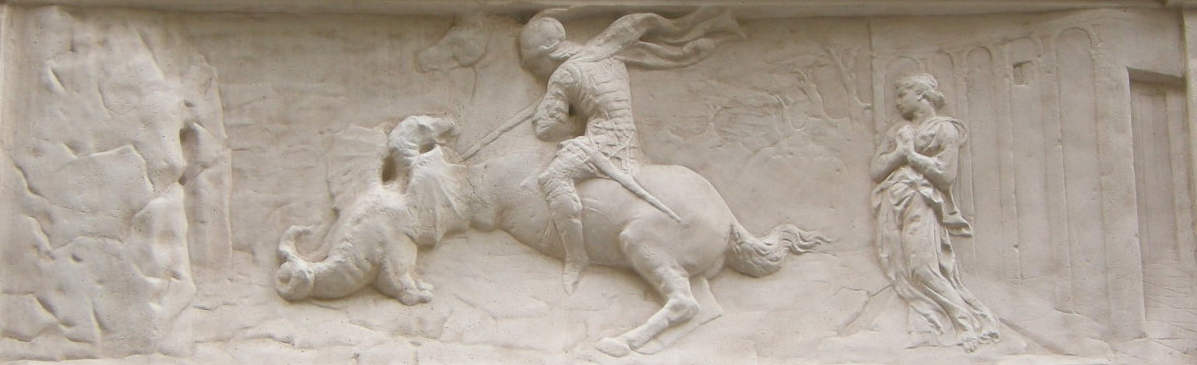
- Artist: Donatello
- Year: 1416–1417
- Medium: Marble
- Dimensions: 39 cm × 120 cm (15 in × 47 in)
- Location: Bargello Museum; Florence

Saint George Freeing the Princess is a marble stiacciato bas-relief sculpture by Donatello, sculpted around 1416 or 1417. It was originally situated under the same artist's Saint George on an external niche of the church of Orsanmichele in Florence; both works are now in the Bargello Museum, with replicas replacing them in their original positions.
