= The Ascension with Christ Giving the Keys to Saint Peter =

Relief by Donatello

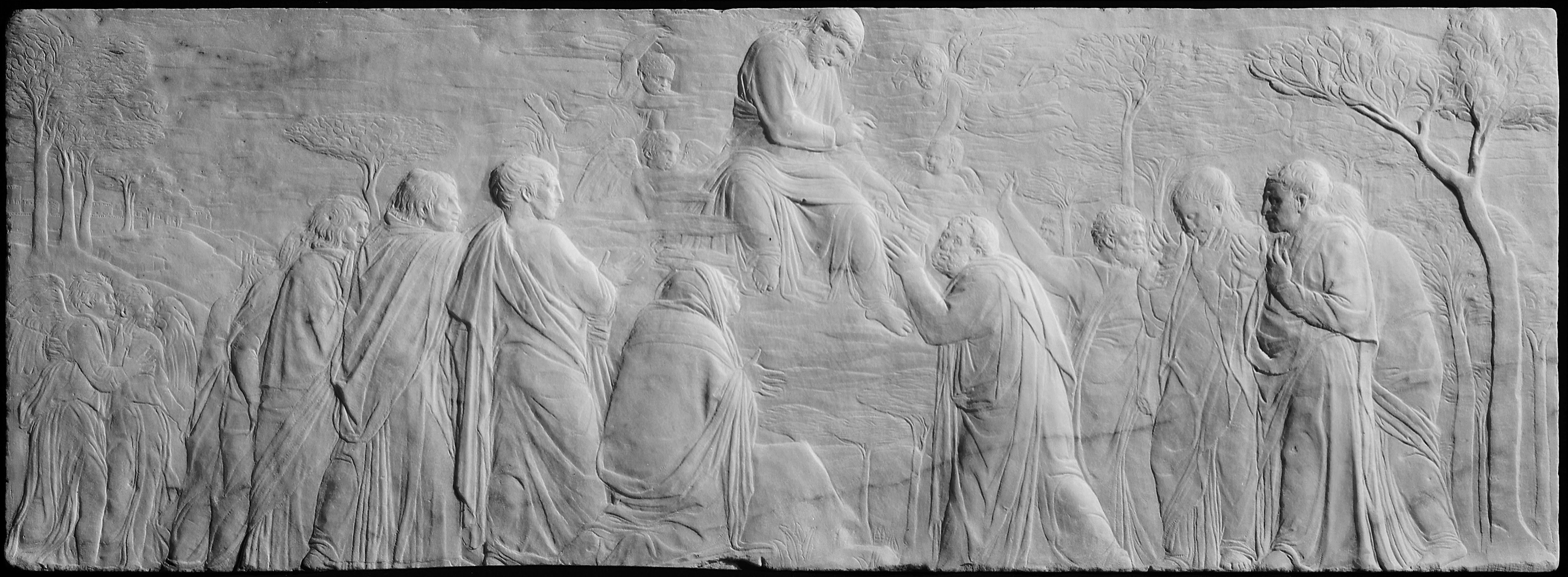
- Artist: Donatello
- Year: c. 1428–1430
- Medium: Marble
- Dimensions: 40.9 cm × 114.1 cm (16.1 in × 44.9 in)
- Location: Victoria and Albert Museum; London
- Accession: 7629-1861

The Ascension with Christ Giving the Keys to Saint Peter is a rectangular stiacciato (schiacciato) marble relief sculpture of c. 1428–1430 by Donatello, now in the Victoria and Albert Museum in London.

Its original commissioner is unknown; it is first recorded in the inventory of the Palazzo Medici in 1492 on the death of Lorenzo the Magnificent, and later in the inventory of the Palazzo Portinari-Salviati in 1591.

It is an unusual subject, combining the Ascension of Christ and Christ's giving the keys of the kingdom to Saint Peter. It may form part of a series of works for private devotion which the artist produced at that time, but more probably it decorated the original altar in the Cappella Brancacci, or perhaps the base of the Saint Peter niche at Orsanmichele.
