= The Feast of Herod (Donatello) =

Sculpture by Donatello

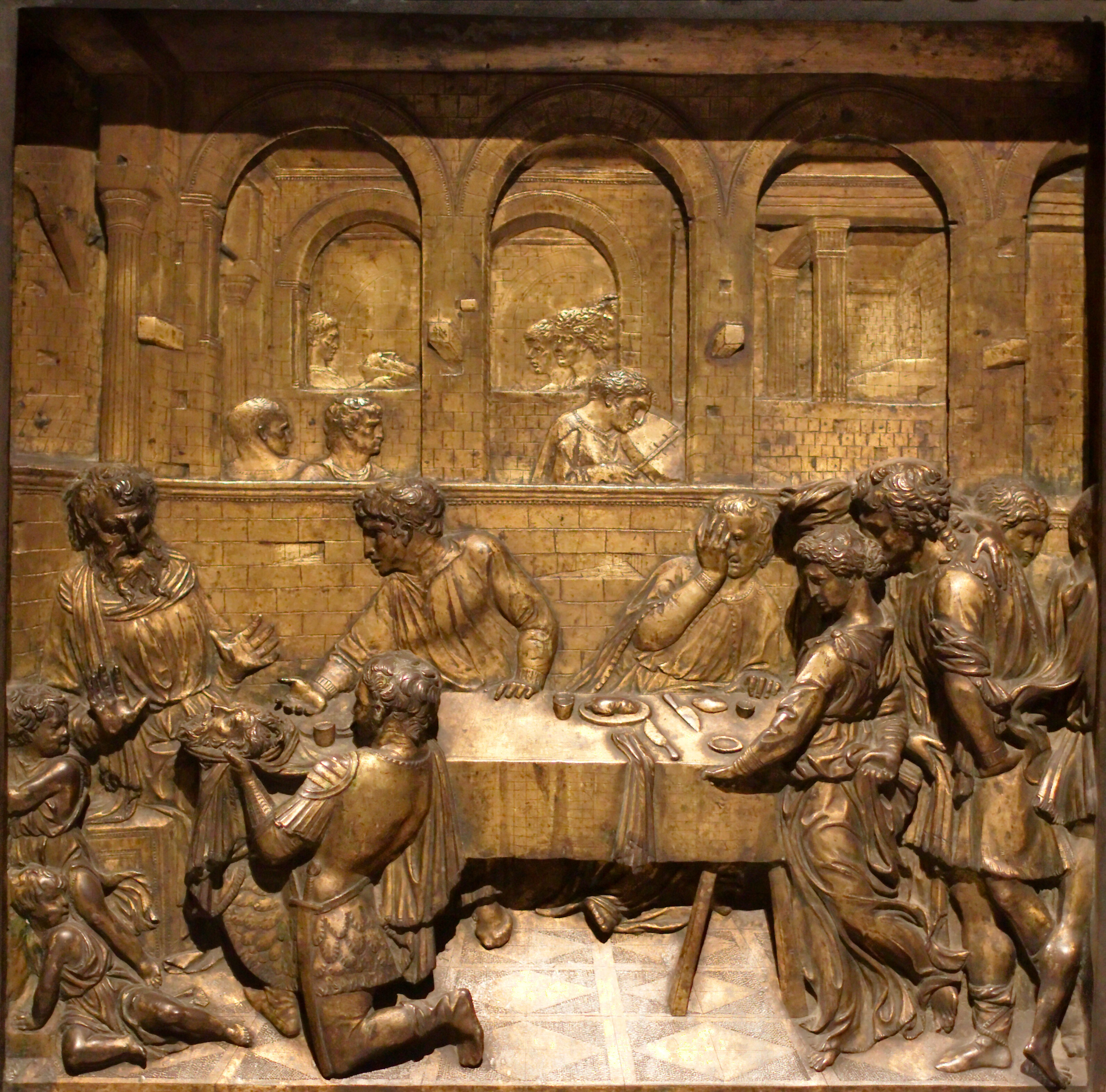
Donatello's Feast of Herod (1423–1427), baptismal font, Battistero di San Giovanni (Siena)

The Feast of Herod is a bronze relief sculpture created by Donatello circa 1427. It was made for the font of the Siena Baptistery of San Giovanni in Italy. It is one of Donatello's earliest relief sculptures, and his first bronze relief. The sculpture is noted for Donatello's use of perspective. The piece is 60 by 61 centimeters.

The sculpture depicts the beheading of John the Baptist after Salome asks Herod Antipas for his head on a platter. The scene depicts an executioner presenting the severed head, and Herod reacting in shock.

== Commission ==
In 1416, Lorenzo Ghiberti was invited by the officials of the Opera del Duomo of Siena to work as an advisor and designer for the commission of a new baptismal font. According to the original plans, the six relief sculptures, which were to adorn the sides of the hexagonal font, were to be completed by Ghiberti and two local Sienese artists. Donatello's commission for the Feast of Herod relief was added to replace one of the reliefs of Jacopo della Quercia, one of the Sienese artists involved in the project, who was not completing his work at the speed the Opera del Duomo desired. The transfer of this commission, and the commencement of Donatello's work on the project, took place in 1423, when an initial advance payment for the relief was made to Donatello. The final payment to Donatello was made in 1427 when the finished relief was collected from Donatello's workshop in Florence and transported to Siena. The original commission specified that the scene to be depicted was the moment "just as the head of St. John was brought to the table of the king", which Donatello expanded into the scene now known as the Feast of Herod.

== Description ==
The scene depicted in Donatello's Feast of Herod combines a few different elements commonly included in the Baptist cycle (the important events in the life of St. John the Baptist). In earlier depictions, such as Andrea Pisano's reliefs on the South Doors of the Florence Baptistery (1330–1336), Salome's dance, the beheading of St. John, and the presentation of the head to King Herod, were separated into different scenes. Donatello brings these elements together, using continuous narrative (a type of narrative art that illustrates multiple scenes of a narrative within a single frame) to illustrate the scene and portray John’s martyrdom without explicitly showing the beheading Another way that Donatello's work differs from previous representations of the scene is the emotional expressiveness of the figures, as Herod and his companions react to the severed head as it is presented.

The addition of architectural elements allowed for the incorporation of linear perspective to the scene, which in turn brings attention to the important focal points and figures. Donatello was inspired by his contemporary Filippo Brunelleschi's exploration into a linear perspective system involving orthogonals (diagonal lines that meet at a central vanishing point) and transversals (the lines crossing these orthogonals) which work together to draw the eye to the vanishing point and create an illusion of space on a two-dimensional surface. Donatello manipulated this system slightly, by having the focal point lead to a "V" of open space, encouraging the eye to move across the panel to the two separate groupings, rather than focusing on any one element. The inclusion of linear perspective would later become a standard element in Renaissance painting and sculpture, after being described by Leon Battista Alberti in his 1435 treatise Della Pictura.

Another way that Donatello described the space in which the scene takes place was through his use of high and low relief. One technique that Donatello implemented in his Feast of Herod is the use of rilievo schiacciato, or shallow relief, which he had earlier used in his St. George predella, for the Church of Orsanmichele in Florence. Donatello used schiacciato carving to create atmospheric effect and to give the impression of greater depth. In order to create this depth, Donatello relied on the contrast between the low and high relief. The inclusion of low relief, in the architecture of the layered arches and in the background figures, allows for specific elements to appear farther away, while the high relief brings attention to the more highly detailed figures in the foreground, which seem to extend out into the viewer's space.

External videos
- Donatello's Feast of Herod, Smarthistory
