= Sant'Angelo a Nilo =

Church of Sant'Angelo a Nilo
- Chiesa di Sant'Angelo a Nilo
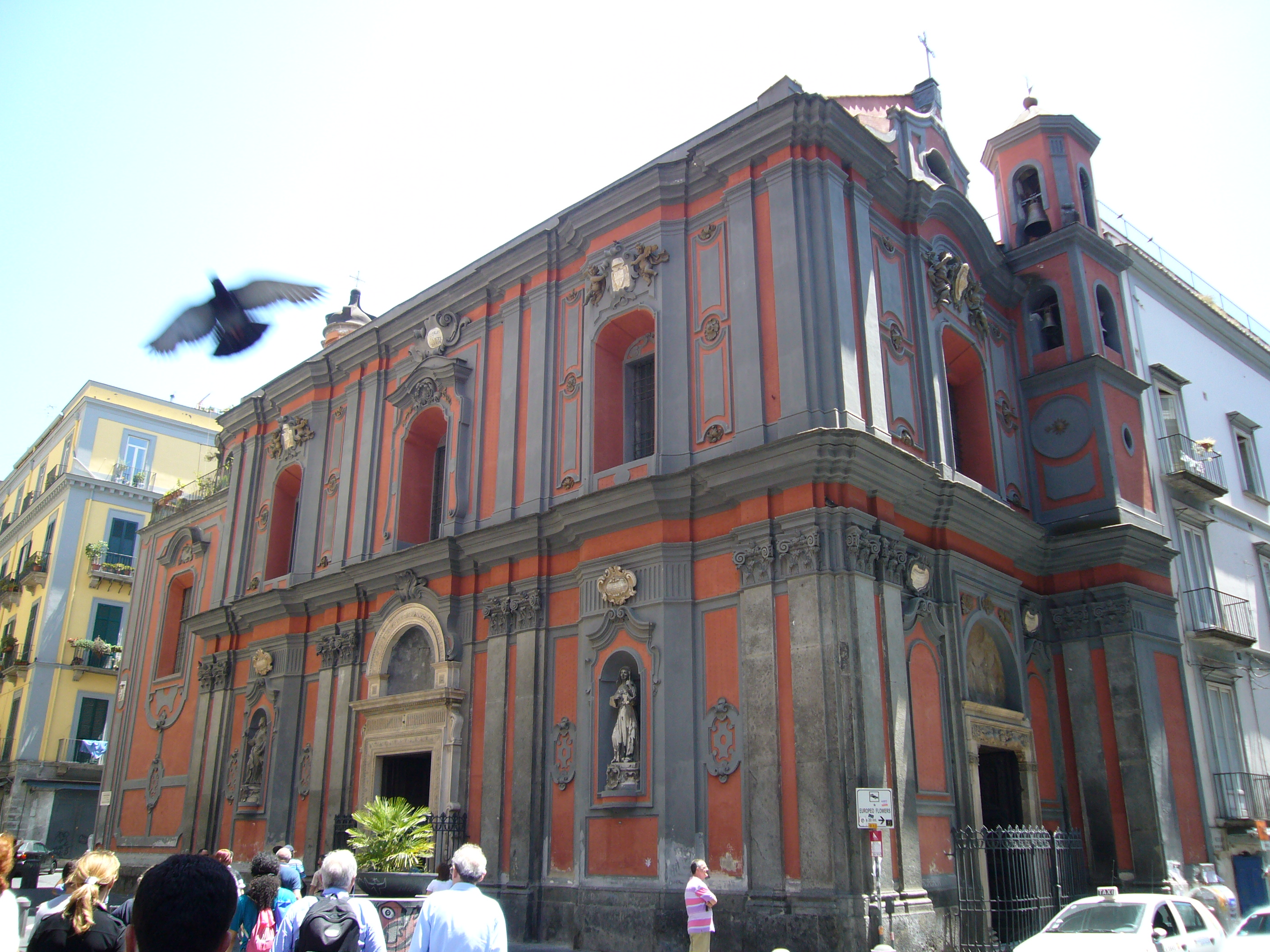
- External view.
- Church of Sant'Angelo a Nilo
- 40.848326°N 14.255575°E
- Location: Via Mezzocannone; Naples; Province of Naples, Campania
- Country: Italy
- Denomination: Roman Catholic

History
- Status: Active

Architecture
- Architectural type: Church
- Style: Baroque architecture
- Completed: 1709

Administration
- Diocese: Roman Catholic Archdiocese of Naples

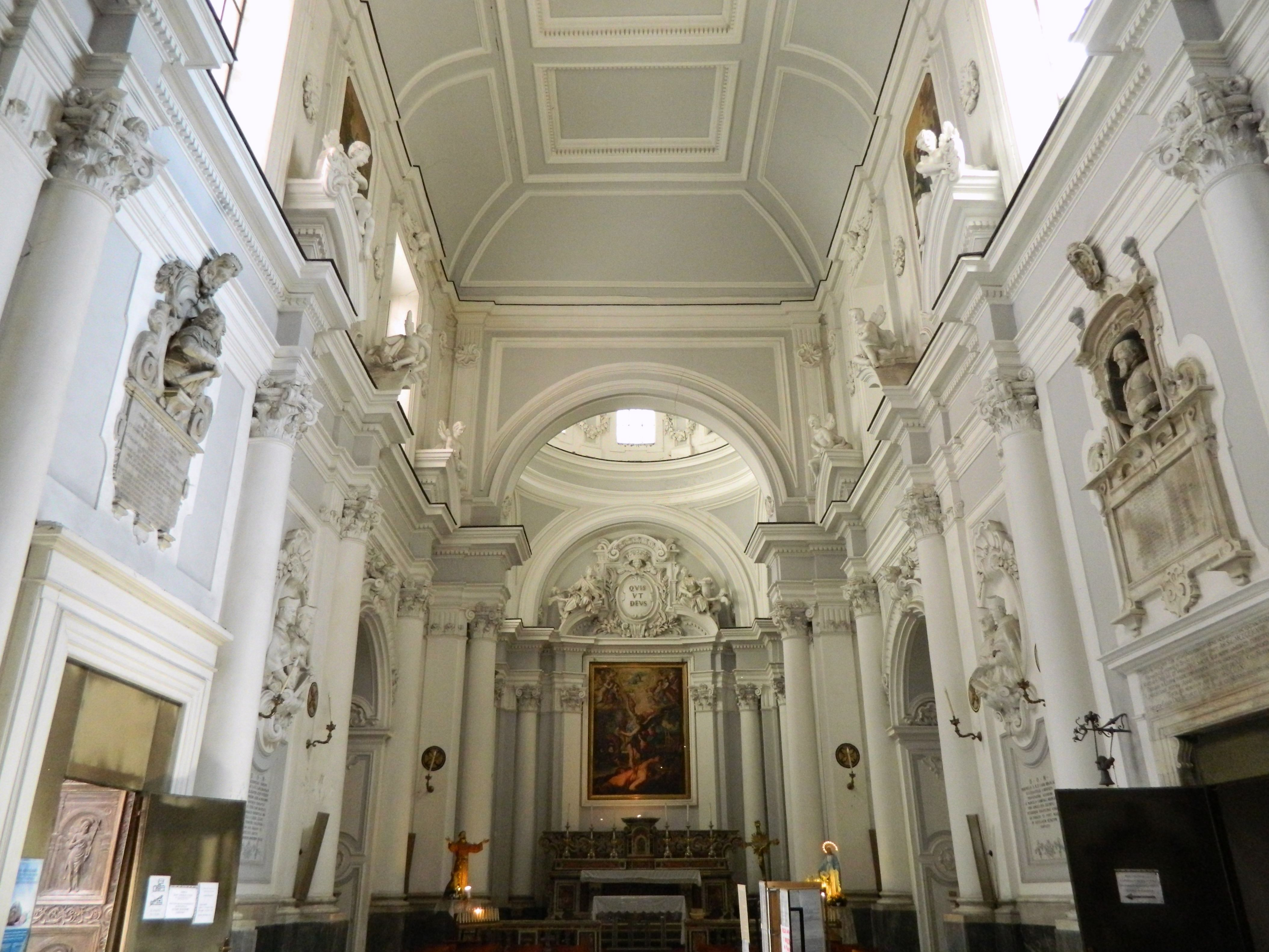
Interior.

Sant'Angelo a Nilo is a Roman Catholic church located on the Decumano Inferiore (Spaccanapoli street) in Naples, Italy. It stands diagonally across from San Domenico Maggiore in Naples. It is known for containing the monumental Renaissance-style tomb of Cardinal Rainaldo Brancacci (Italian: Sepolcro del Cardinale Brancacci) by Donatello and Michelozzo, one of the major sculptural works in the city.

== Description ==
The church is located in the core of the ancient Greek-Roman city: it takes its name from the Egyptian Nile, which was venerated here by the Egyptian merchants. It was begun in 1385 as a chapel, dedicated to Sts. Angel and Mark, by will of cardinal Rainaldo Brancacci, whose family had a palace nearby. The current appearance dates from a 1709 rebuilding, under the direction of Arcangelo Guglielmelli. Remains of the original Catalan-Gothic structure include the main portal, with an architrave featuring angels, and a fresco in the lunette with The Virgin Mary and Saints Michael and Baculus with Cardinal Brancaccio (15th century). A sculpture of St. Michael from another portal has been moved in the interior.

Artworks in the interior include the tomb of cardinal Brancaccio, canvasses from Luca Giordano school, a 16th-century altarpiece by the Sienese painter Marco Pino and a marble tabernacle in the sacristy.

Antonio Valente, the first major keyboard composer of the Neapolitan school, was organist here in 1565–80.

== See also ==
- 18th-century Western domes

== Sources ==
- Regina, Vincenzo (2004). Le chiese di Napoli. Viaggio indimenticabile attraverso la storia artistica, architettonica, letteraria, civile e spirituale della Napoli sacra. Naples: Newton e Compton.
