= Siena Baptistery of San Giovanni =

Religious building in Siena, Italy

Coordinates: 43°19′05″N 11°19′46″E

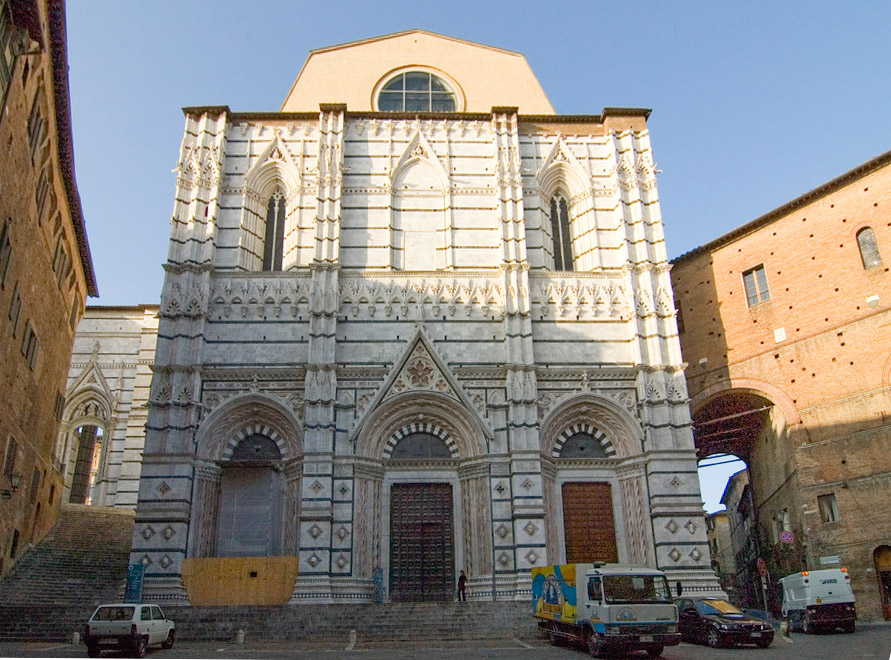
Façade

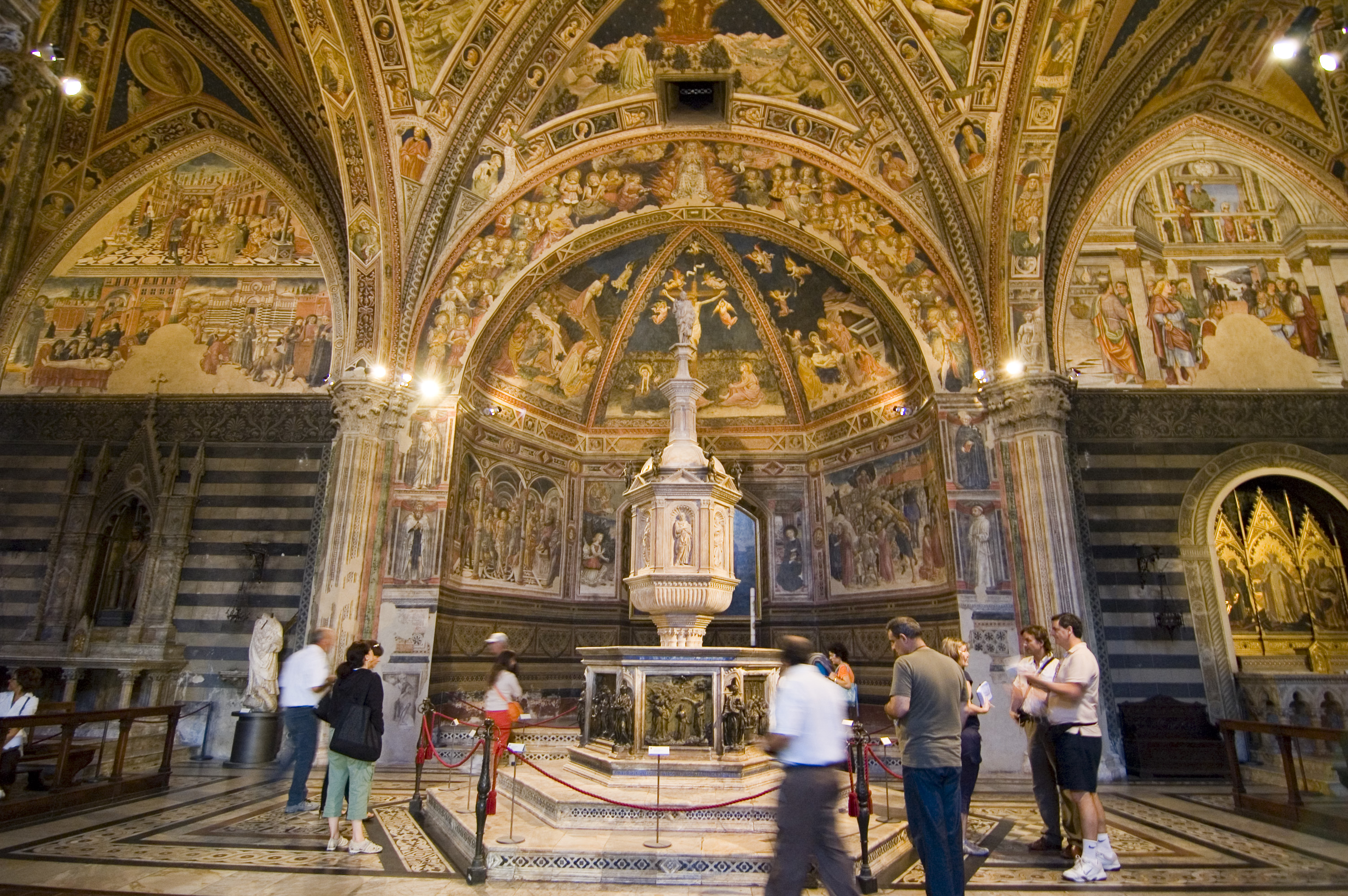
The baptismal font

The Battistero di San Giovanni (Italian: "Baptistry of St. John") is a religious building in Siena, Italy. It is in the square with the same name, near the final spans of the choir of the city's cathedral.

It was built between 1316 and 1325 by Camaino di Crescentino, the father of Tino di Camaino. The façade, in Gothic style, is unfinished in the upper part, such as the apse of the cathedral.

In the interior, the rectangular hall, divided into a nave and two aisles by two columns, contains a hexagonal baptismal font in bronze, marble and vitreous enamel, realized in 1417–1431 by the main sculptors of the time: Donatello (panel of "Herod's Banquet" and statues of the "Faith" and "Hope"), Lorenzo Ghiberti, Giovanni di Turino, Goro di Neroccio and Jacopo della Quercia (statue of John the Baptist and other figures). The panels represent the Life of John the Baptist, and include:

- "Annunciation to Zacharias" by Jacopo della Quercia (1428–1429)
- "Birth of John the Baptist" by Giovanni di Turino (1427)
- "Baptist Preaching" by Giovanni di Turino (1427)
- "Baptism of Christ" by Ghiberti (1427)
- "Arrest of John the Baptist" by Ghiberti and Giuliano di Ser Andrea
- "The Feast of Herod" by Donatello (1427)

These panels are flanked on the corners by six figures, two by Donatello ("Faith" and "Hope") in 1429; three by Giovanni di Turino ("Justice", "Charity" and "Providence", 1431); and the "Fortitude" is by Goro di Ser Neroccio (1431).

The marble shrine on the font was designed by Jacopo della Quercia between 1427 and 1429. The five "Prophets" in the niches and the marble statuette of "John the Baptist" at the top are equally by his hand. Two of the bronze angels are by Donatello, three by Giovanni di Turino (the sixth is by an unknown artist).

The frescoes are by Vecchietta and his school (1447–1450, Articles of Faith, Prophets and Sibyls), Benvenuto di Giovanni, the school of Jacopo della Quercia e, perhaps, one by Piero Orioli. Vecchietta also painted two scenes on the wall of the apse, representing the Flagellation and the Road to Calvary. Michele di Matteo da Bologna painted in 1477 the frescoes on the vault of the apse.
