= Florence Triumphant over Pisa =

16th-century sculpture by Giambologna

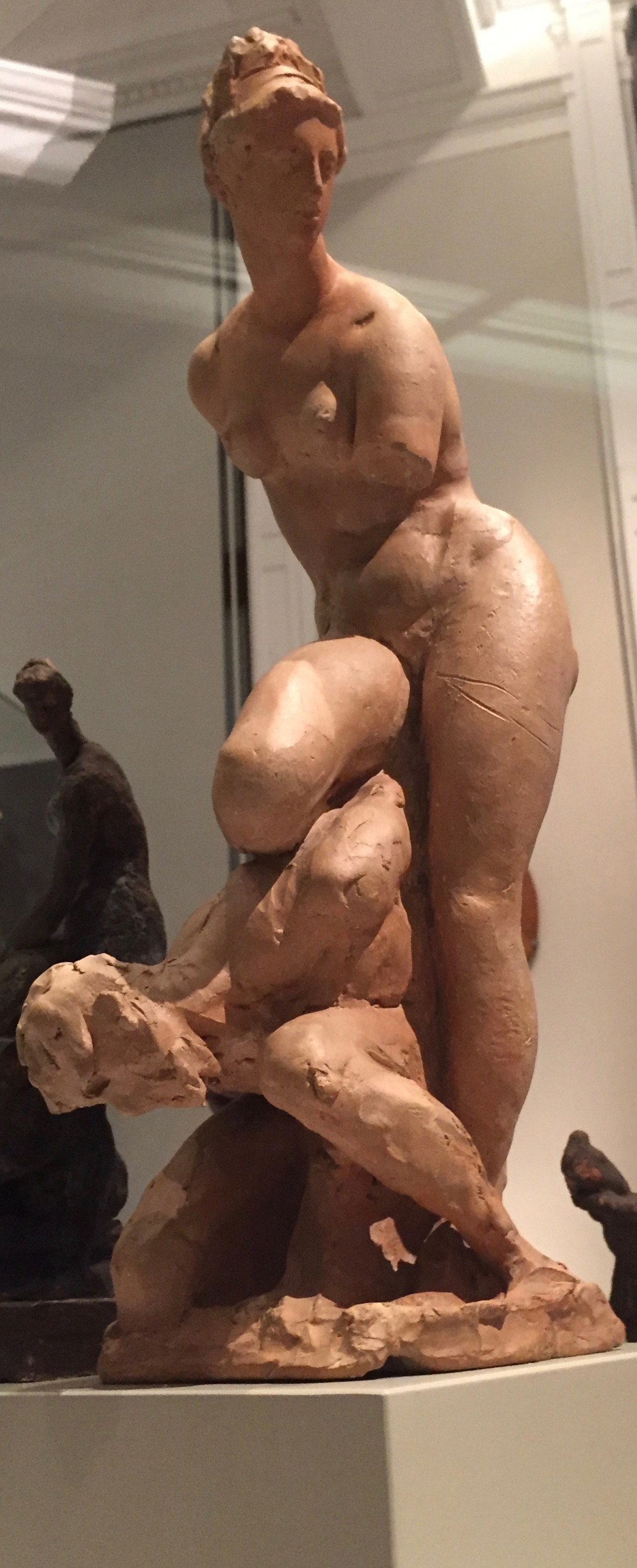
- Florence Triumphant over Pisa, Giambologna (Maquette in clay in the Victoria and Albert Museum)
- Artist: Giambologna
- Year: 1565 and later
- Medium: various
- Location: Museo Nazionale del Bargello, Florence

Florence Triumphant over Pisa is an Italian Renaissance sculpture by Giambologna, existing in two versions, as well as a small wax modello. The first is a full-size modello in gesso (plaster) executed in 1565, still in the Palazzo Vecchio Florence, for which it was created. The Victoria and Albert Museum in London has a small wax study, and a small model in clay.

The marble version was done later, by 1570, perhaps by an assistant, and is now in the Museo Nazionale del Bargello in Florence. This work introduces his interest in "the problem of uniting two figures in an action group", which many later works continue.

Giambologna's entry for the competition in 1560 for the Fountain of Neptune, Florence was not successful, but probably caused the authorities at Bologna to invite him to do their Fountain of Neptune, Bologna. Completed in 1566, this was his first important commission. He was briefly recalled from Bologna in 1565 to make temporary decorations for the wedding of Francesco I de' Medici and Joanna of Austria, including this piece.

But there was a problem getting the marble block in time, and in the end the gesso version was displayed in the Sala del Cinquecento (the Great Council Hall) of the Palazzo Vecchio during the festivities for the wedding of Francesco I de' Medici and Joanna of Austria. Cosimo I de' Medici intended for the Great Council Hall in the Palazzo Vecchio to be decorated with depictions of Florentine military triumphs.

Florence Triumphant over Pisa would be shown with Vasari's painting of scenes portraying Florence's triumph over Pisa.

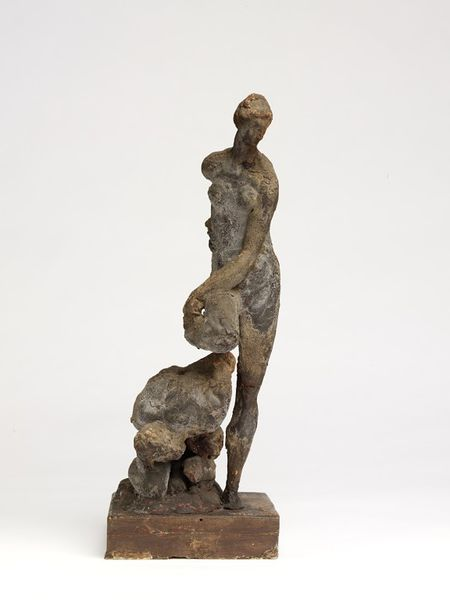
The V&A wax model

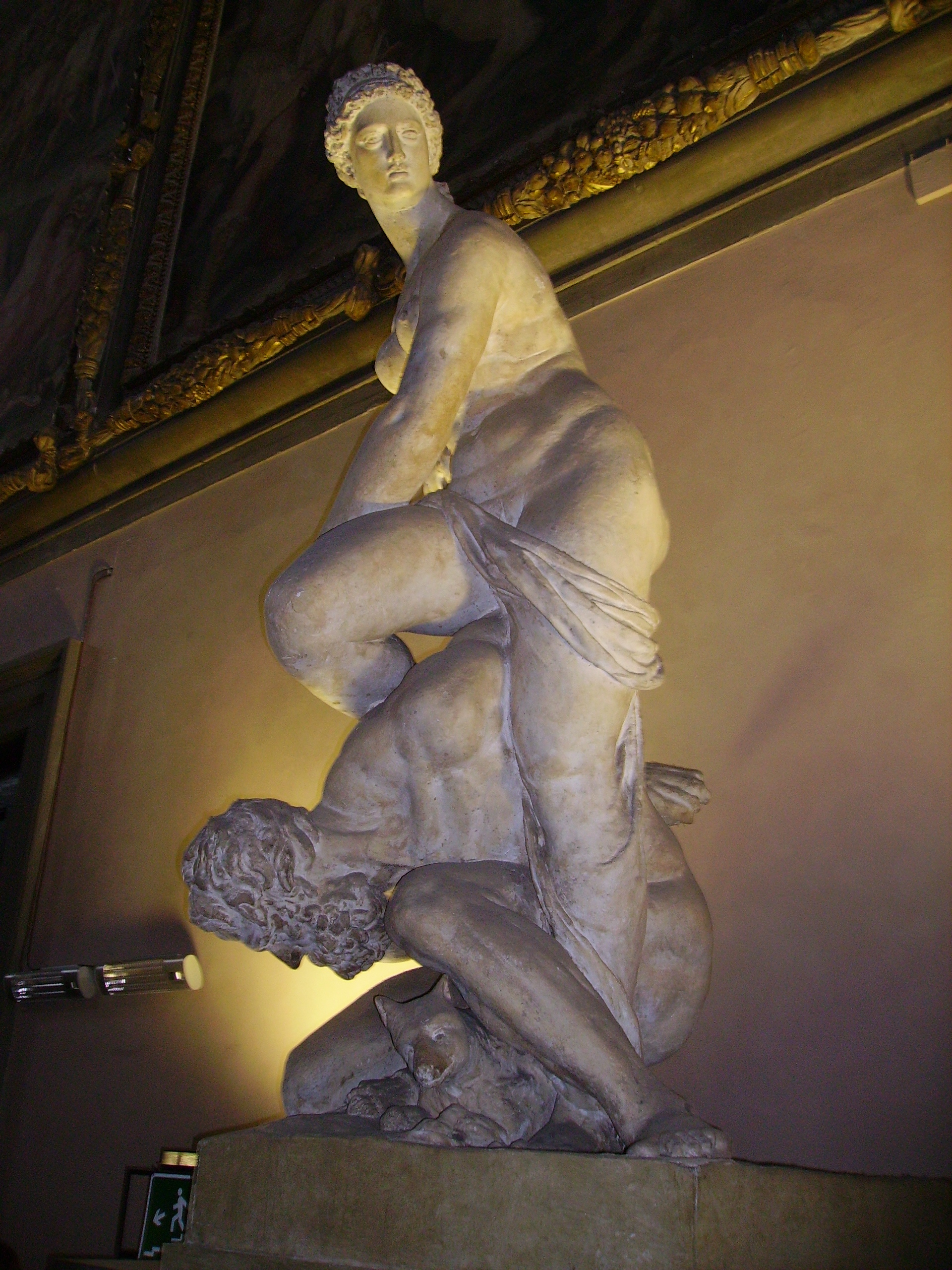
In gesso, Palazzo Vecchio

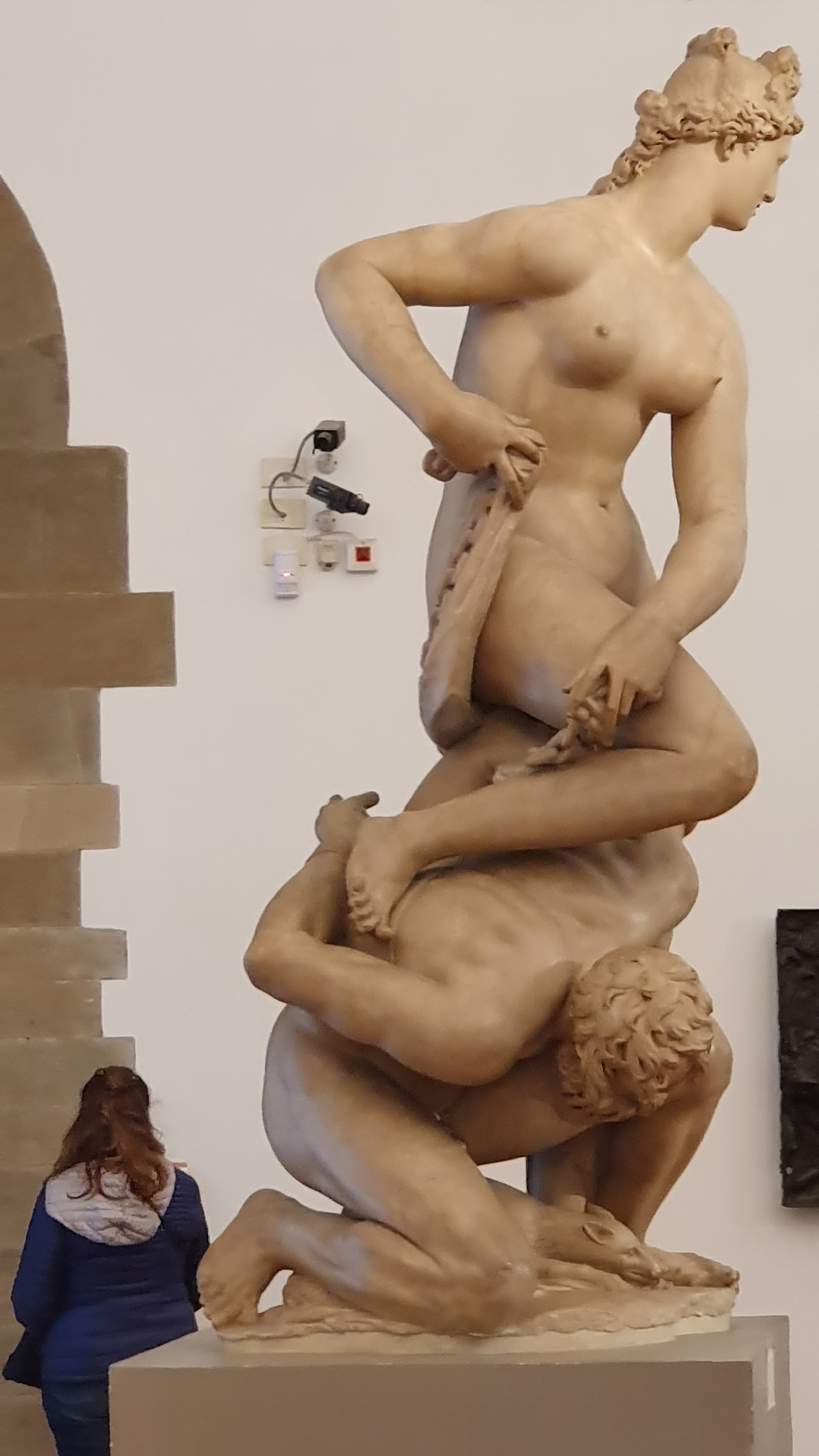
Marble, Bargello
