= Palazzo Ramirez de Montalvo =

Coordinates: 43°46′17.63″N 11°15′32.46″E

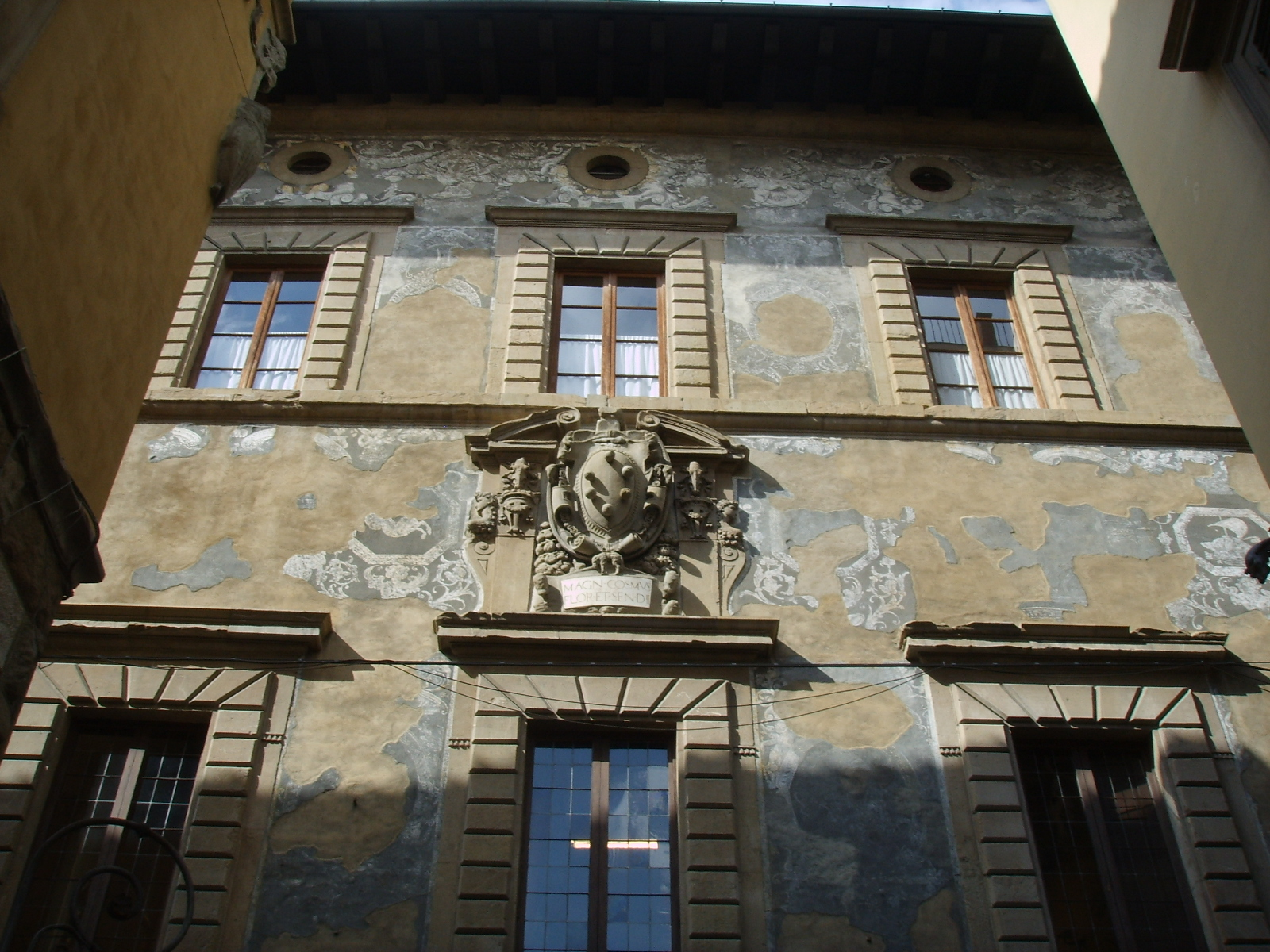
Palazzo Ramirez de Montalvo

The Palazzo Ramirez de Montalvo, also known as Palazzo Matteucci, is a palace located on Borgo degli Albizi #26 in central Florence, region of Tuscany Italy.

The palace was designed by the architect Bartolomeo Ammanati.
