= Palazzo Vecchietti =

Palace in Florence, Italy

Coordinates: 43°46′17.82″N 11°15′10.67″E

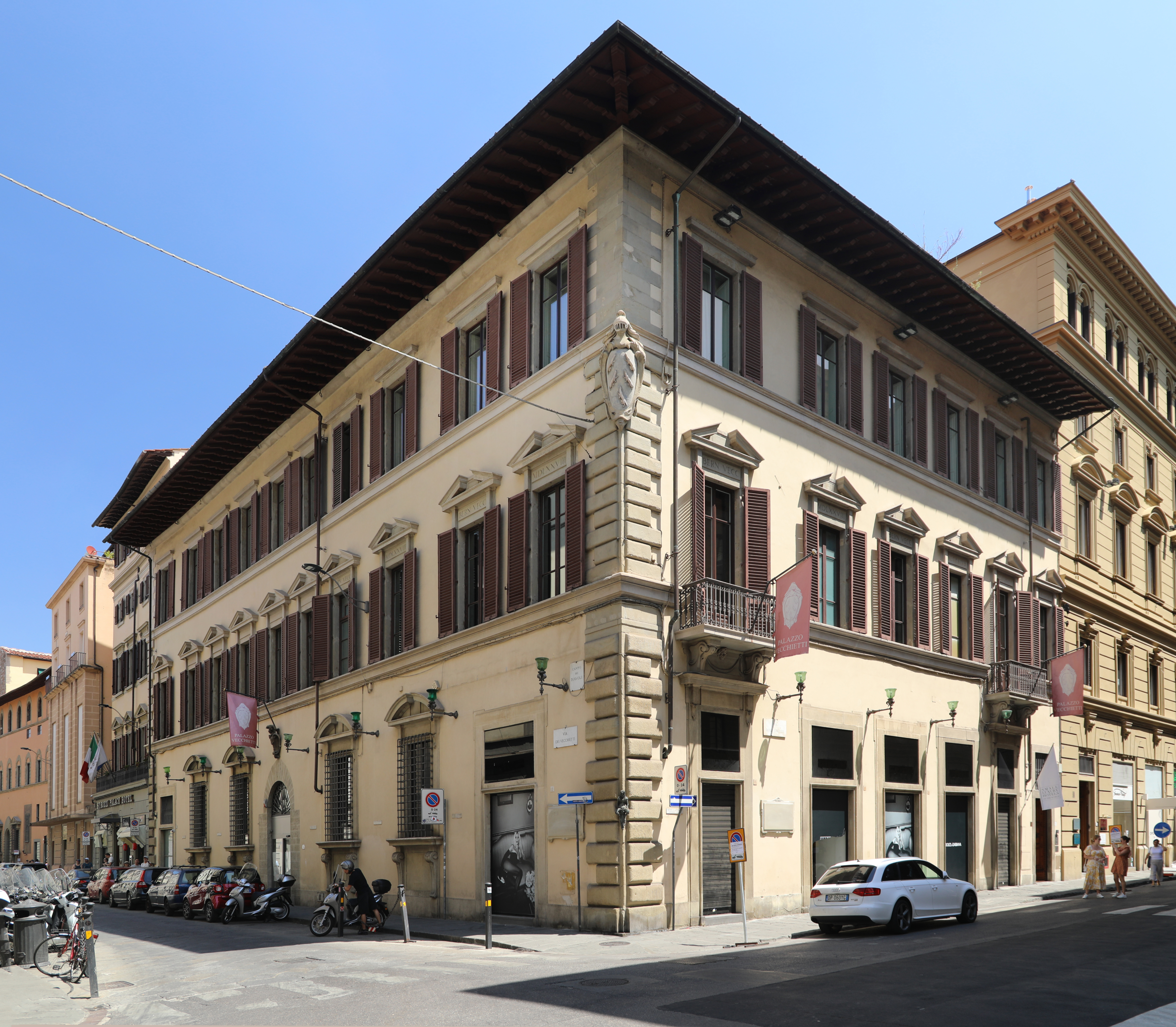
Exterior

The Palazzo Vecchietti is a Renaissance architecture palace located on Via degli Strozzi number 4, near Piazza della Repubblica in the quartieri of Santa Maria Novella, city of Florence, region of Tuscany, Italy.

The palace was designed for the Vechietti family by Giambologna, a mannerist sculptor and architect whom the family had lodged and patronized. All the window pediments on the first two floors are interrupted superiorly. On the South corner with Via Vecchietti a coat of arms of the family, with 5 ermines on a blue background. The family were prominent fur merchants. Below at ground level at the corner is a gargoyle or devil flag-staff. Various traditions are attached to its placement. It appears to mimic the flag carriers of an aristocratic game called the Potenze Festeggiante. The palace ground floor in 2015 has a bank, and upper stories host a boutique hotel.
