= Fountain of Juno =

1563 fountain in Florence

The Fountain of Juno, Juno Fountain (Fontana di Giunone), or Fontana di Sala Grande 'Fountain of the Great Hall' was commissioned by Cosimo I de' Medici in around 1555 for the southern wall of the Sala Grande (now the Salone dei Cinquecento) of the Palazzo Vecchio in Florence. It was completed in 1563, but was never installed. It was created by Bartolomeo Ammannati. It is also called the Fountain for the Hall of the Five Hundred.

It depicts the goddess Juno (Giunone) sitting on a rainbow, flanked by peacocks. Inside the rainbow the goddess Ceres stands on a plinth and the river gods Arno and Parnassus lounge on the sides. The rainbow sits on a lion and a winged horse, and is flanked by personifications of the city of Florence, and of Temperance. It is probably an allegory of Cosimo's construction of new aqueducts for Florence.

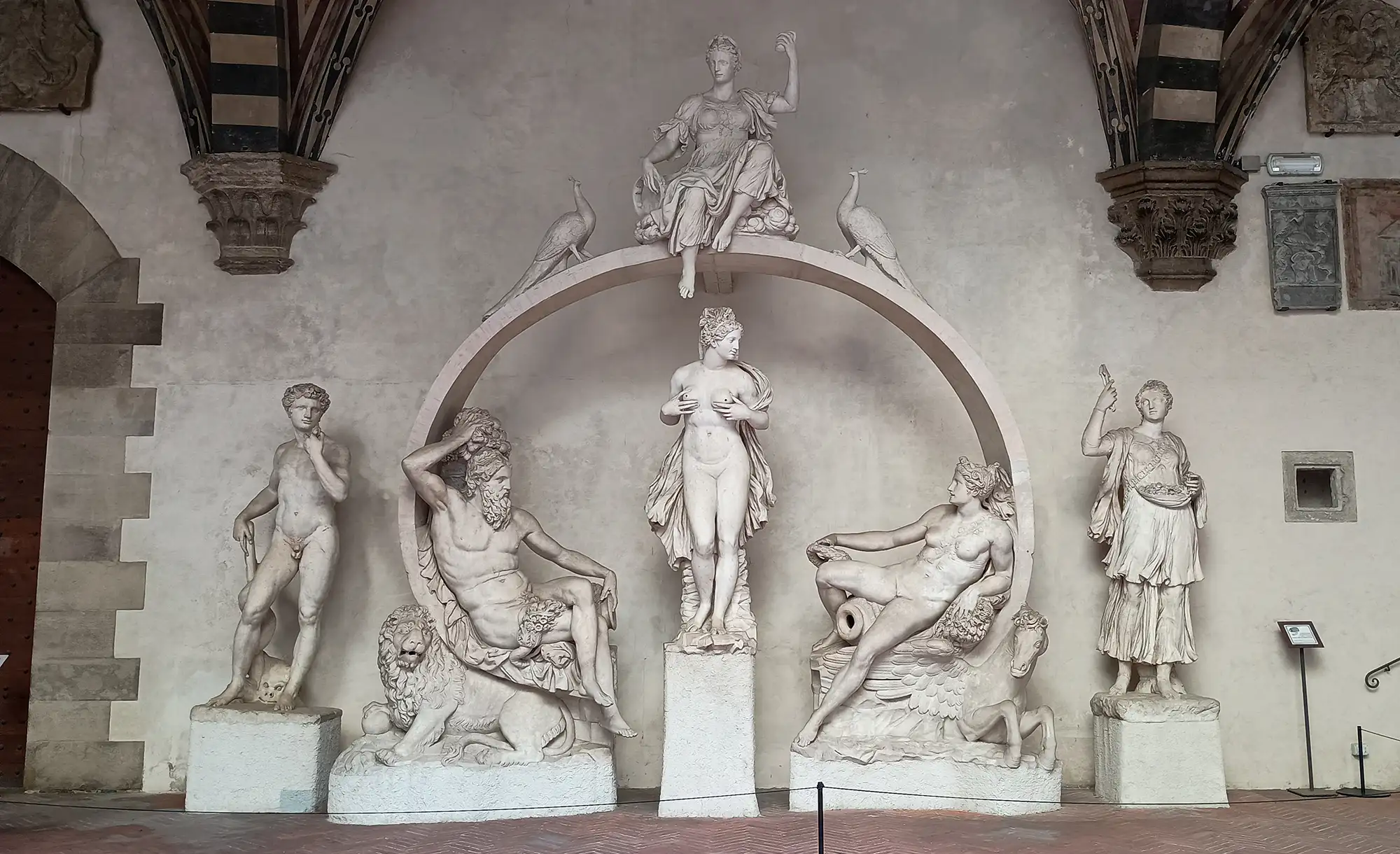
Reconstructed Fountain of Juno in the Bargello

The fountain was stored in the Palazzo Vecchio until 1579, and then the components were scattered in various places around Florence; it has been called a "restless" or "vagrant" artwork. The pieces of the sculpture were partially reassembled at the Bargello museum in 1977 and it was fully recomposed in 2010, with a copy of the statue of Juno and a reconstruction of the rainbow arc.

== Bibliography ==
- Cerri, Giada; Pirazzoli, Giacomo; Verdiani, Giorgio; Tanganelli, Marco; Cardinali, Vieri; Viti, Stefania (2018). "The Bartolomeo Ammannati's Fountain: an artifact in progress". Procedia Structural Integrity. 11: 274–281. doi:10.1016/j.prostr.2018.11.036. hdl:2158/1143491.
