= Laura Battiferri =

Italian poet and writer

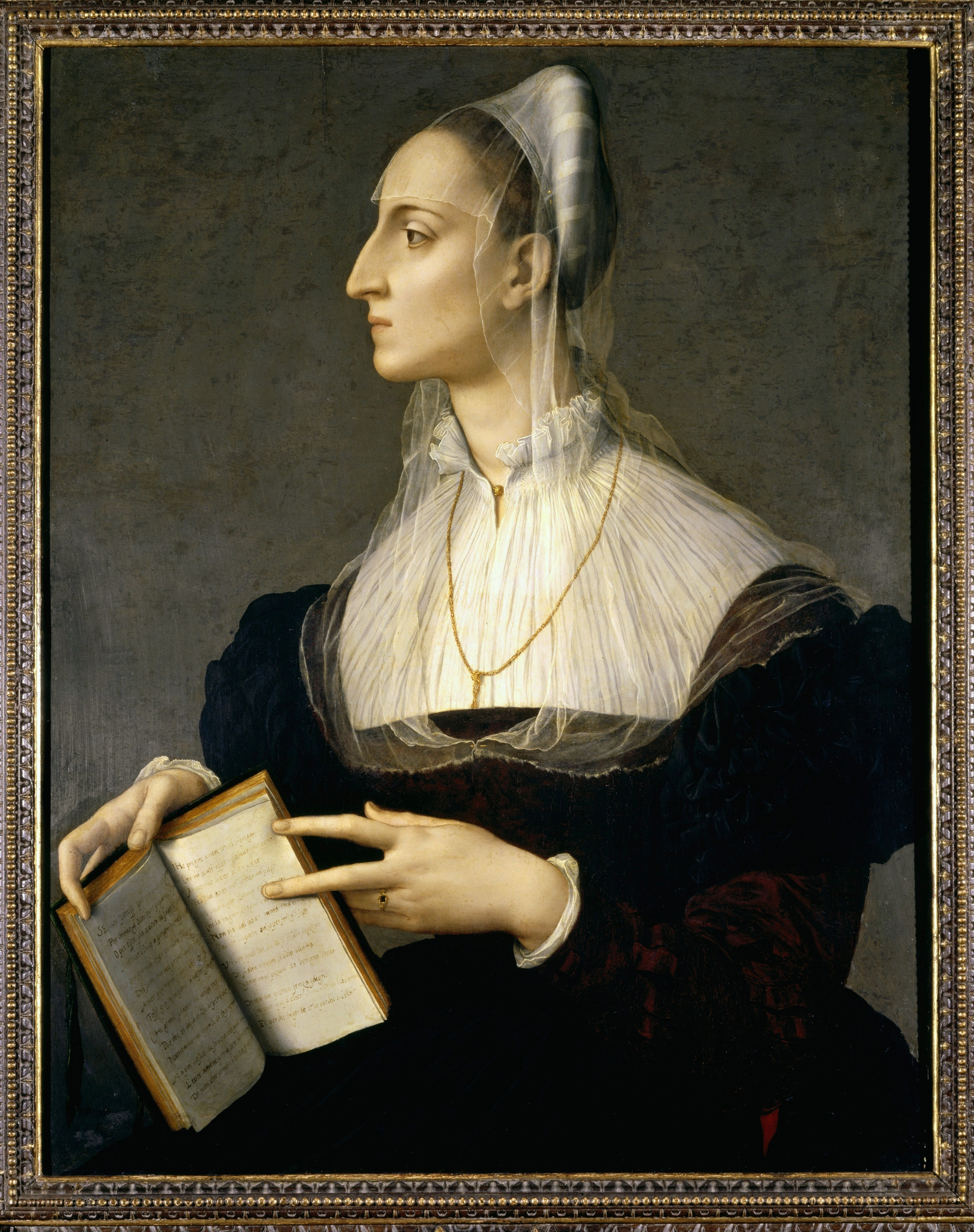
Bronzino, Portrait of Laura Battiferri, c. 1560; Oil on canvas; Palazzo Vecchio, Florence.

Laura Battiferri (1523–1589), also called Laura Battiferri Ammannati, was an Italian poet during the Renaissance period. She was born in Urbino, Marche, Italy as the illegitimate daughter of Giovanni Antonio Battiferri from Urbino and Maddalena Coccapani from Carpi, Emilia-Romagna. She published two books of poetry: The First Book of Tuscan Works (Florence, 1560) and The Seven Penitential Psalms… with some Spiritual Sonnets (Florence, 1564). She died in 1589 while compiling a third, Rime, which was never published. She married the sculptor, Bartolomeo Ammannati in 1550 and they remained married until her death. The couple had no children.

== Early life ==
Laura Battiferri was born in Urbino, Italy. Her father was a wealthy cleric and nobleman of Urbino named Giovanni Antonio Battiferri and her mother was Maddalena Coccapani from Carpi, his concubine. Giovanni enjoyed many privileges due to his status within the inner Vatican circle and as a “familiar” of Pope Paul III. Laura was born into a high social position and cosmopolitan wealth. Her father ensured her education, resulting in her literary familiarity with Latin, love of vernacular classics, and companionship with the Bible. Despite her illegitimate birth, Giovanni recognized Laura as his daughter and had her and two of his other children legitimized by Pope Paul III on 9 February 1543, and eventually she would become his rightful heir. As she became an adult, she was well versed in literature, philosophy, and religion.

== Marriages ==
Laura's first husband was Vittorio Sereni, a court organist. After about five years of marriage, he died in 1549. Laura was devastated. Sonnet 240 from The First Book of Tuscan Works expressed her grief. (Translated from Italian to English):

As the sun disappears and the shadows
descend from the mountain top
and human cares drop away, one by one,
leaving hearts tranquil,
death and cruel fate fill me with anguish,
rest refuses to come to my tired heart,
and I pass my hours and nights crying
with tears in my heart as well as my eyes.

Alas when I see the cornucopia filled
with fruit and flowers, when I see the faithful friends
Flora and Ceres, the one carrying roses at her breast,
the other, mature wheat,
and the peasant boy coming from the fields
carrying the rewards of his hard work
I say with tearful eyes: are loss and mourning now
to be forever the fruit of my hopes?

As a result, she moved to a Battiferri family home in Rome. While living in Rome, she met her second husband, Bartolomeo Ammannati (1511-1592), a sculptor from Florence, through mutual connections in Vatican circles. Although it is suspected that her father assisted in their meeting. On 17 April 1550 she remarried, at age 26, to Bartolomeo Ammannati at the Casa Santa in Loreto. She brought an unusually large dowry to the marriage, 2,000 scudi, about 10 times that of a typical bride of the time. However, Laura's dowry was probably never been paid in full and remained listed as an “unsettled matter” at the death of Laura's father.

== Adult life ==
Laura and Bartolomeo spent the early years of their marriage in Rome. Laura loved living in Rome, and expressed these feelings in her ode (translated from Italian to English):

Lofty, sacred hills,
flowering and gentle,
under whose great and glorious empire
your sons embraced the whole world,
may our skies be eternally clear
and may you be ever free from heat and frost;
and you, lovely, flowing, silvery river,
you make Rome even more beautiful;
may your sun be never so strong
as to dry your green tresses.
Let the woeful day never come
that I must leave your warm shelter.

In the early 1550s, Laura's husband, Bartolomeo was commissioned for architectural works by Pope Julius III in Rome, which he achieved with the help of Michelangelo and Giorgio Vasari. In 1555, Pope Julius III died and Bartolomeo stopped receiving commissions. Meanwhile, Giorgio Vasari had established himself among a group of illustrious artists in Florence and he invited Bartolomeo to join him, having found him a new patron in the area. Bartolomeo and Laura decided to move from Rome to Bartolomeo's villa in Maiano, on the outskirts of Florence. Laura dreaded the move, as Rome was near and dear to her. She loved the city for sentimental reasons, but also because her career was just taking off. She believed that the metropolis of Rome was the “hub of the world” and the best place for her budding poetry career to blossom. She considered Florence to be uncivilized, unenlightened, and “blind wilderness”. She wrote about her unfortunate departure from Rome and her wish for her name and reputation to live on in this poem (translated from Italian to English):

Here am I, belonging to you, inviolate, noble ruins,
yes, here my very self— oh cruel destiny—
about to leave you; alas, will my deep sadness ever come to an end?

And you, wandering spirits,
to whom heaven gave such great gifts
as to win you the bliss
of eternal citizenship above.

Let my humble prayer be heard in heaven:
though I am far away, living in horrible darkness
and buried alive on the Arno,

Make my name, that best part of me
that stays here on the Tiber, purged of all dross,
remain alive among your precious treasures.

Though the villa in Maiano was surrounded by beautiful natural landscapes, she still felt homesick for Rome. Eventually, she found her place in Florence, becoming widely popular for her talent and morality and publishing many of her works. In fact, whenever members of the Florentine artistic community came together for a large public event such as wedding, birth, battle victory, or funeral, Laura participated by contributing occasional poetry, almost always as the sole woman. Furthermore, Laura was known to be devoutly religious. She received a large inheritance in 1565 and she and Bartolomeo began to give large contributions to support the Jesuits' activities. From about 1570 to the end of their lives, Laura and Bartolomeo developed extremely close relations with the Jesuits.

== Career ==
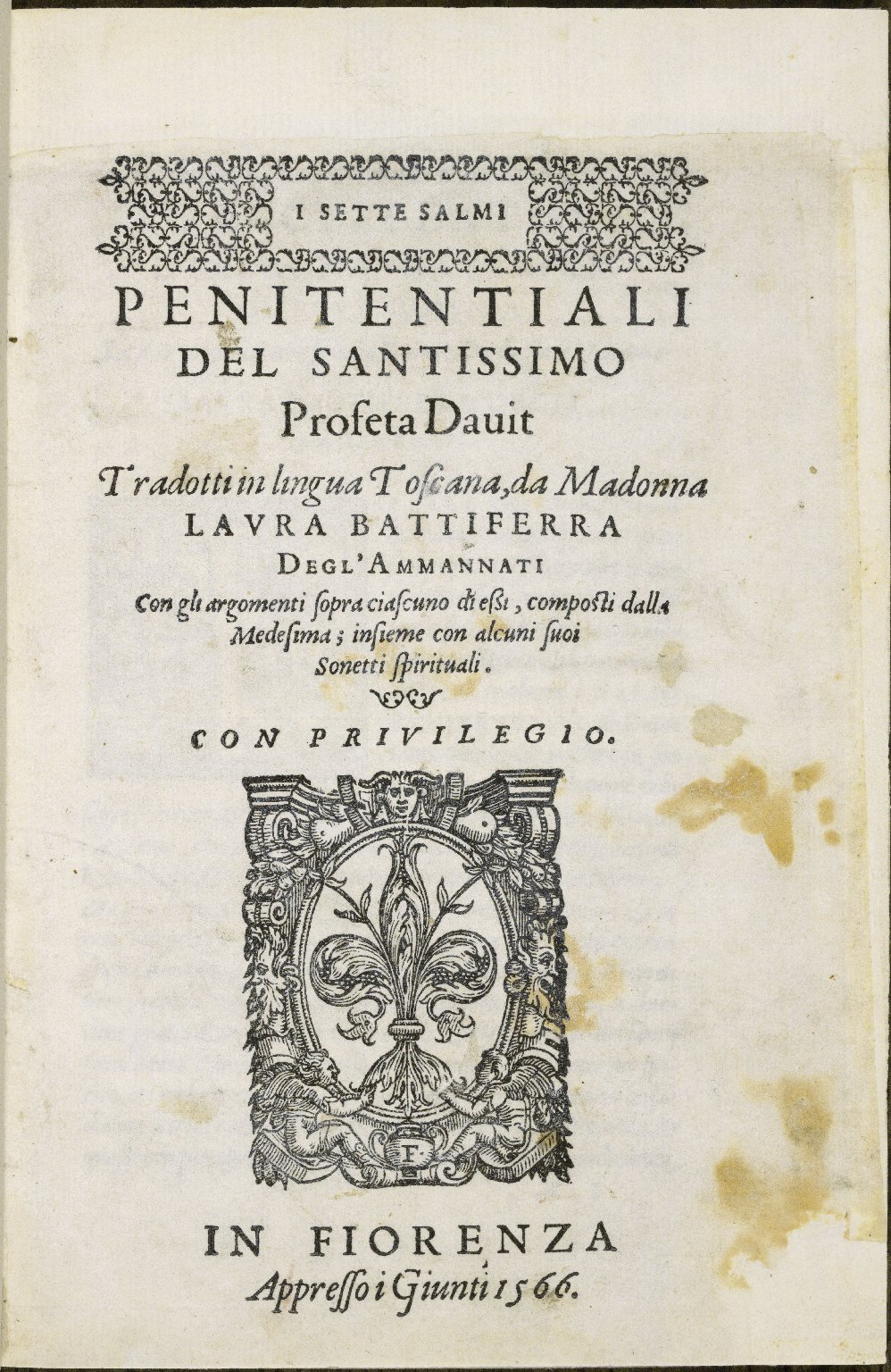
The title page of a 1566 edition of Battiferri's translation of the Psalms into Italian.

=== Early-mid career ===
During her lifetime, Laura was celebrated for her talent and character by her male peers and embraced in their literary communities. By 1560, Laura had assembled almost 200 poems and published her first book of poetry, The First Book of Tuscan Works, dedicated to the Medici duchess, Eleonora de Toledo. The book was an anthology classified by Petrarchan sonnets. It won praise from poets across Italy. She was sought after for membership in several Italian academies, a remarkable feat for a woman at the time. In 1560, she accepted entry into the most prestigious of the academies, “the Intronati,” becoming the first woman ever admitted to an Italian academy. Each member of the Intronati adopted a humorous, antiphrastic pseudonym, Laura's being “la Sgraziata” or “the Graceless,” a characteristic contrary to her critiques. She published her second book, The Seven Penitential Psalms… with some Spiritual Sonnets in 1564 and dedicated it to the duchess of Urbino. In it, she proved successful as a biblical translator and exegete, both being skills typically for men. Her prefatory letter to the duchess of Urbino signaled a step up in her career from secular to sacred literature. By 1565, she was at the height of her fame.

=== Later career ===
In her younger years, Laura aggressively sought recognition for her art, and actively forwarded her career but in her later life she withdrew from the public eye. She spent most of her days meditating, praying, or composing unprinted spiritual poetry in the private chapel that Bartolomeo had built for her at their villa in Camerata. While in the process of compiling the third and final anthology of poetry, her Rime, Laura died in 1589. Her husband attempted to have it completed, but Bartolomeo also died before the process was completed. Laura and Bartolomeo were both buried at the Church of San Giovannino At least one-third of her entire written works were never published. Her late productions—hundreds of spiritual sonnets, biblical narrative poems, and her incomplete epic on the Hebrew kings—was entrusted to the Biblioteca Casanatense in Rome and nearly none of it ever came to light.

== Sources ==
- Arriaga Flórez, Mercedes, Cerrato, Daniele, Laura Battiferri entre reinas, amigas y poetas, Dykinson, Madrid, 2020.
- Ammannati, Laura Battiferri Degli, and Victoria Kirkham. Laura Battiferra and Her Literary Circle: An Anthology. Chicago: U of Chicago, 2006. Web.
- Benson, Pamela, and Victoria Kirkham. Strong Voices, Weak History: Early Women Writers & Canons in England, France & Italy. Ann Arbor: U of Michigan, 2005. Print.
- Jaffe, Irma B. Shining Eyes, Cruel Fortune : The Lives and Loves of Italian Renaissance Women Poets. New York: Fordham UP, 2002. Print.
- Kirkham, Victoria. "Creative Partners: The Marriage of Laura Battiferra and Bartolomeo Ammannati." Renaissance Quarterly 55.2 (2002): 498–558.JSTOR.org. The University of Chicago Press, Summer 2002. Web. Oct. 2014.
- Stortoni, Laura Anna, and Mary Prentice Lillie, eds. Women Poets of the Italian Renaissance: Courtly Ladies and Courtesans. New York: Italica Press, 1997. Print.
