= Fountain of Neptune, Florence =

Fountain in Florence, Italy

Coordinates: 43°46′10.48″N 11°15′21.87″E

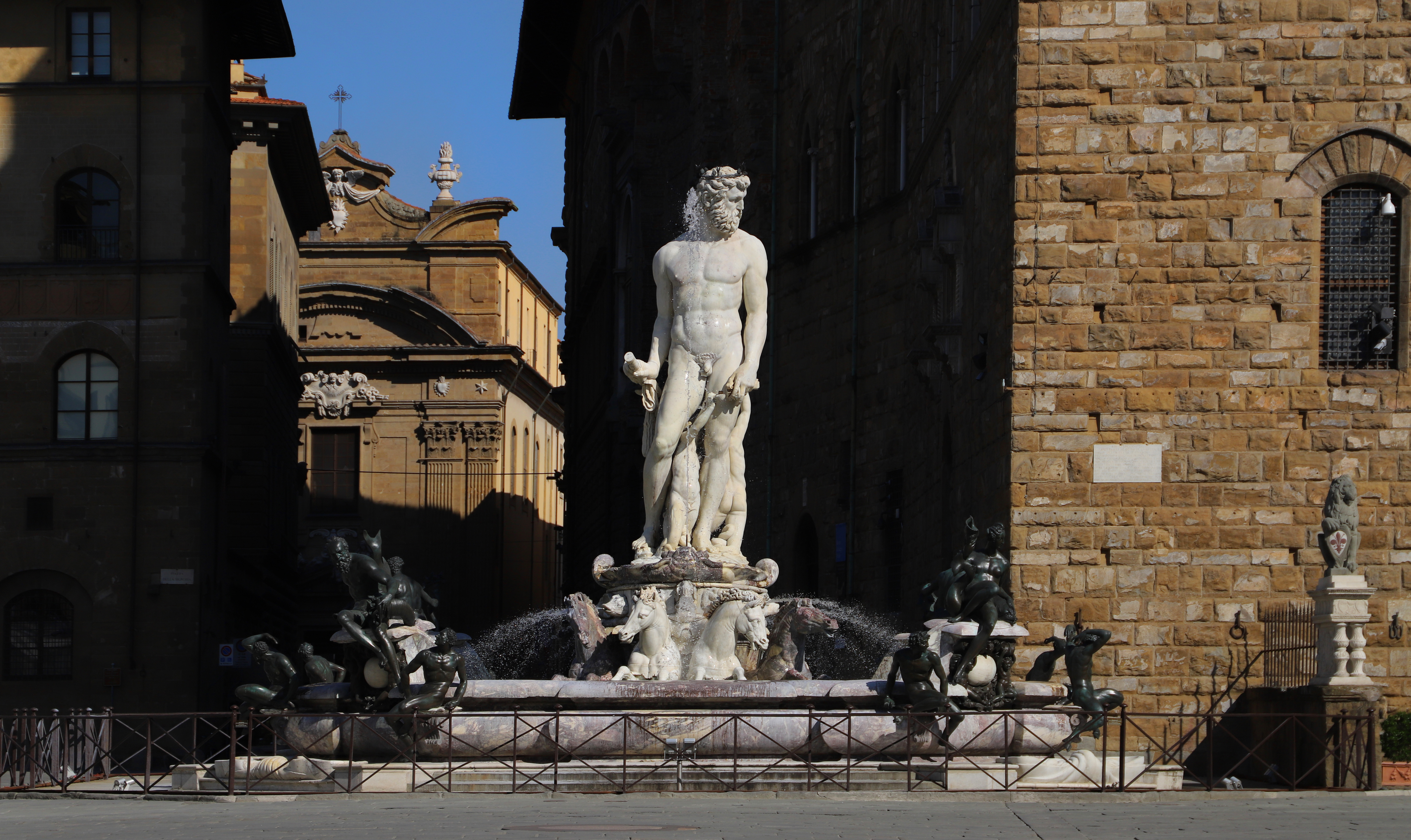
The Fountain of Neptune at mid-day

The Fountain of Neptune (Italian: Fontana del Nettuno) is situated in the Piazza della Signoria in Florence, Italy, near the northwest corner of the Palazzo Vecchio. It was commissioned by Cosimo I de' Medici in 1559 to celebrate his gift of clean water to the city, and later was appropriated to celebrate the marriage of his son and heir apparent Francesco de' Medici I to Grand Duchess Joanna of Austria.

The fountain was designed by Baccio Bandinelli, and executed by Bartolomeo Ammannati with several other artists between 1560 and 1574. It incorporates mythological figures and iconographies that symbolize Cosimo I de' Medici's power and the union of Francesco and Joanna.

It sustained considerable damage over the years and was restored in 2019.

== History ==
=== Creation ===
In 1559, Cosimo I de' Medici held a competition for a fountain of Neptune to celebrate Cosimo's gift of clean water to the city. Don Vincenzo Borghini was Cosimo's iconographer and responsible for overseeing the project. The commission was originally granted to Baccio Bandinelli, but after his death in 1560, before the project began, the commission was given to his student Bartolomeo Ammannati. This was the second commission Ammannati received from Cosimo; the first was for the Fountain of Juno celebrating Cosimo's bringing fresh water to the city.

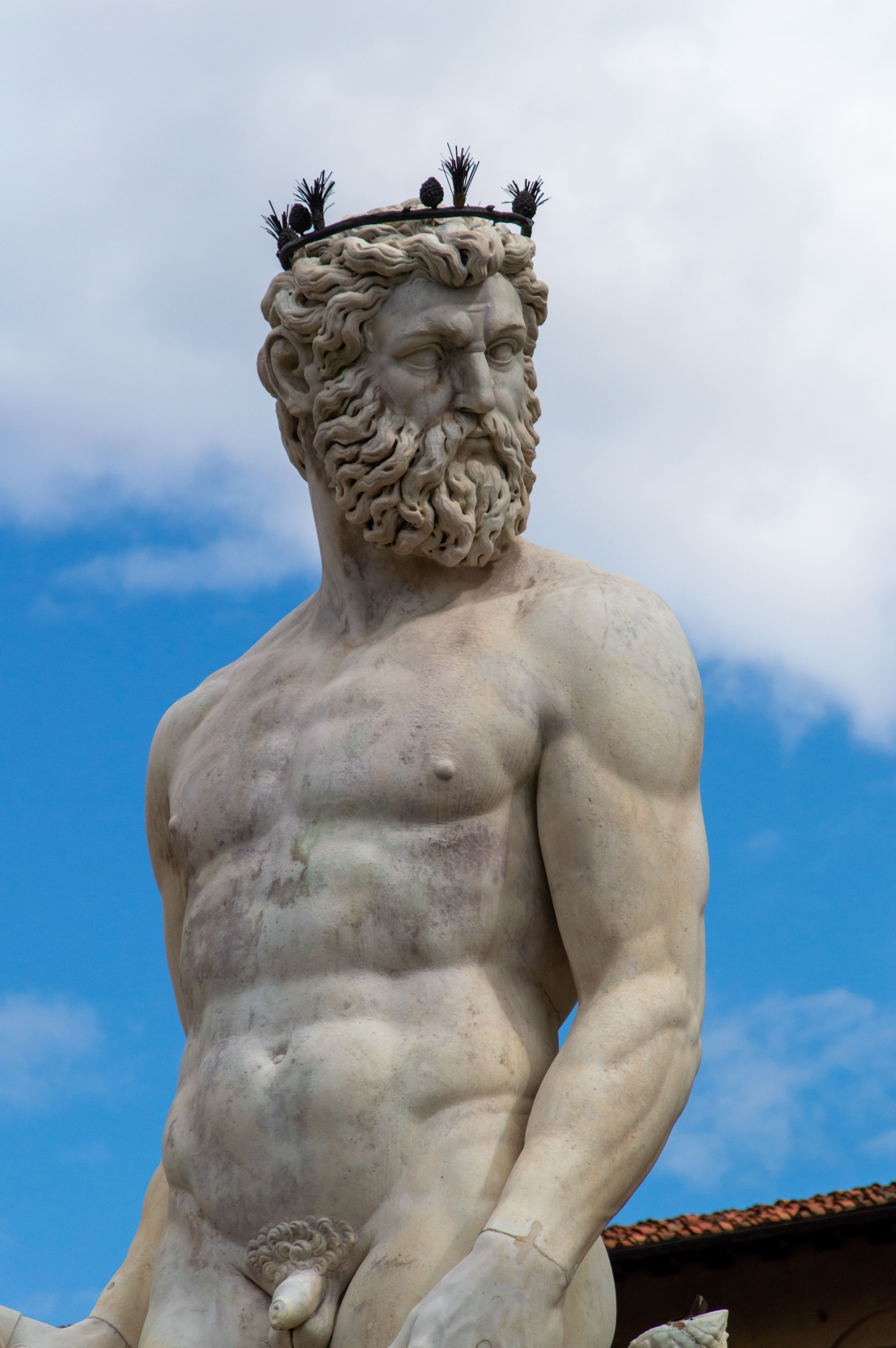
Close-up of the Neptune's statue

Ammannati created the Fountain of Neptune based on Bandinelli's designs. Ammannati was its main sculptor, and was assisted by Vincenzo de' Rossi, who cast the four satyrs, Giambologna, Andrea Calamech, Battista Fiammeri, and Cesare di Nicodemo. Rossi was also commissioned by Cosimo to create the Labors of Hercules after he lost the competition for the Neptune project.

The Fountain of Neptune consists of many different parts; aside from the giant Neptune atop a shell-shaped horse-drawn chariot, the fountain also has Tritons, Satyrs, two young women with Putti, two young men with dolphins, and Fauns. Neptune's features were modeled after Cosimo I de' Medici, which was appropriate parallel due to Cosimo's recent victory over Pisa, giving Florence safe access to the Mediterranean for trade. Ammannati's Neptune was unique because of its incredibly large scale and even though there were several Neptune fountains around Italy at the time, none of them had Neptune atop a horse-drawn chariot. The fountain was being built to celebrate the marriage of Francesco and Joanna, and the association of chariots with festivals and pageants could be the reason for Bandinelli's unusual incorporation of a horse-chariot. Because the fountain's scale was so large, it forced Ammannati to make some innovative choices when constructing his giant Neptune. Two of the horses were white marble, but the other two were made of mischio, a marble discovered near the Duke's excavation site in Seravezza. This new marble was a type of breccia and had a variety of colors including red, yellow and purple. Because this was a new medium, its qualities were unknown to sculptors at the time and the hard, brittle quality of the mischio made Ammannati's task even more difficult. Due to the brittle quality of mischio the columns of stone broke in transit, creating delays in the fountain's completion. Ammannati was finally able to carve the remainder of the horse and complete the fountain in 1574. The project was intended to be completed by 1565 for the celebration of Francesco de' Medici I and Joanna of Austria's wedding, but due to a myriad of delays in sourcing supplies for the fountain's completion, Ammannati was forced to come up with a temporary solution for the arrival of Johanna of Austria. Through the use of stucco and paint, Ammannati was able to create the illusion of a finished product. The combination of the Neptune as the subject matter and Ammannati's use of the duke's newly found stone (mischio) made the fountain symbolic of the duke's reign over the Mediterranean and the mountains.

=== Patron ===
Cosimo I de' Medici, Duke of Florence from 1537 to 1569, was largely responsible for shaping Florence into the city of the art and architecture that still stands today. Because of the significant transformation Florence underwent during his reign, Cosimo was often compared to Augustus and considered himself to be the architect of the new age of Florence. Some of Cosimo's most significant contributions to Florence include: the Sala Grande (now called the Salone dei Cinquecento) in the Palazzo Della Signoria, the Uffizi, the Fountain of Neptune, the Boboli Gardens, completing the Pitti Palace, and renovating churches such as Santa Maria Novella and Santa Croce. Although Cosimo contributed extensively to the city, it was not without personal gain. Cosimo's patronage was not only to provide public spaces and art for the citizens to enjoy, but it was also for his own political interests. His renovation of the churches were driven by a desire to gain favor with Rome and earn a grand ducal crown, which he received in 1569. The festivals he held between 1560 and 1574 were orchestrated to please the masses, while in turn, glorifying his reign. Behind Cosimo's commissions was an underlying glorification of the Medici Dynasty and his reign over Florence. Cosimo was not only a patron of the arts but he also freed Florence from imperial authority and established himself as lord of the new state of Florence.

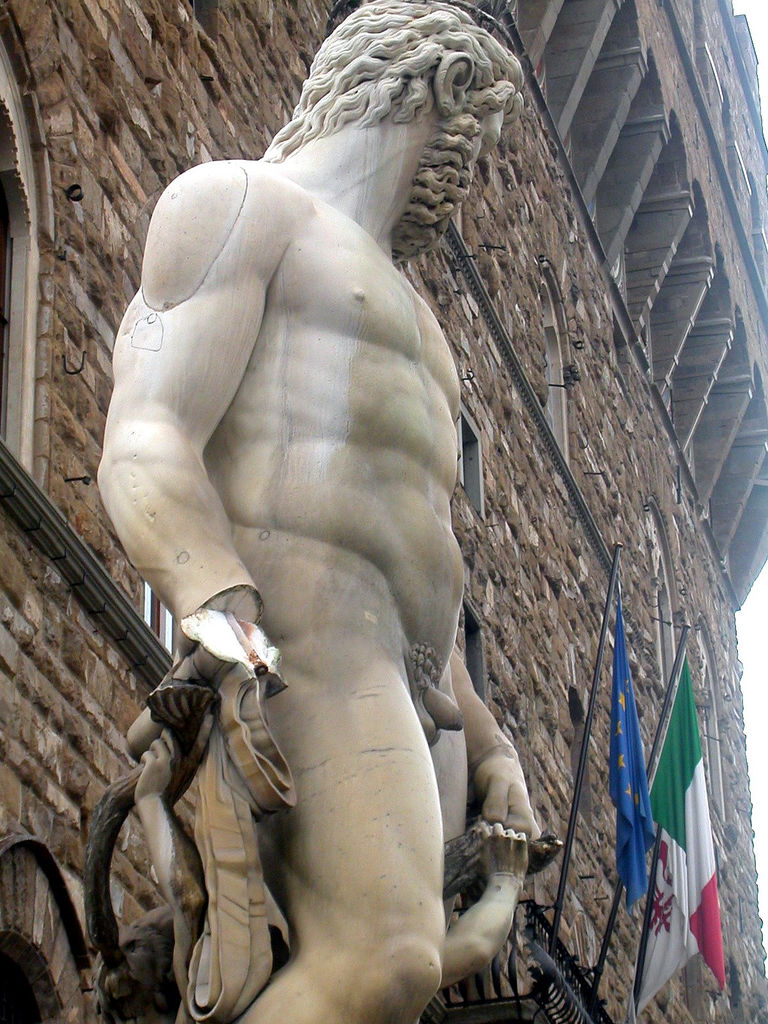
The fountain after its hand was cut off by vandals on the night of August 4, 2005

=== Vandalism and Restoration ===
The Fountain of Neptune began to suffer damage from almost the moment it was unveiled, as locals began to use it as a washbasin for inkpots and laundry, causing damage and discoloration to the marble. In 1580, almost the entire fountain was vandalized, leaving only a few figures untouched. It was damaged during celebrations in 1830 and 1848. During the 1980s, the horses were damaged several times. In 1982, Neptune's shoulder was painted after Italy won the World Cup. In 2005, a vandal attempted to climb Neptune, resulting in the loss of a hand, a broken trident and damage to the chariot. As a result, the city implemented stricter security measures in 2007 and 2009 by installing CCTV and increasing police patrols.

In 2017, Salvatore Ferragamo donated 1.5m€ for restoration of the fountain, which was completed in 2019. Repairs included a new pump, removing stains from the marble, patching cracks, and restoring rusted bronze figures.

== Mythology ==
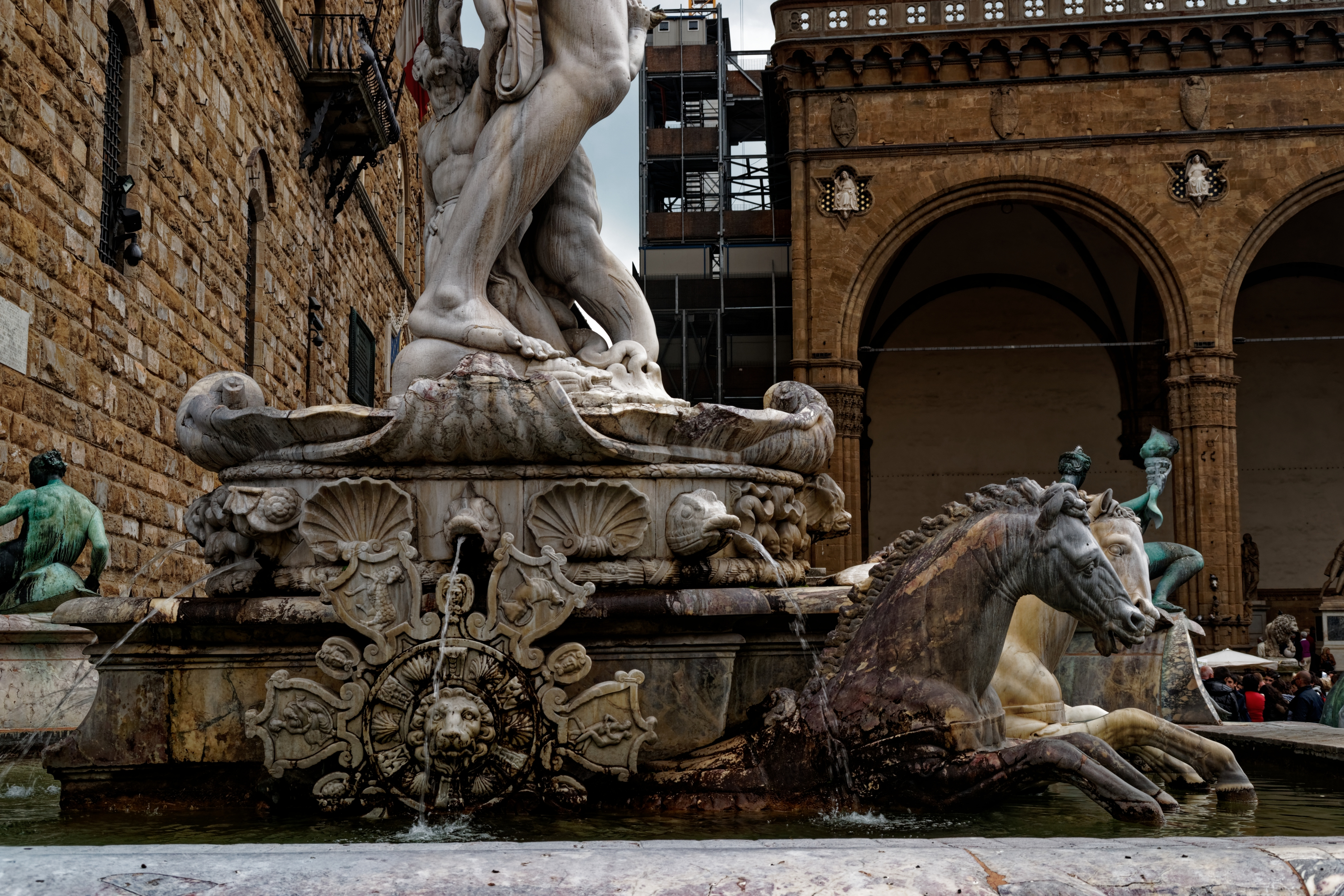
Wheel on Neptune's chariot with Zodiac signs

At first glance, the Zodiac signs engraved on Neptune's chariot follow a traditional pattern starting with Aries and ending with Virgo; however, after closer examination, the depiction of Virgo does not follow a traditional representation of Virgo as Virgin, but instead depicts her as a bride. Additionally, Virgo is presented with a unicorn seated on her lap. The combination of these two unusual elements alludes to biblical symbolism. These two figures are anointing this fountaining as a baptistry and proclaiming the water's purity. Philosophers such as Andrea Bacci suggest that the Virgo in Ammannati's fountain is representing Christ's bride and the unicorn represents the Christ child. Due to the well-established association of purity with both Virgo and unicorns, Ammannati's combination of these two figures creates a clear representation of Christ's purity. In Greek mythology, the unicorn's purity was so strong that even by placing the tip of its horn in water, it could purify the most toxic water. In Virgo's right hand we see a loaf of bread where an ear of corn usually lies, furthering the idea that this fountain is being proclaimed as a baptistry.

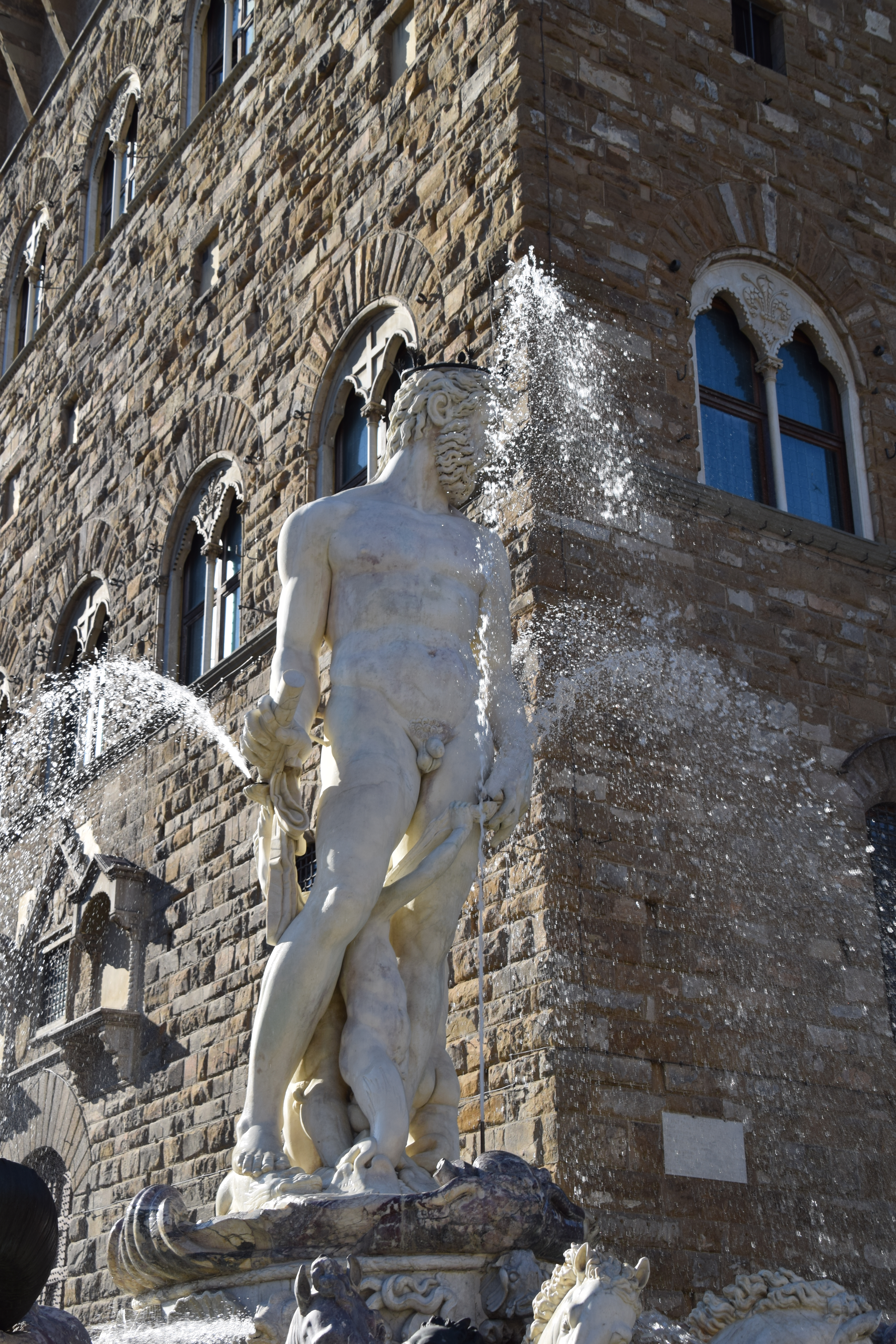
Close up of Neptune in static pose

The representation of Neptune in the Renaissance is particularly interesting because unlike many of the other Olympian deities, there were no surviving classical sculptures depicting Neptune available to artists in the Renaissance. This meant that the representation of Neptune was based upon the artist's personal interpretation of what he should look like. Because of this, the Italian representation of Neptune was different than that of Greek tradition. Unlike Neptune in Greek mythology, the Italian interpretation of Neptune was more human than god, much like Hercules. Over the course of the fifteenth century three main representations of Neptune emerged: static which was popular between the 1530s through 1560s, dynamic which was popular between 1504 and 1566, and synthesized which was an amalgamation of the two styles. The Neptune in Ammannati's Fountain was built in a static style, standing atop his chariot of horses. The representation of Neptune in static style was popular in Florence at the time and was frequently used in fountains; however, there are two elements worth noting that made Ammannati's representation of Neptune slightly different than others. Ammannati's Neptune is wearing a crown and holding a lash in his right hand. Both the crown and the lash were a reference to earthly rulers, making this specific representation of Neptune symbolic of a contemporary ruler i.e. Cosimo I de' Medici, rather than an Olympian deity.

== Similar statuary ==
Cosimo I de' Medici commissioned a second Fountain of Neptune in 1565. This second fountain was a bronze sculpture created by Stoldo Lorenzi and was placed in the main axis of the Boboli Garden behind the Palazzo Pitti in Florence and was a symbol of the Medici's power over Florence. Another Fountain of Neptune lies in Bologna's Piazza Maggiore. This fountain was commissioned by Cardinal Legate Charles Borromeo and was built between 1563 and 1566 by a nameless Flemish artist known as Giambologna who also assisted with The Fountain of Neptune in Florence.

== Gallery ==
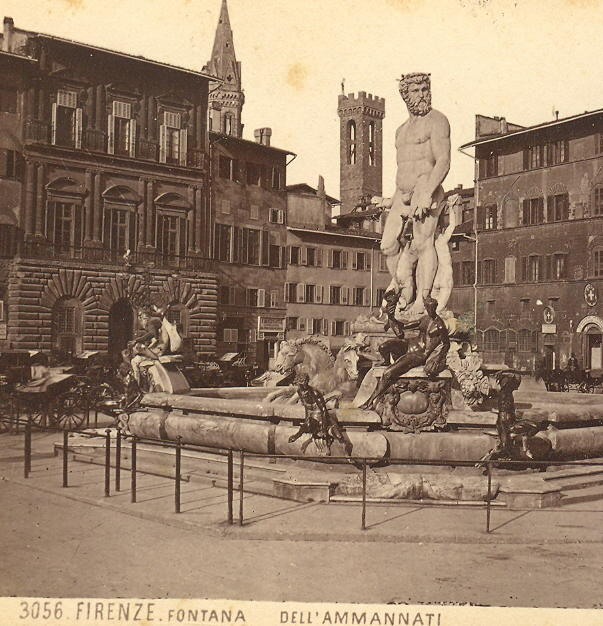
Giacomo Brogi, stereo card, before 1881

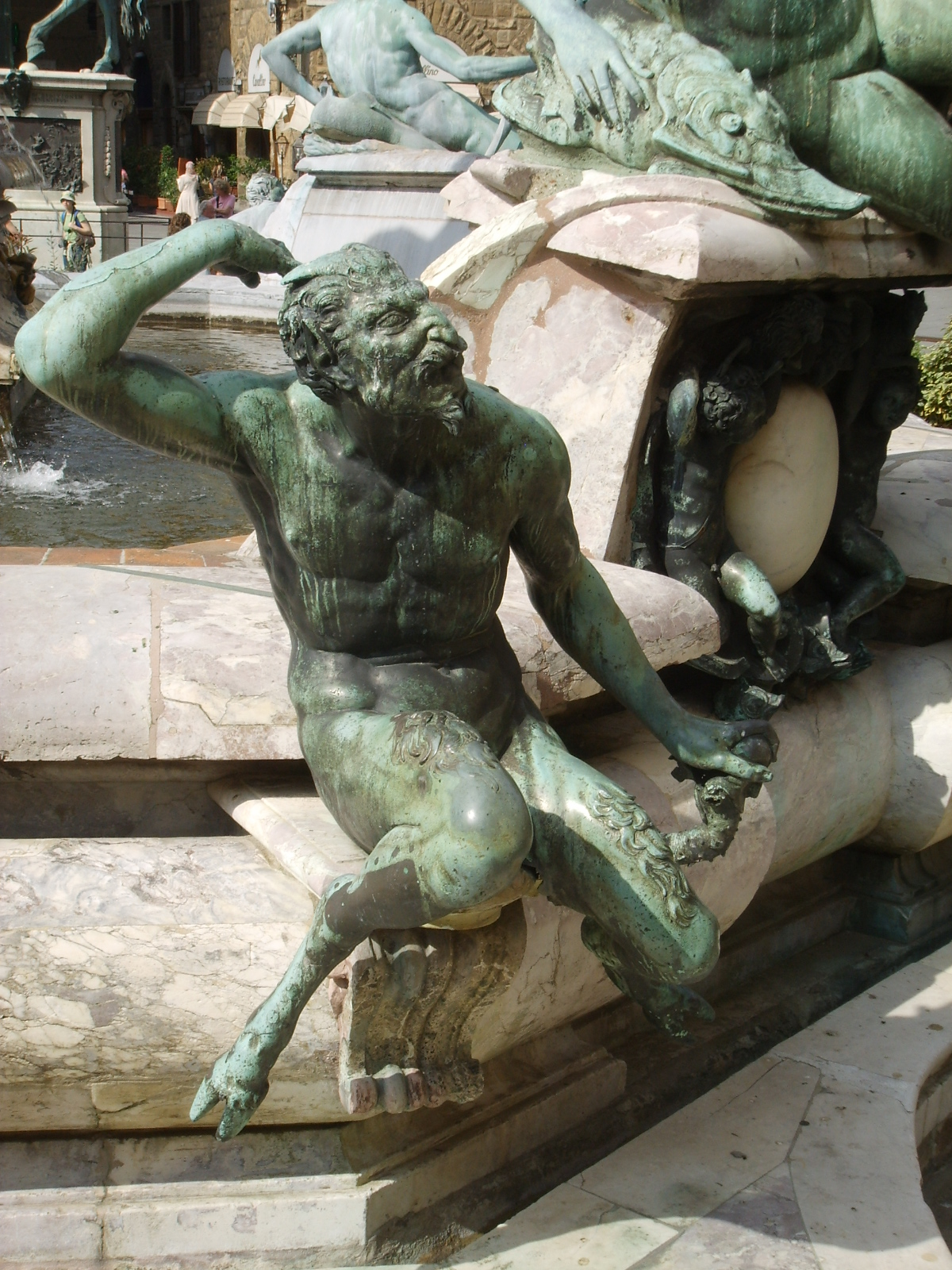
Giambologna's satyr

Fountain facing Neptune's face.
