= Fountain of Neptune, Bologna =

Fountain in Bologna, Italy

Fountain of Neptune
- Fontana del Nettuno
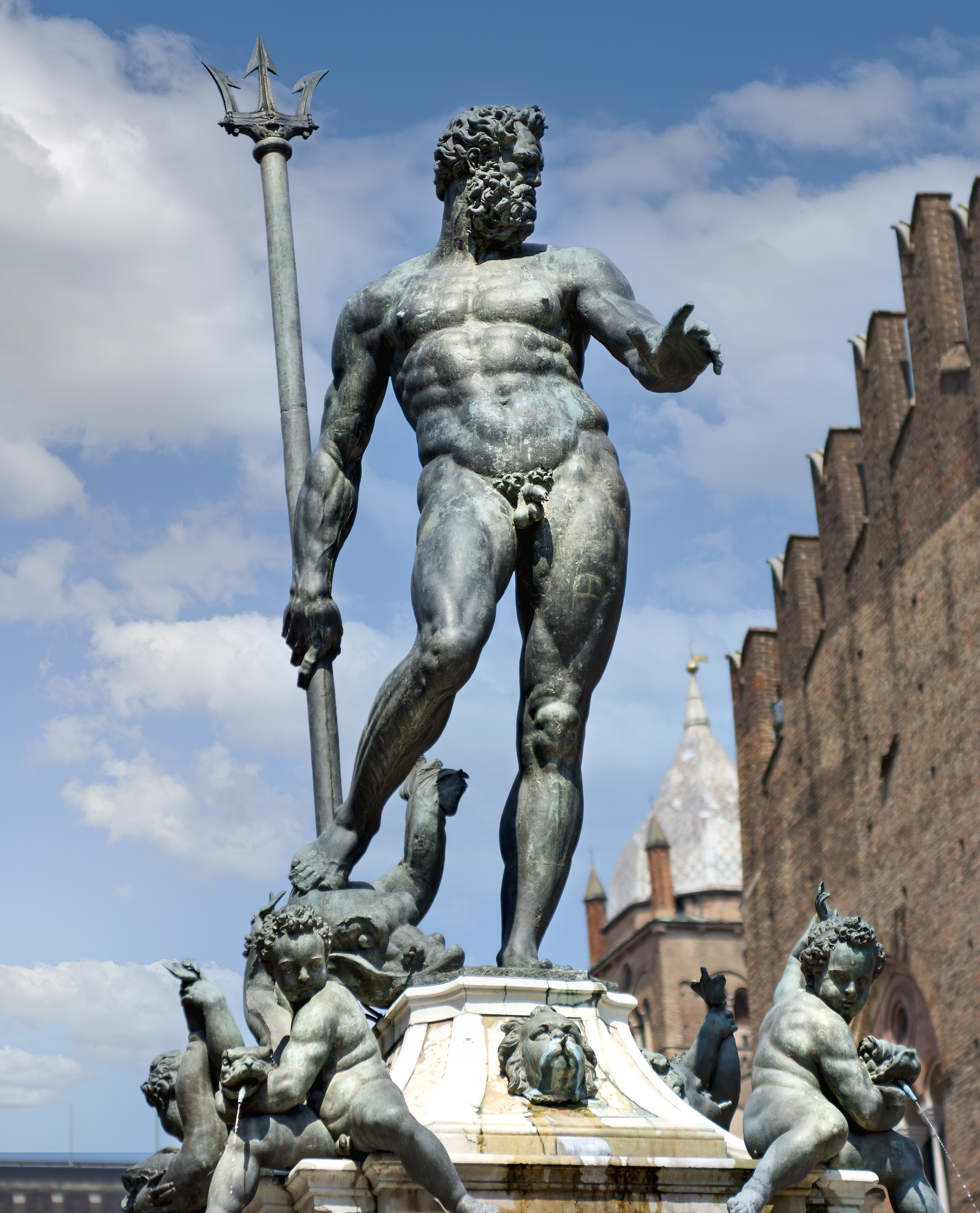
- The Fountain of Neptune
- Interactive map of Fountain of Neptune
- Location: Bologna, Italy
- Coordinates: 44°29′40″N 11°20′33″E
- Designer: Tommaso Laureti & Giambologna
- Type: Fountain
- Material: Bronze and stone
- Beginning date: 1563
- Completion date: 1566

The Fountain of Neptune (Italian: Fontana del Nettuno) is a monumental civic fountain located in the eponymous square, Piazza del Nettuno, next to Piazza Maggiore, in Bologna, Italy. The fountain is a model example of Mannerist taste of the Italian courtly elite in the mid-sixteenth century.

== History ==
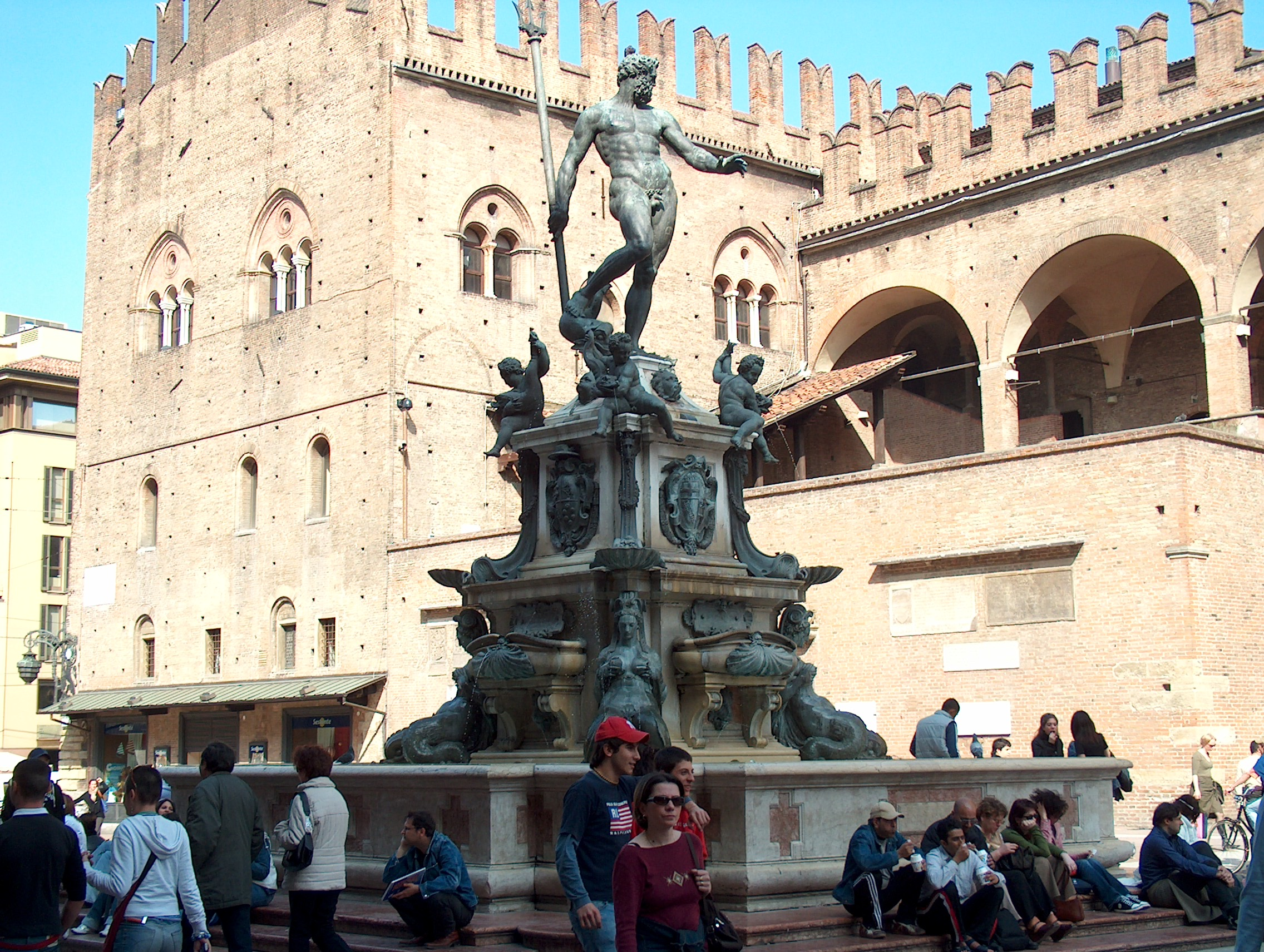
Photograph of the entire artwork, including its basin.

The construction of the fountain was commissioned by the Cardinal Legate Charles Borromeo, to symbolize the fortunate recent election of Borromeo's uncle as Pope Pius IV. To clear space for the fountain, an entire edifice had to be demolished.

The design and assembly of the fountain was completed by the Palermitan architect Tommaso Laureti in 1563. The fountain was completed in 1565. The over-life-size bronze figure of the god Neptune was completed and fixed in place around 1566. The statue was an early design by Giambologna, who had submitted a model for the Fountain of Neptune in Florence, but had lost the commission to Baccio Bandinelli.

== Description ==
Neptune Fountain has its base on three steps, on which it is situated a tank made of the local boulder and covered by marble of Verona. In the centre of the tank, there is a base where there are four Nereids holding their breasts, from which jets of water emerge. The base is decorated with pontifical emblems, ornaments that – connected to four cherubs – hold dolphins (which are allegorical representation of major rivers from the then-known corners of the world: the Ganges, the Nile, the Amazon River, and the Danube. In the centre of this base raises the majestic figure of the Neptune sculpted by Giambologna's; the statue is a typical expressions of the manneristic theatricality.

The Neptune stretches his left hand in a lordly gesture, appearing to be aiming to placate the waves; this posture is interpreted as symbolic exaltation of the new power of the Pope Pius IV: just as Neptune was the master of the seas, the Pope was the master of Bologna and of the world.

== Inscriptions ==
On the four sides of the marble tank there are four inscriptions in Latin provide the background to the fountain's construction:

1. Fori Ornamento (to decorate the square);
2. Aere Publico (built thanks to public money);
3. Populi Commodo (built for the people);
4. MDLXIIII (built in 1564; the date is wrong though, since the fountain was officially finished in 1566).

The four main sources of political power for Bologna then are also inscribed on the base:

1. Pius IIII Pont. Max (Pope Pius IV);
2. Petrus Donatus Caesius Gubernator; (Governor Pier Donato Cesi);
3. Carolus Borromaeus Cardinalis; (Cardinal Carlo Borromeo);
4. S.P.Q.B. (Senatus Populusque Bonononiensis) (Senate and the People of Bologna).

== Symbolism ==
The trident of the Neptune's statue inspired and it was used by Maserati brothers as emblem for their first car, the Maserati Tipo 26. The logo was realized in 1920 by one of the brothers, Mario Maserati, at the suggestion of a family friend, Marquis Diego de Sterlich. This is still today the logo of the Maserati car company.

The fountain and its sculpture are one of the most iconic symbols of the city and references to them can be found in many symbols, commercials and logos. This includes the historical students' fraternity (Goliardia) "Excelsa Neptuni Balla", on whose emblem figure two tridents.

== Copies ==
Several copies of the fountain exist around the world, such as in Laeken (a suburb of Brussels) commissioned by King Leopold II; in Palos Verdes Estates in California; and in Batumi in Georgia. A copy of the statue of Neptune can be found at the entrance of the Yamato Museum in Hiroshima, Japan, while a cast – made in 1907 – is kept in the Bologna's Archeological Museum.

== See also ==
- Fountain of Neptune, Florence
- Neptune's Fountain, Gdańsk
- Neptune
- Mythology
