= Bartolomeo Ammannati =

Italian architect and sculptor

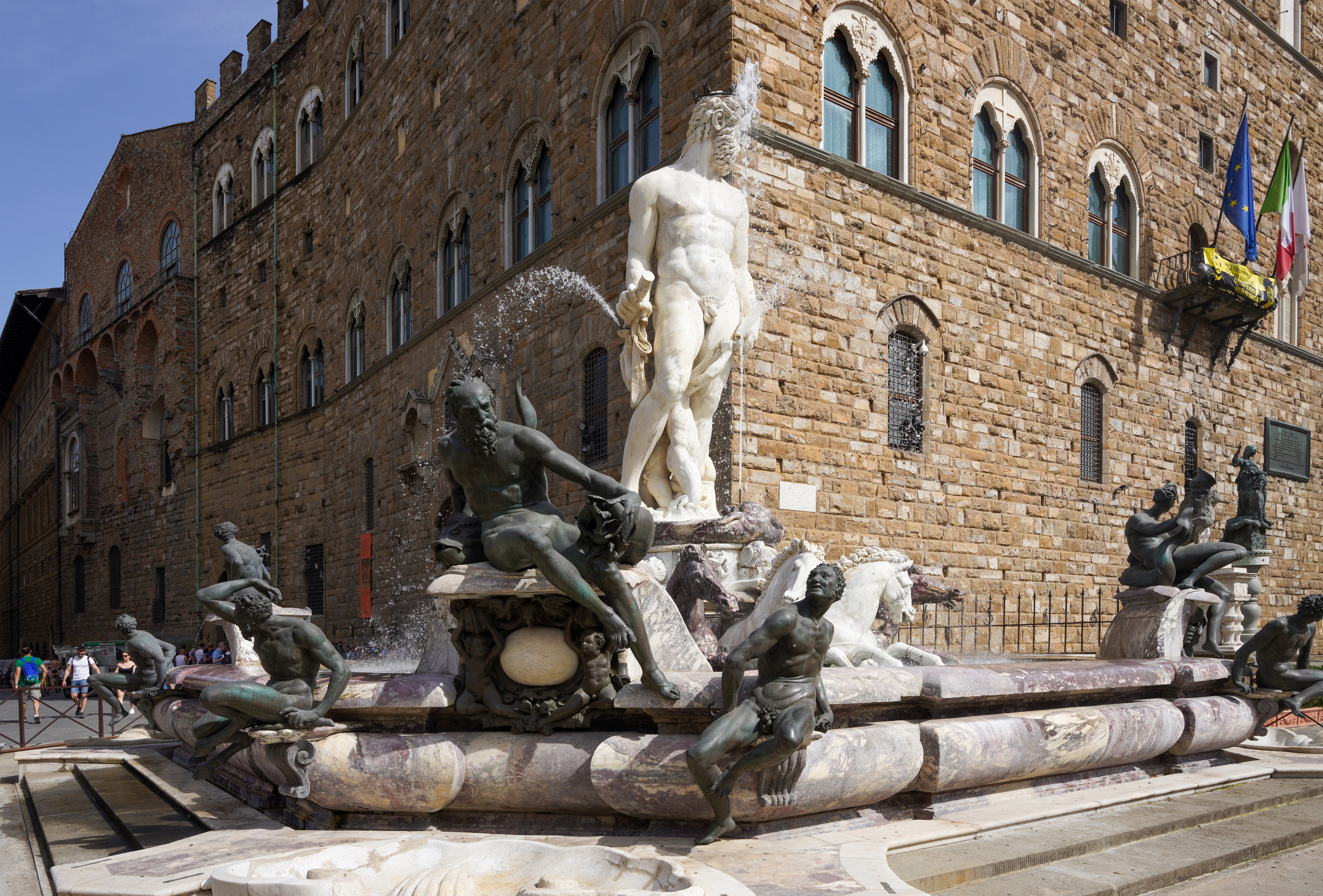
The Fountain of Neptune (Fontana del Nettuno) on the Piazza della Signoria in Florence, Italy

Bartolomeo Ammannati (18 June 1511 – 13 April 1592) was an Italian architect and sculptor, born at Settignano, near Florence, Italy. He studied under Baccio Bandinelli and Jacopo Sansovino (assisting on the design of the Library of St. Mark's, the Biblioteca Marciana, Venice) and closely imitated the style of Michelangelo.

He was more distinguished in architecture than in sculpture. He worked in Rome in collaboration with Vignola and Vasari, including designs for the Villa Giulia, but also for works at Lucca. He labored during 1558–1570, in the refurbishment and enlargement of Pitti Palace, creating the courtyard consisting of three wings with rusticated facades, and one lower portico leading to the amphitheatre in the Boboli Gardens. His design mirrored the appearance of the main external façade of Pitti. He was also named Consul of Accademia delle Arti del Disegno of Florence, which had been founded by the Duke Cosimo I in 1563.

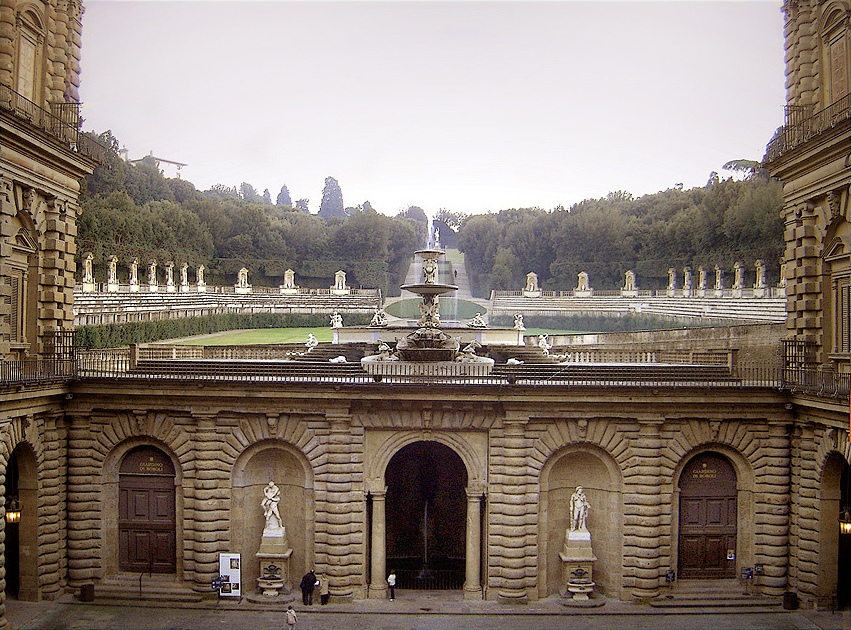
Garden view above the Ammannati Courtyard in the Pitti Palace

In 1569, Ammannati was commissioned to build the Ponte Santa Trinita, a bridge over the Arno River. The three arches are elliptic, and though very light and elegant, has survived, when floods had damaged other Arno bridges at different times. Santa Trinita was destroyed in 1944, during World War II, and rebuilt in 1957.

Ammannati designed what is considered a prototypic Mannerist sculptural ensemble in the Fountain of Neptune (Fontana del Nettuno), prominently located in the Piazza della Signoria in the center of Florence. The assignment was originally given to the aged Bartolommeo Bandinelli; however when Bandinelli died, Ammannati's design bested the submissions of Benvenuto Cellini and Vincenzo Danti, resulting in Ammanati gaining the commission. From 1563 and 1565, Ammannati and his assistants, among them Giambologna, sculpted the block of marble that had been chosen by Bandinelli. He took Grand Duke Cosimo I as model for Neptune's face. The statue was meant to highlight Cosimo's goal of establishing a Florentine Naval force. The ungainly sea god was placed at the corner of the Palazzo Vecchio within sight of Michelangelo's David statue, and the then 87-year-old sculptor is said to have scoffed at Ammannati— saying that he had ruined a beautiful piece of marble— with the ditty: "Ammannati, Ammanato, che bel marmo hai rovinato!" Ammannati continued work on this fountain for a decade, adding around the perimeter a cornucopia of demigod figures: bronze reclining river gods, laughing satyrs and marble sea horses emerging from the water.

In 1550 Ammannati married Laura Battiferri, an elegant poet and an accomplished woman. Later in his life he had a religious crisis, influenced by Counter-Reformation piety, which resulted in condemning his own works depicting nudity, and he left all his possessions to the Jesuits.

He died in Florence in 1592.

== Works ==
- Victory (1540), marble, Museo Nazionale del Bargello, Florence
- Leda with the Swan, marble, also in Bargello, Florence
- Venus (1558–59), marble, Prado Museum, Madrid
- Parnassus (1563), marble, Museo Nazionale del Bargello, Florence
- Allegory of Winter (1563–65), stone, Villa Medici, Castello
- Goddess Opi (1572–75), bronze, Palazzo Vecchio, Florence

== Gallery ==
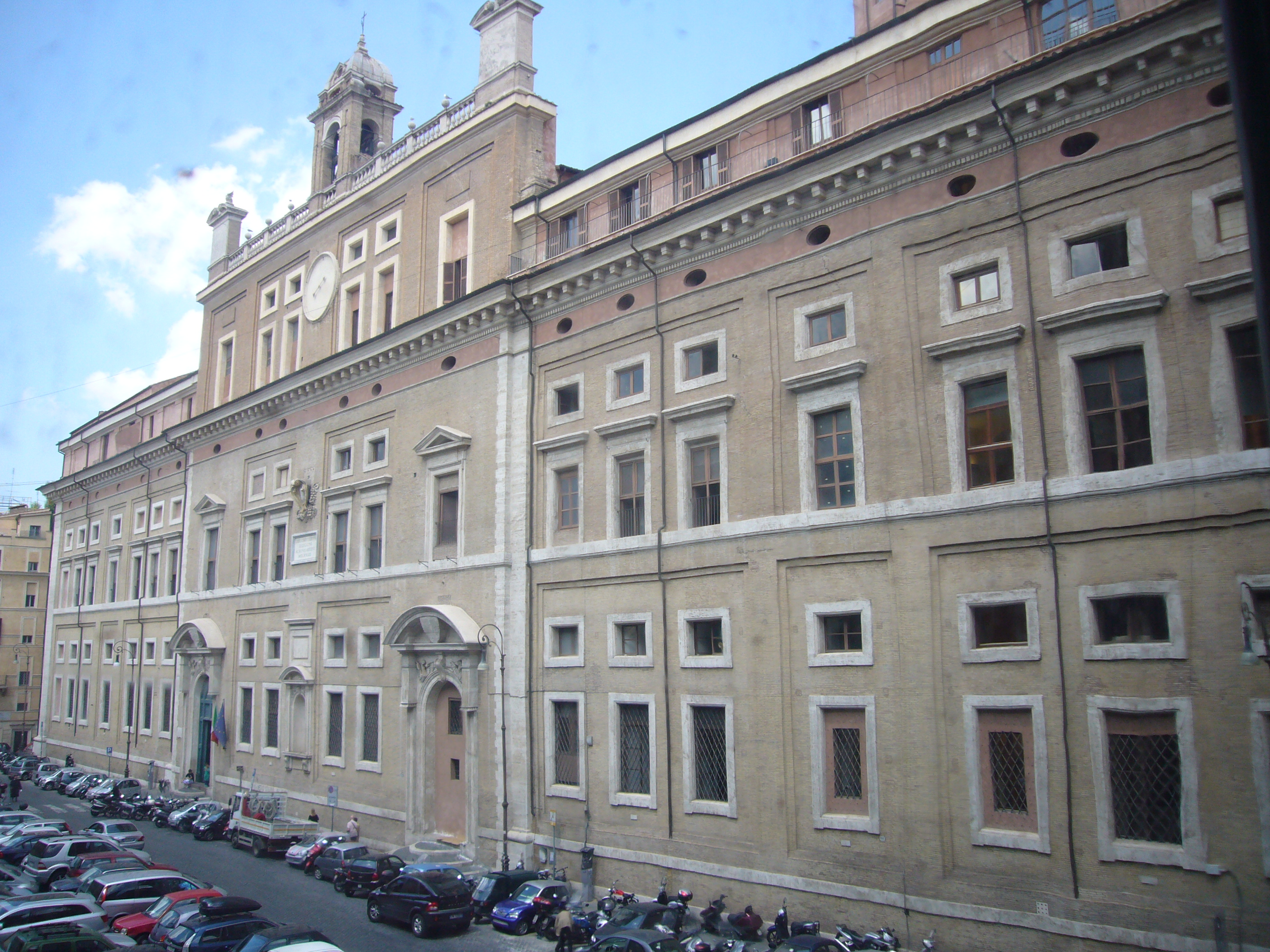
The Jesuit College in Rome, 1582–1584, was one of Ammannati's later designs.

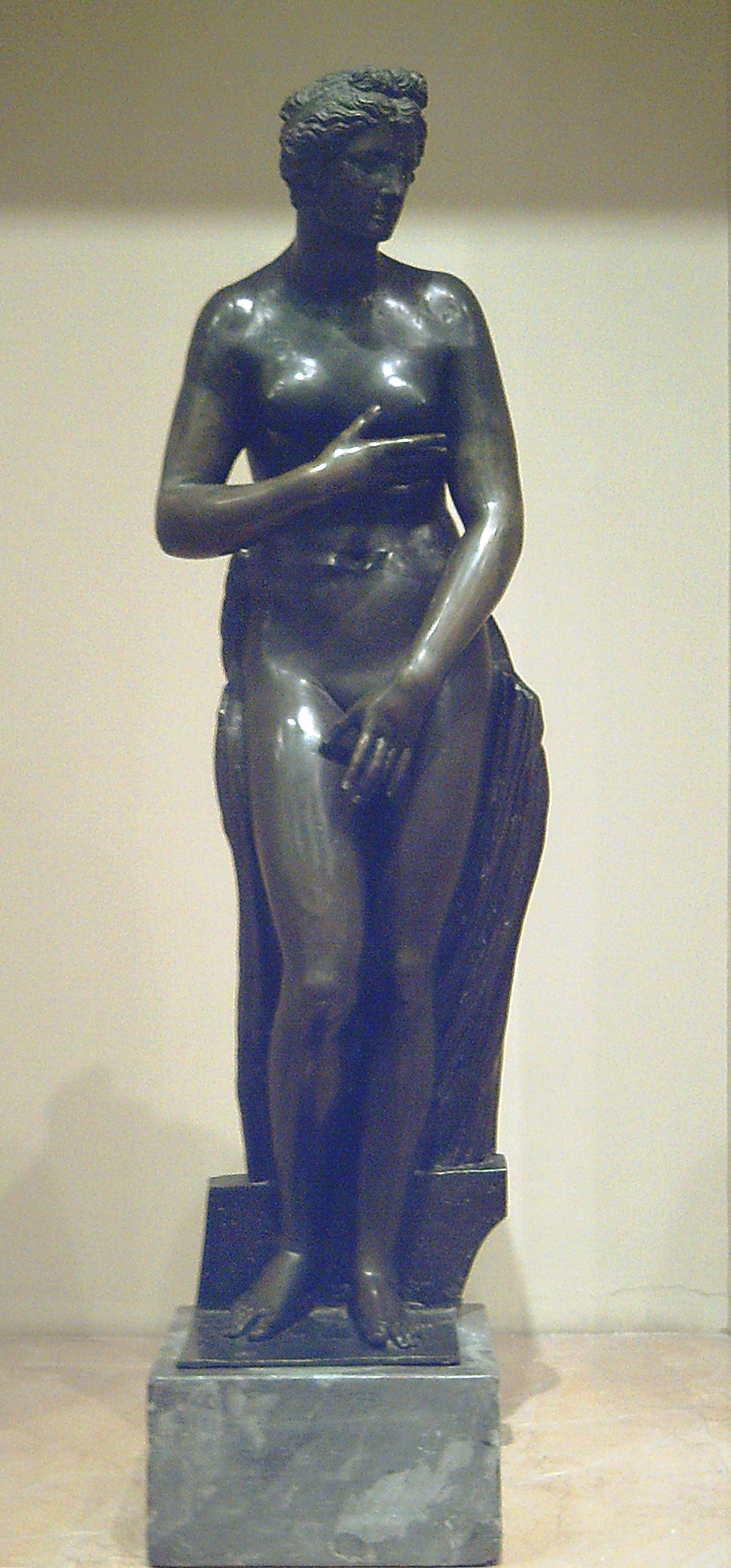
Venus, a variation on the classical type known as Venus Pudica. However, the arms are the result of an 18th-century restoration, as the original had the arms cut off in order to allow water to flow out.

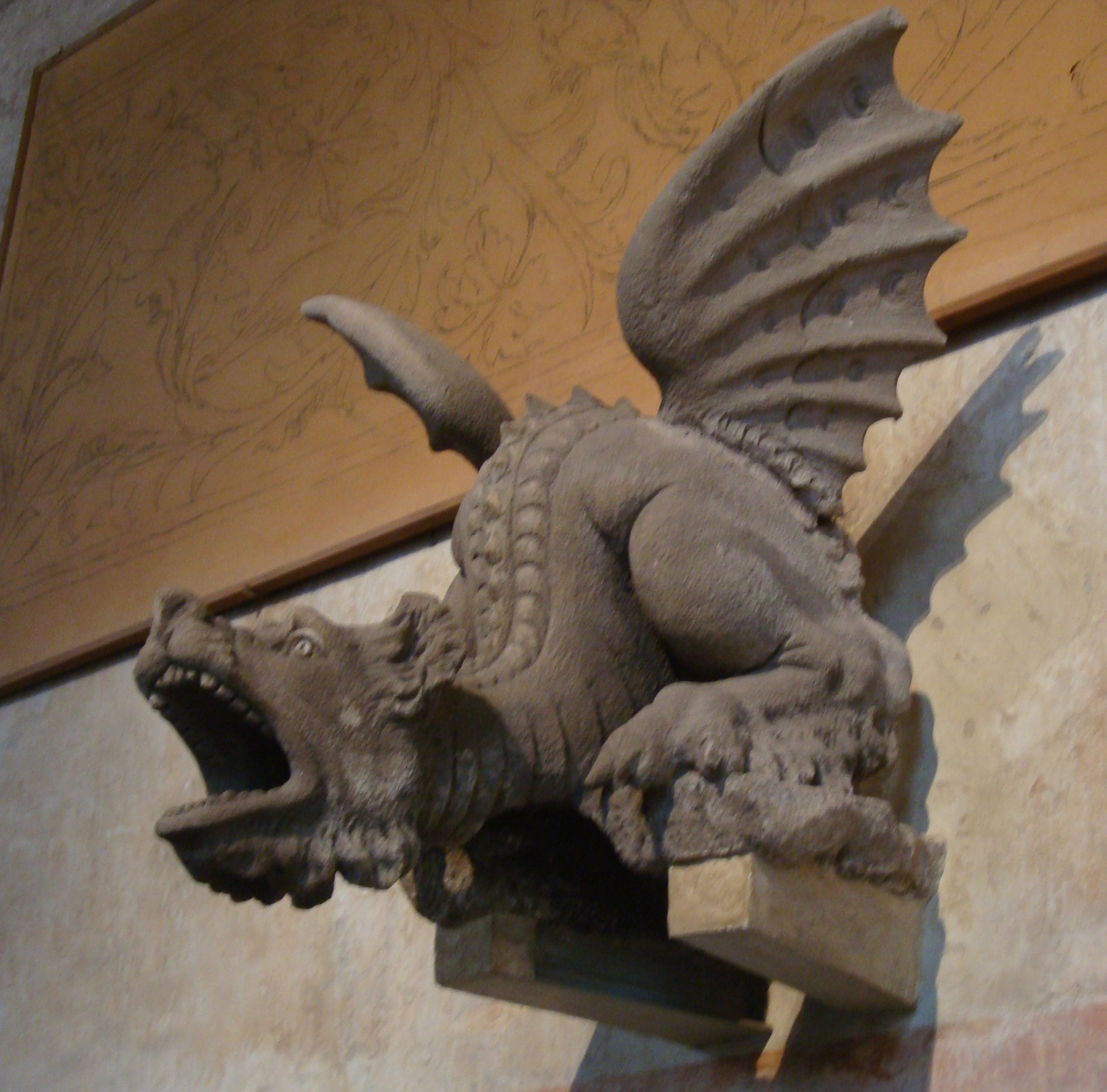
Dragon

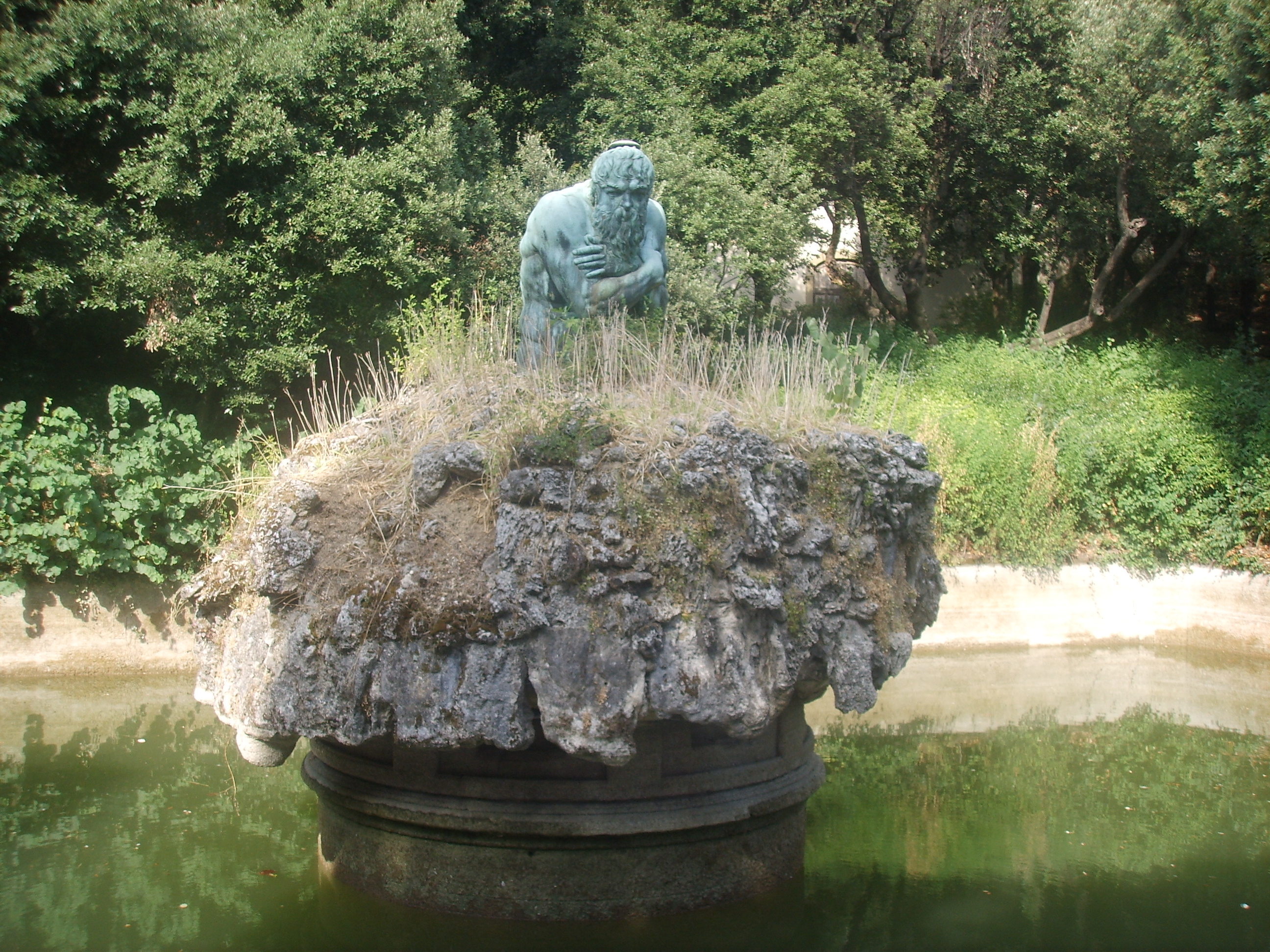
Parco di Villa Reale di Castello (Villa di Castello), Fountain of January (Fontana del Gennaio) in Florence, Italy

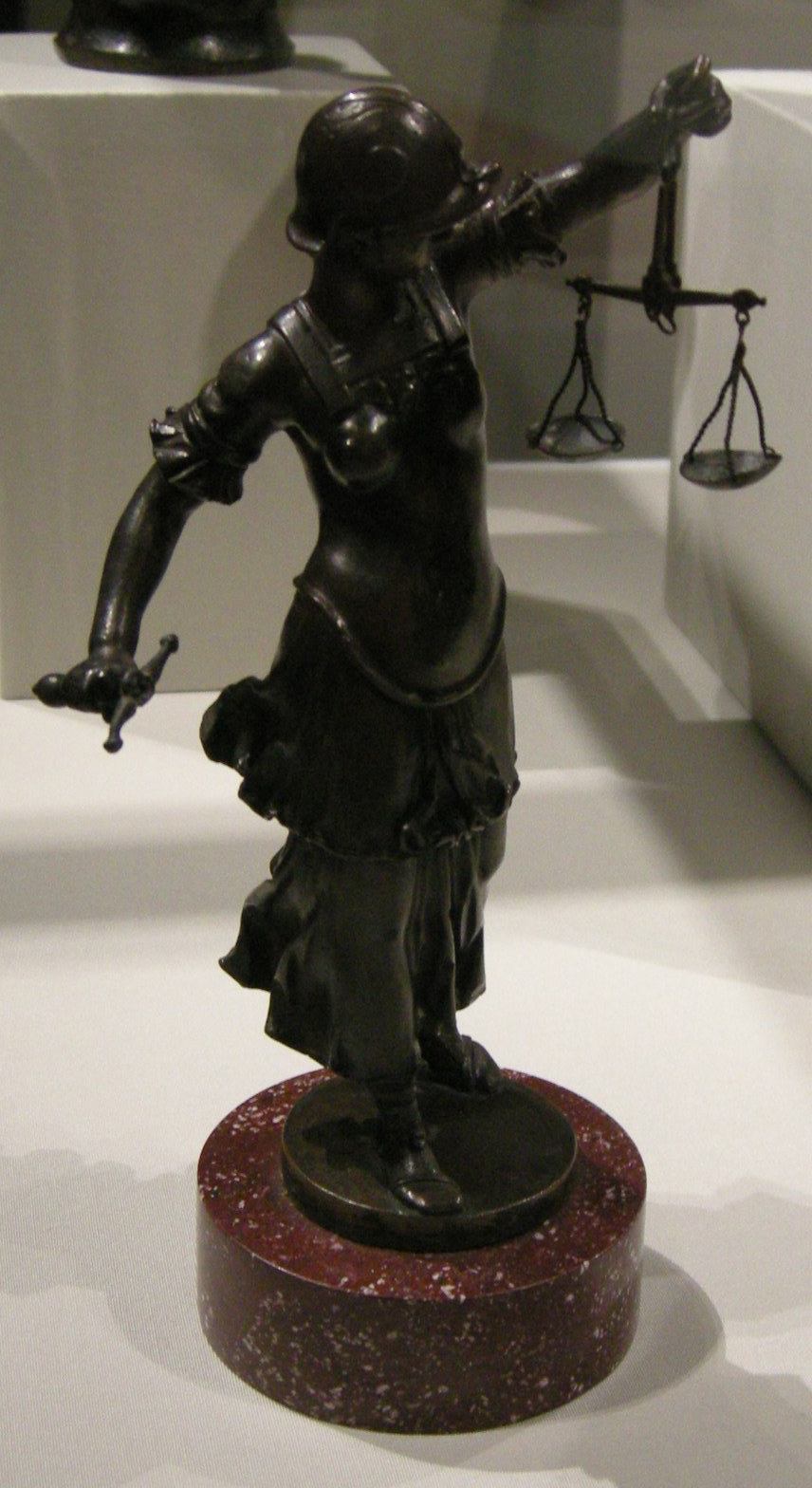
Justice

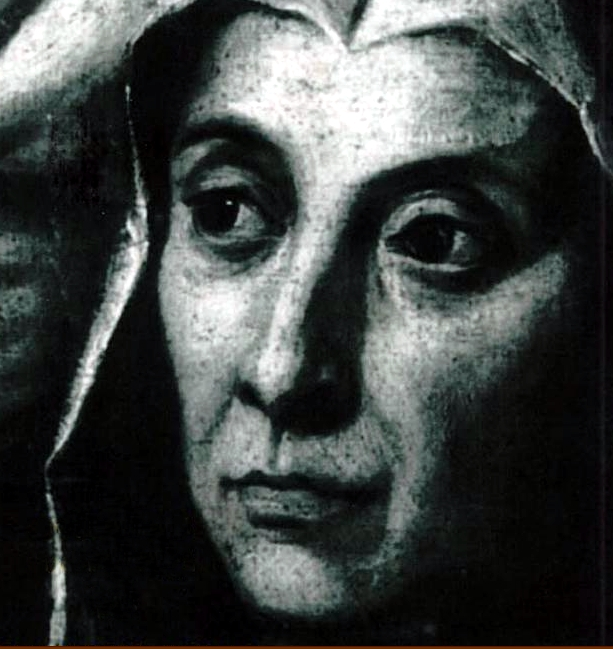
Christ and Canaanite woman by Alessandro Allori. Commissioned by Ammannati for funeral of his wife poet Laura Battiferri (painted as old woman with the book).

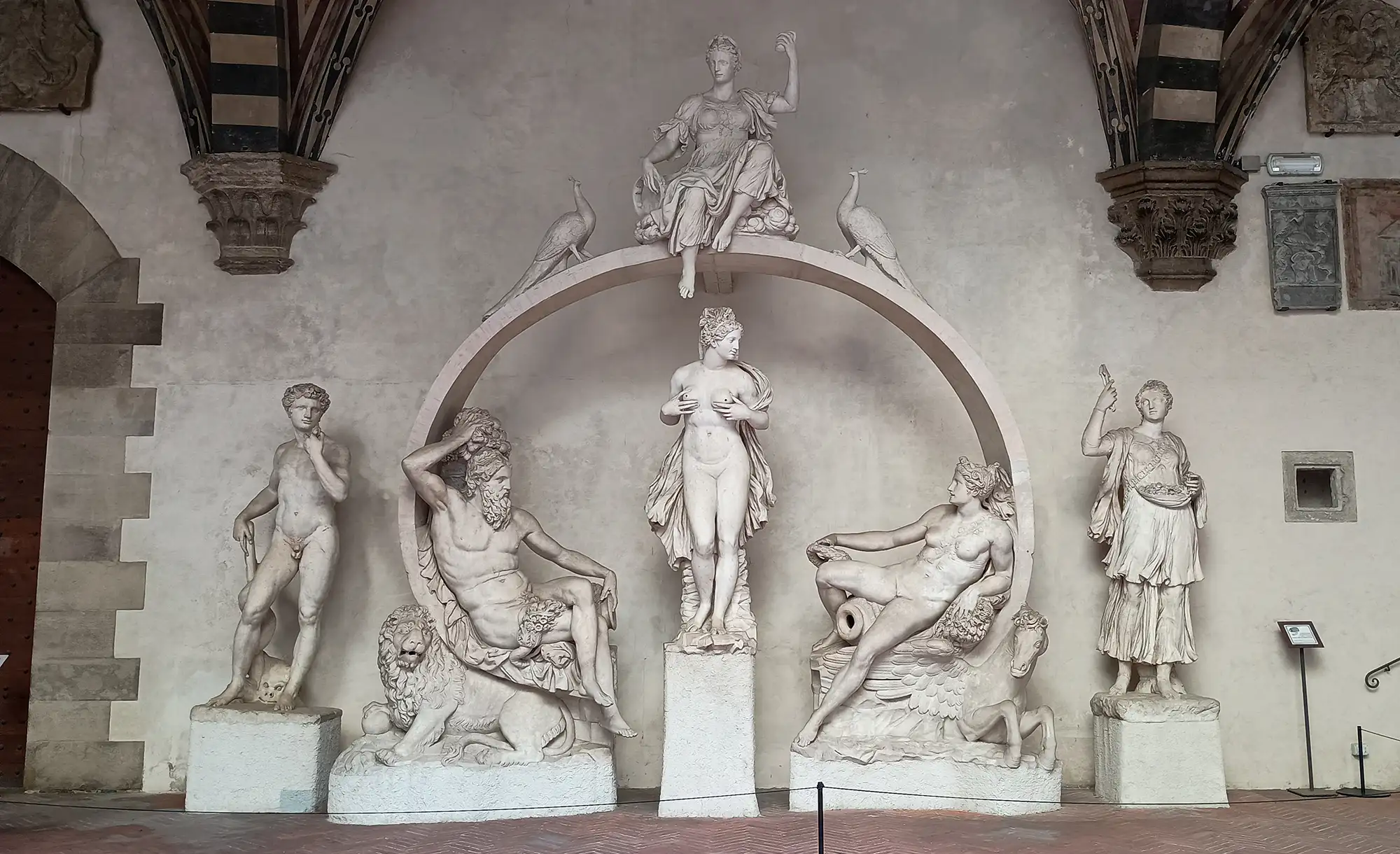
Fontana di Sala Grande by Bartolomeo Ammannati, 1556 - 1561. Museo Nazionale del Bargello, Florence, Italy.
