= Giambologna =

Flemish-born Mannerist sculptor in Italy

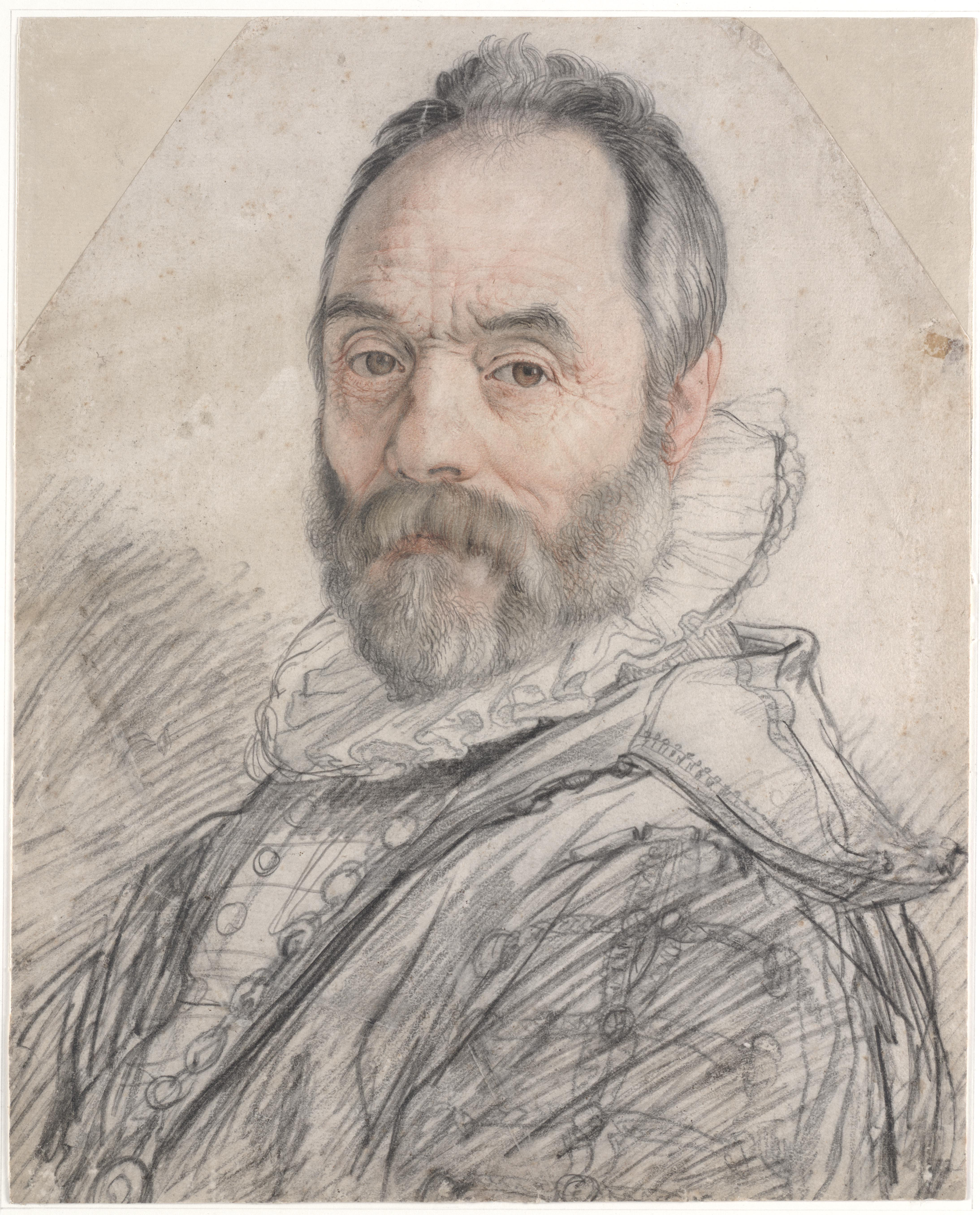
Portrait of Giambologna by Hendrick Goltzius, collection Teylers Museum

Giambologna (1529 – 13 August 1608), also known as Jean de Boulogne (French), Jehan Boulongne (Flemish) and Giovanni da Bologna (Italian), was the last significant Italian Renaissance sculptor, with a large workshop producing large and small works in bronze and marble in a late Mannerist style.

== Biography ==
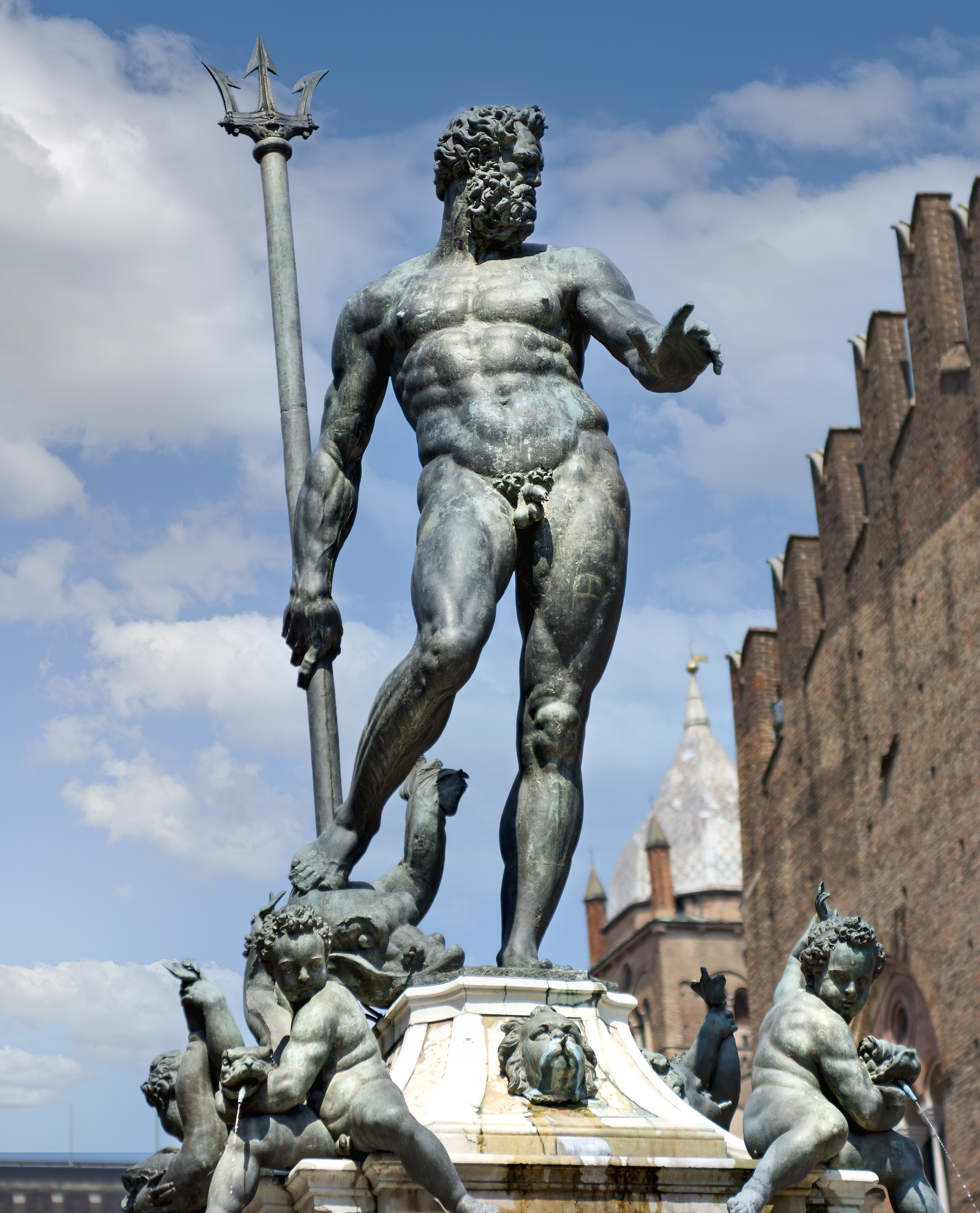
Giambologna's Neptune, atop the Fountain of Neptune, Bologna (c. 1567)

Giambologna was born in Douai, Flanders (then in the Habsburg Netherlands and now in France), in 1529. After youthful studies in Antwerp with the architect-sculptor Jacques Du Brœucq, he moved to Italy in 1550 and studied in Rome, making a detailed study of the sculpture of classical antiquity. He was also much influenced by Michelangelo, but developed his own Mannerist style, with perhaps less emphasis on emotion and more emphasis on refined surfaces, cool elegance, and beauty. Pope Pius IV gave Giambologna his first major commission, the colossal bronze Neptune and subsidiary figures for the Fountain of Neptune (the base designed by Tommaso Laureti, 1566) in Bologna.

Giambologna spent his most productive years in Florence, where he had settled in 1553, initially guested at Palazzo Vecchietti. In 1563, he was named a member (Accademico) of the prestigious Accademia delle Arti del Disegno, just founded by the Duke Cosimo I de' Medici, on 13 January 1563, under the influence of the painter-architect Giorgio Vasari, becoming also one of the Medicis' most important court sculptors. He died in Florence at the age of 79; the Medici had never allowed him to leave Florence, as they rightly feared that either the Austrian or Spanish Habsburgs would entice him into permanent employment. He was interred in a chapel he designed himself in the Santissima Annunziata.

== Work ==
Giambologna became well known for a fine sense of action and movement, and a refined, differentiated surface finish.

Among his celebrated works are the Mercury in Flight, poised on one foot, supported by a zephyr. The god raises one arm to point heavenwards in a gesture borrowed from the repertory of classical rhetoric (Note: Compare the figure of Plato in Raphael's School of Athens.) that is characteristic of Giambologna's style.

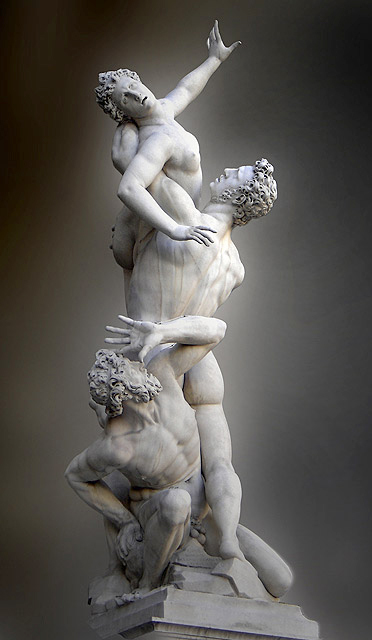
Abduction of a Sabine Woman (1574–1582), Loggia dei Lanzi, Florence. The title was only assigned after completion. (Note: In many texts, the piece is given the name Rape of a Sabine Woman. This old-fashioned translation of Latin: raptae (or Italian: rapina) as rape used to be standard. Here the word actually means "kidnap" or "abduction")

His marble sculpture Abduction of a Sabine Woman (1574–1582) (Note: The reference is to an incident in Roman mythology. This is one of many neoclassical sculptures on this theme. The name was one attached by his contemporaries rather his.) is featured prominently in the Loggia dei Lanzi in Florence's Piazza della Signoria. This sculpture, which includes three full figures, was carved from a single piece of marble. Giambologna carved it without a subject in mind, and the name Abduction of a Sabine Woman was given after it was in place in the Loggia. The sculpture was produced for Francesco I de' Medici, Grand Duke of Tuscany. Another of his marbles, Hercules Slaying a Centaur was also placed in the Loggia dei Lanzi in 1599.

Giambologna's several depictions of Venus established a canon of proportions for the female figure, and set reference models for representation of the goddess that were influential for two generations of sculptors in Italy and Northern Europe.

He created allegories strongly promoting Medicean political propaganda, such as Florence Triumphant over Pisa and, less overtly, Samson Slaying a Philistine, for Francesco de' Medici (1562). The latter marble was made for a Medici fountain, its dramatic composition fitting its violent subject from whichever direction it is viewed. It is the only large marble work by Giambologna to have left Florence. It was given to the Duke of Lerma, then to Charles, Prince of Wales, at the time of negotiations for the Spanish Match; it was given by George III to Sir Thomas Worsley, at Hovingham Hall, Norfolk; it was purchased in 1953 for the Victoria and Albert Museum through the Art Fund.

On Michelangelo's death in 1564, Daniele da Volterra created several busts of the sculptor from his death mask. After Volterra died in 1566, one of these busts was delivered to Giambologna, who around 1570 sculpted a clothed upper torso for the bust.

The equestrian statue of Cosimo I de' Medici in Florence, and the equestrian statue of Phillip III in Madrid, were completed by his studio assistant Pietro Tacca.

Giambologna provided as well as many sculptures for garden grottos and fountains in the Boboli Gardens of Florence and at the Villa di Pratolino, and the bronze doors of Pisa Cathedral. He created the bronze sea-horses and some other sculptures for Bartolomeo Ammannati's Fountain of Neptune, Florence.

For the grotto of the Villa di Castello he sculpted a series of studies of individual animals, from life, which may now be viewed at the Bargello. Small bronze reductions of many of his sculptures were prized by connoisseurs at the time and ever since, for Giambologna's reputation has never suffered eclipse.

Giambologna was an important influence on later sculptors through his pupils Adriaen de Vries and Pietro Francavilla who left his atelier for Paris in 1601, as well as Pierre Puget who spread Giambologna's influence throughout Northern Europe, and in Italy on Pietro Tacca, who assumed Giambologna's workshop in Florence, and in Rome on Gian Lorenzo Bernini and Alessandro Algardi.

== Gallery ==
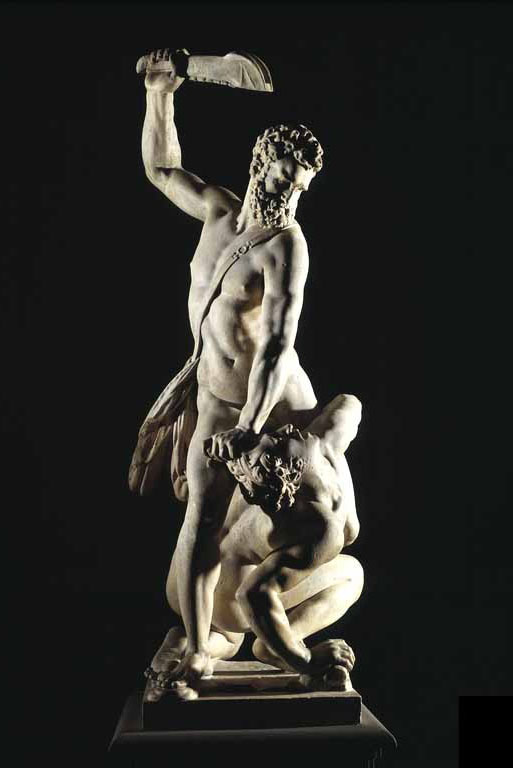
Samson Slaying a Philistine, about 1562, V&A Museum London

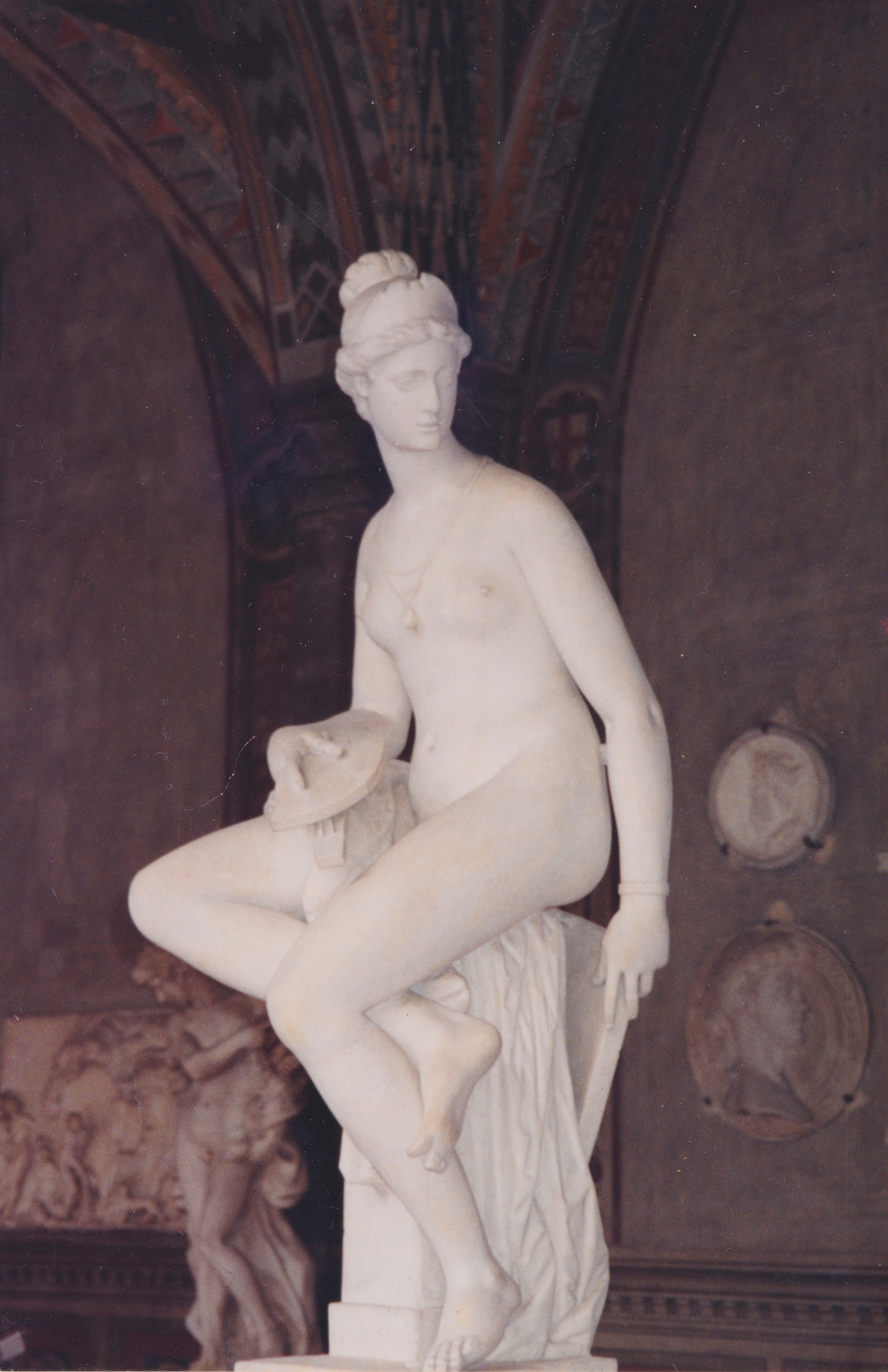
Architettura, Bargello, 1565, Florence. This sculpture exemplifies the long limbs of Giambologna's influential ideal female type.

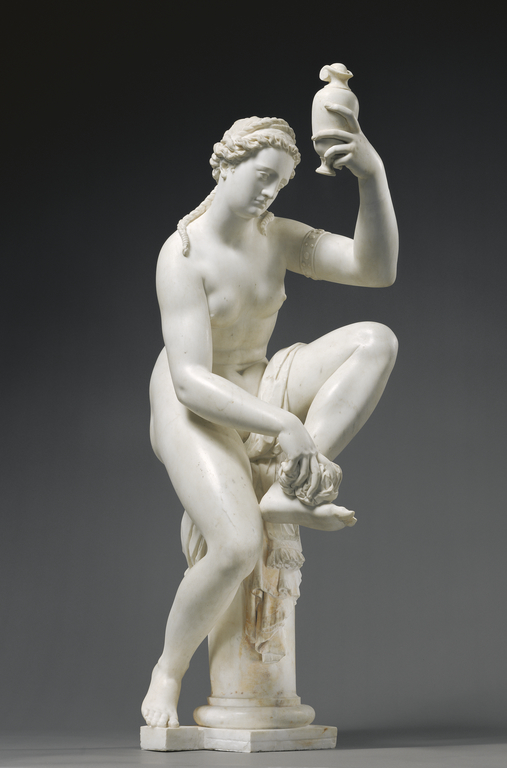
Female Figure, 1571–1573, J. Paul Getty Museum, Los Angeles

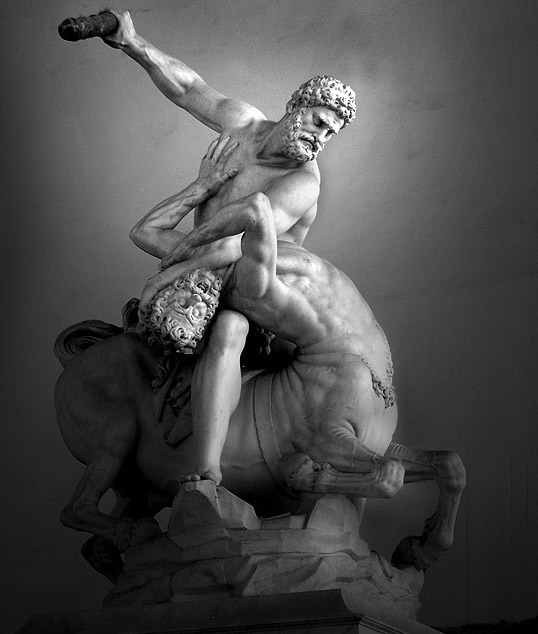
Hercules and Nessus, 1599, Loggia dei Lanzi, Florence

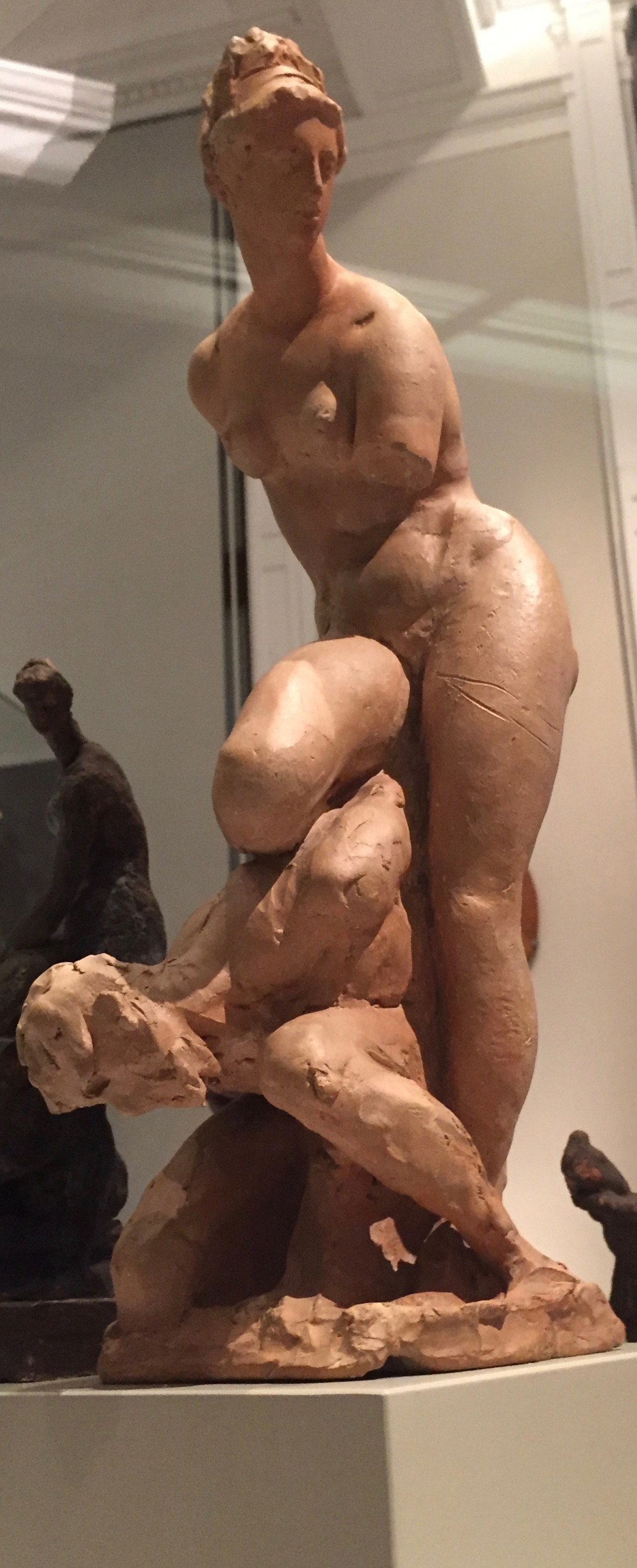
Florence Triumphant over Pisa, 1565, Bargello, Florence (maquette in clay, V&A Museum, London)

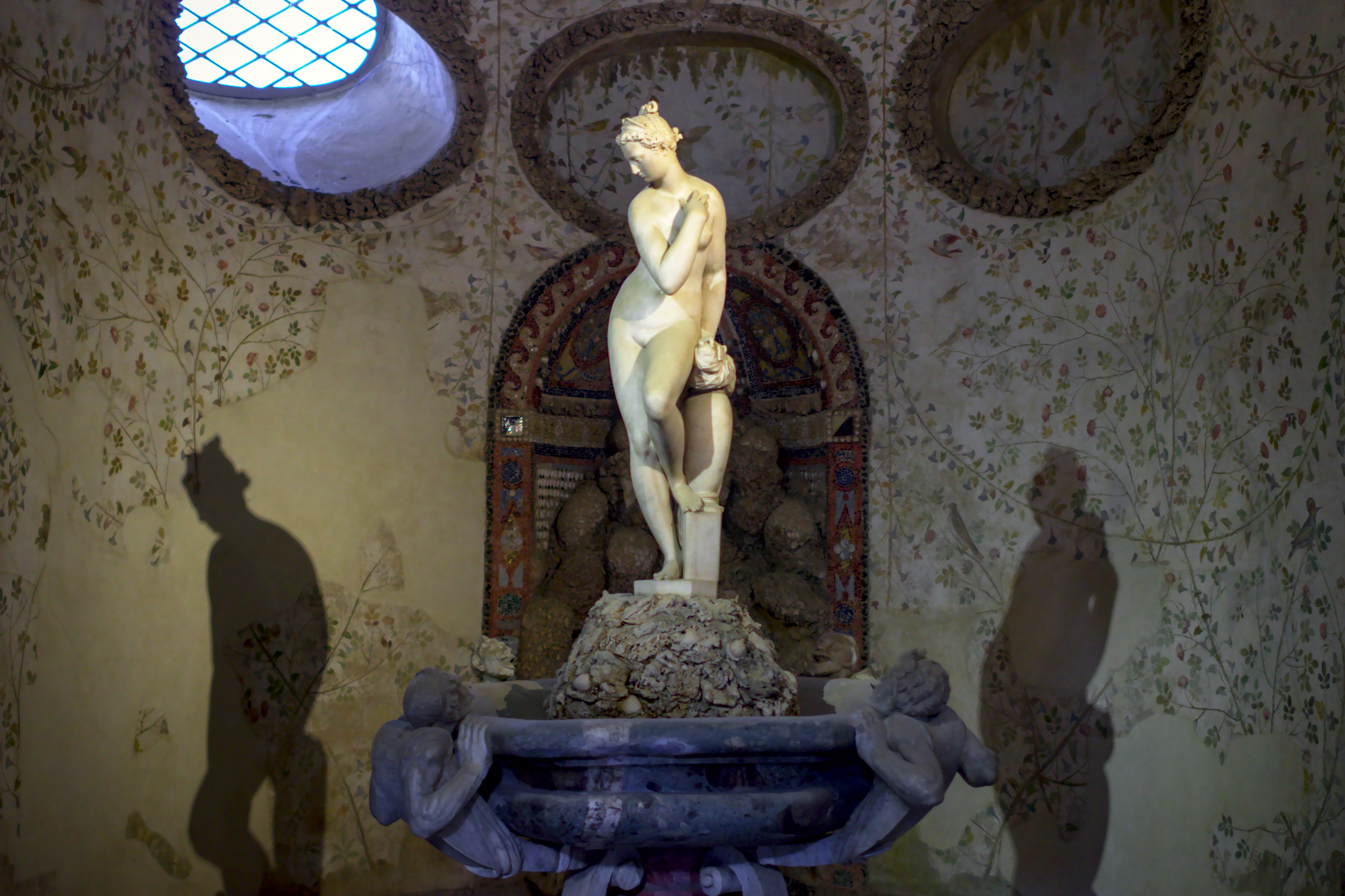
Bathing Venus, 1573, Buontalenti Grotto, Boboli Gardens, Florence

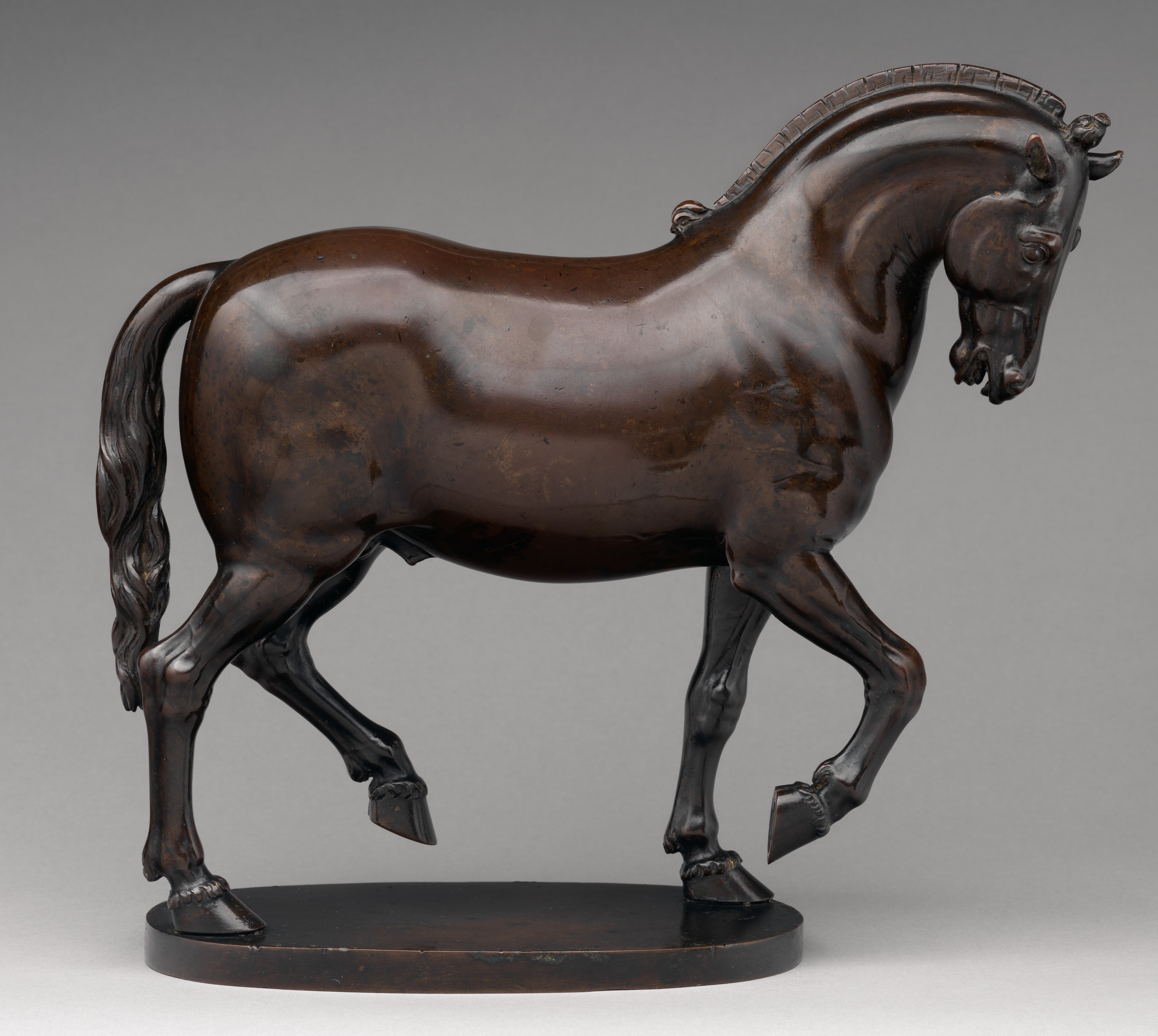
Horse by Giambologna (workshop), probably around 1590. 10 inches (25 cm) high.

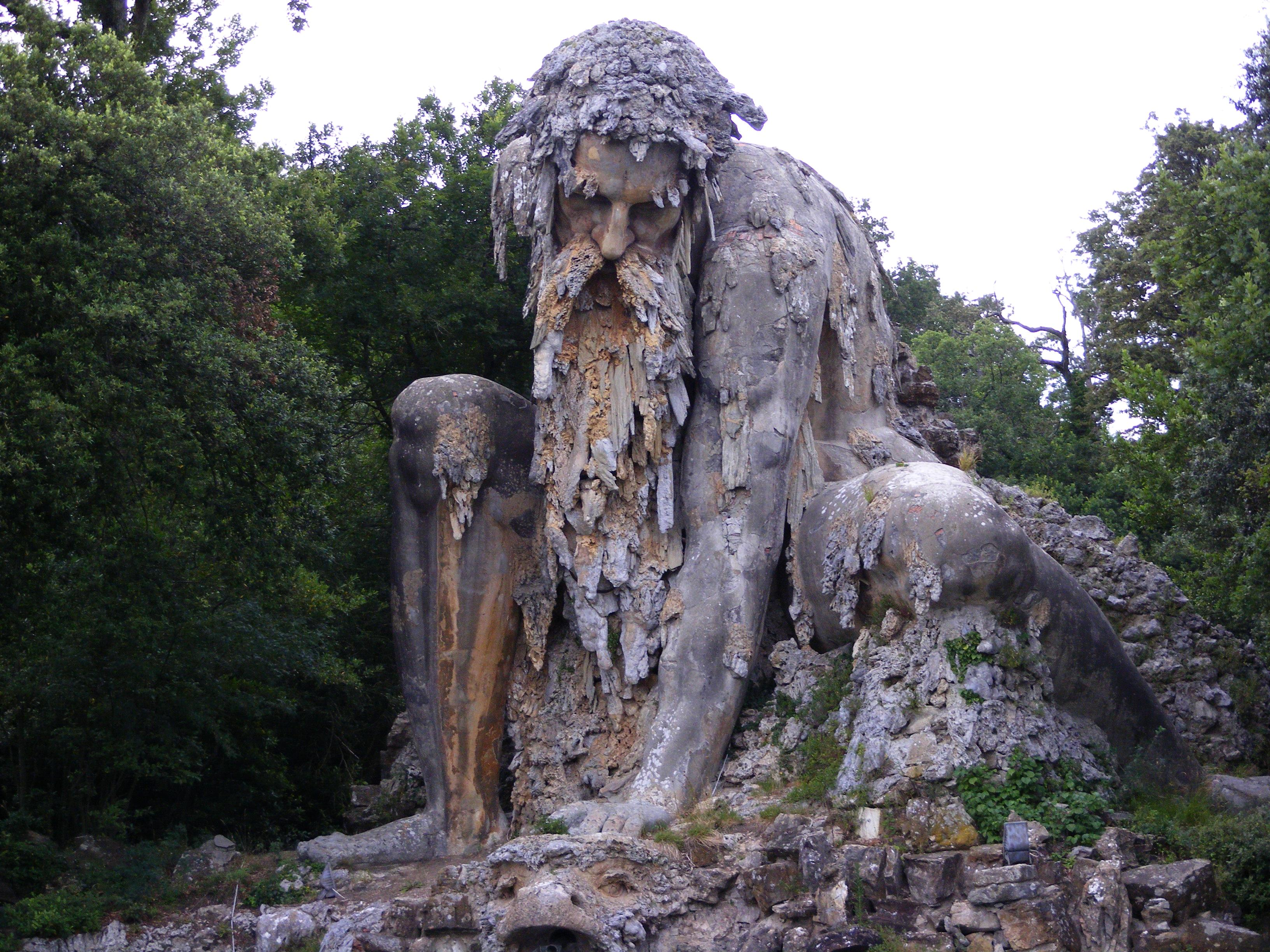
Apennine Colossus in the Villa di Pratolino
