= Marco Spallanzani =

Marco Spallanzani is an economic historian who previously taught economic history at the University of Florence. For some time he has conducted research in the Tuscan archives on the production and trade of goods considered to be ‘minor arts,’ examining, through various products from the east, the moment of their importation from the lands of Islam or faraway China. He has published articles on the presence of these much sought-after furnishings (in particular Chinese porcelain, Italian Maiolica and Islamic metal) by the Medici and the most important families of the 14th–16th centuries. He has also edited an edition of Medici family inventories of the quattrocento (15th century). In 1982, he set up the Islamic Hall of the Bargello art museum in Florence.

== Published works ==
Spallanzani’s work has mostly been in Italian, though he occasionally publishes in English as well - as for example his most recent book, which is on Oriental rugs. His publications include, (but are not limited to (SPECIFY otherwise it will be always possible to imagine a quantity without a limit)):

- Ceramiche alla Corte dei Medici nel Cinquecento. Modena: Franco Cosimo Panini, 1994.
- Ceramiche orientali a Firenze nel Rinaschimento. Florence, 1978.
- “Ceramiche nelle raccolte medicee da Cosimo I a Ferdinando I.” In Le arti del principato mediceo. Candaece Adelson, et al., ed. Florence, 1980, pp. 95–115.
- “Medici Porcelain in the Collection of the Last Grand-Duke.” The Burlington Magazine, 132, no. 1046 (May 1990), pp. 316–320.
- Oriental Rugs in Renaissance Florence. Florence: S.P.E.S., 2007.
