= Bargello =

Art museum in Florence, Italy

Coordinates: 43°46′13.34″N 11°15′30.06″E

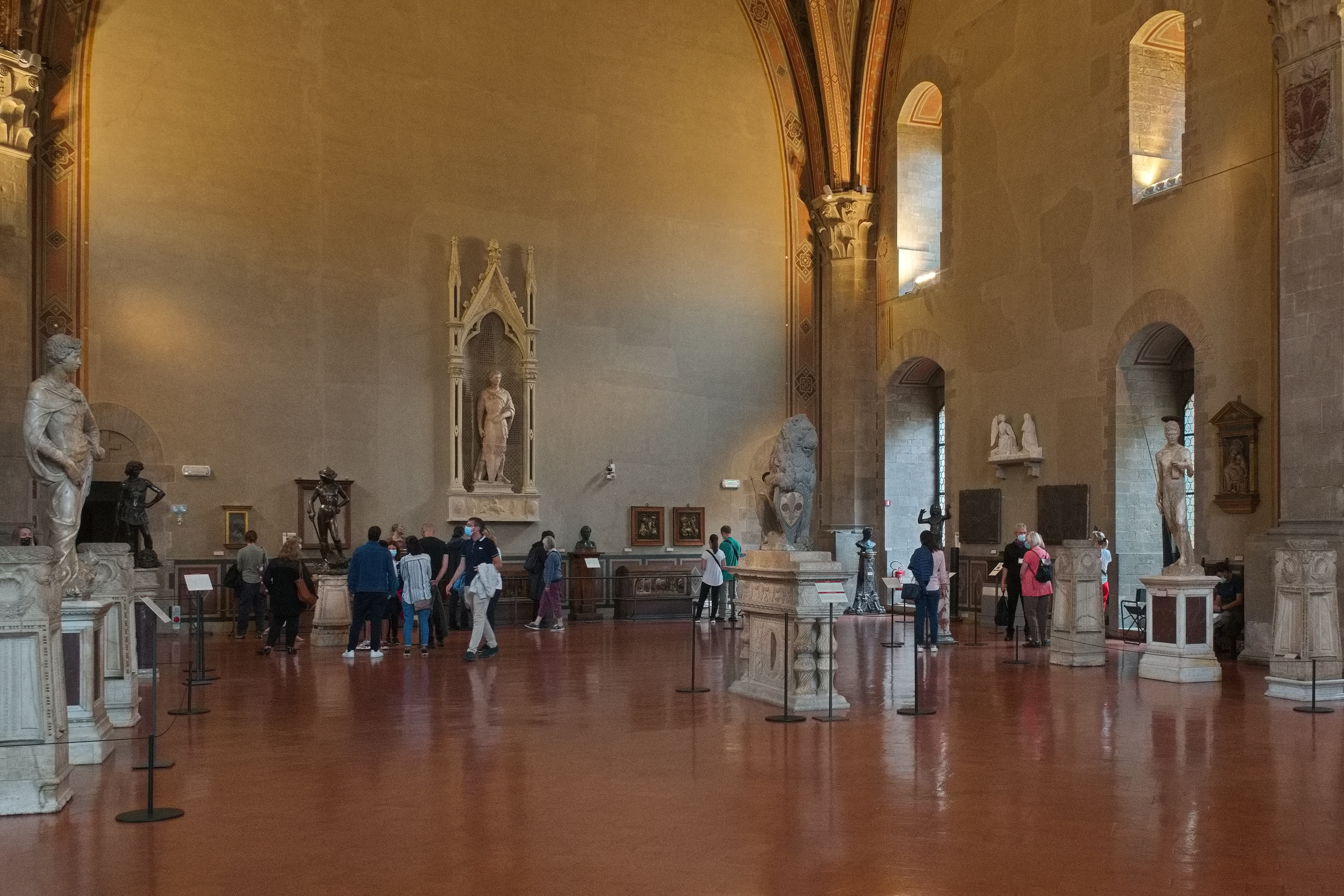
The Donatello room

The Bargello, also known as the Palazzo del Bargello or Palazzo del Popolo ("Palace of the People"), is a former public building and police headquarters, later a prison, in Florence, Italy. Mostly built in the 13th century, since 1865 it has housed the Museo Nazionale del Bargello, a national art museum.

It is the primary national collection for Italian Renaissance sculpture, of which its collection of Florentine works is unequalled, and for the decorative arts of Florence, especially from the Renaissance period. There are also works from earlier and later periods.

The medieval building is relatively well preserved, and includes the Cappella della Maddalena (Magdalen Chapel) with extensive but damaged frescos by Giotto, including a full-length portrait of Dante.

In 2023 it was the 12th most visited museum in Italy, with 610,203 visitors; it generally lacks the long queues to enter the Uffizi.

== Name ==
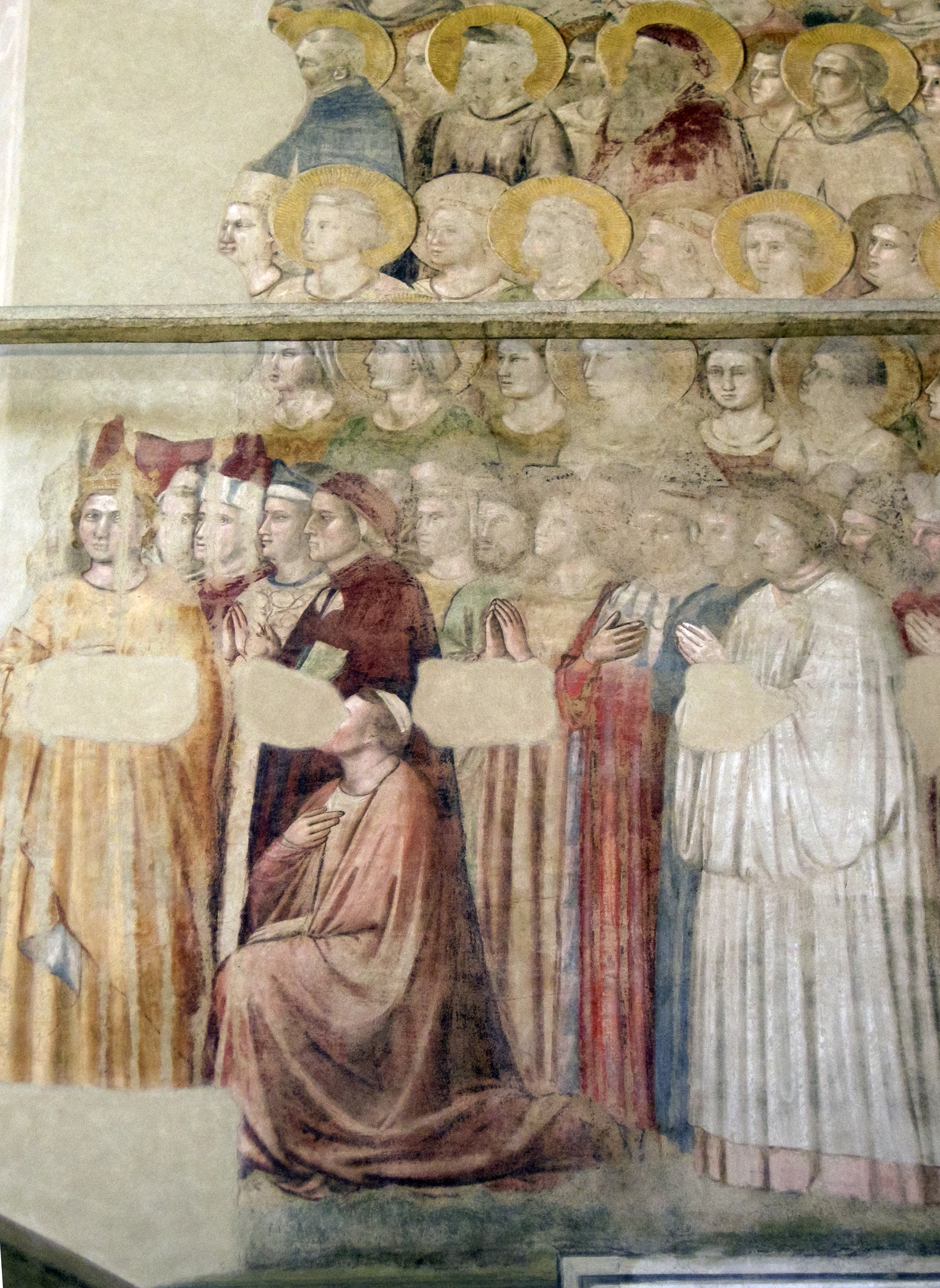
Giotto, section of chapel frescos, with Dante standing in red.

The word bargello appears to come from the late Latin bargillus (from Gothic bargi and German burg), meaning "castle" or "fortified tower". During the Italian Middle Ages it was the name given to a military captain in charge of keeping peace and justice (hence "Captain of justice") during riots and uproars. In Florence he was usually hired from a foreign city to prevent any appearance of favoritism on the part of the Captain. The position could be compared with that of a current Chief of police. The name Bargello was extended to the building which was the office of the captain.

== History ==
Construction began in 1255. The palace was built to house first the Capitano del Popolo and later, in 1261, the 'podestà', the highest magistrate of the Florence City Council. This Palazzo del Podestà, as it was originally called, is the oldest public building in Florence. This austere crenellated building served as model for the construction of the Palazzo Vecchio. In 1574, the Medici dispensed with the function of the Podestà and housed the bargello, the police chief of Florence, in this building, hence its name. In 1479 Bernardo Bandini Baroncelli, one of the movers of the Pazzi conspiracy against the Medici family was hanged from the building, an event witnessed and sketched by Leonardo da Vinci.

It was employed as a prison; executions took place in the Bargello's courtyard until they were abolished by Grand Duke Peter Leopold in 1786, but it remained the headquarters of the Florentine police until 1859. After an interval, it then became a national museum.

The original two-storey structure was built alongside the Volognana Tower in 1256. The third storey, which can be identified by the smaller blocks used to construct it, was added after the fire of 1323. The building is designed around an open courtyard dating from 1280-1285. An external staircase leading to the second floor was added between 1345-1367 under master builder Neri di Fioravante. An open well is found in the centre of the courtyard.

After centuries of modifications to its architecture, the building was restored to its original form between 1858 and 1865. The Bargello opened as a national museum (Museo Nazionale del Bargello) in 1865, displaying the largest Italian collection of Gothic and Renaissance sculptures (14–17th century). Administratively, the museum heads a group, the Musei del Bargello, with four smaller museums in Florence: the Medici Chapels, Orsanmichele, Palazzo Davanzati, and Casa Martelli.

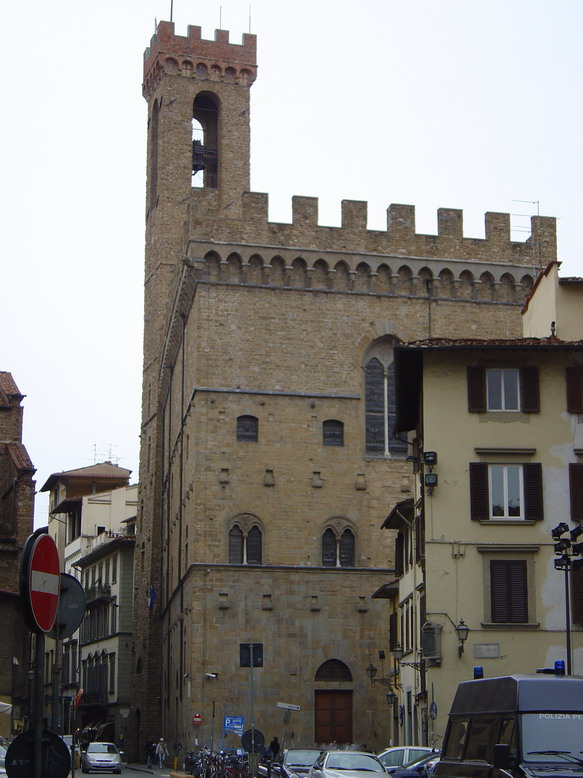
Exterior

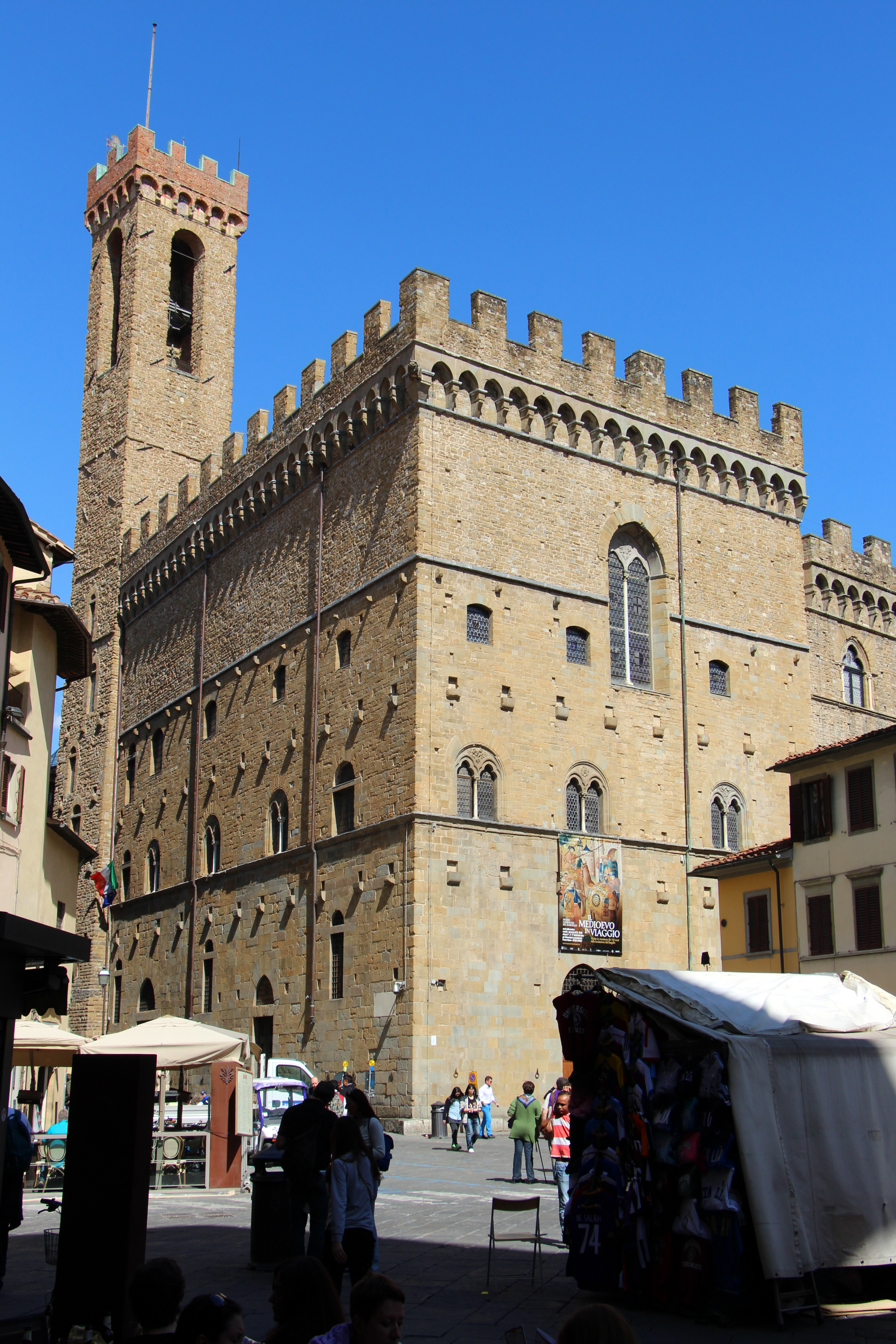
another view

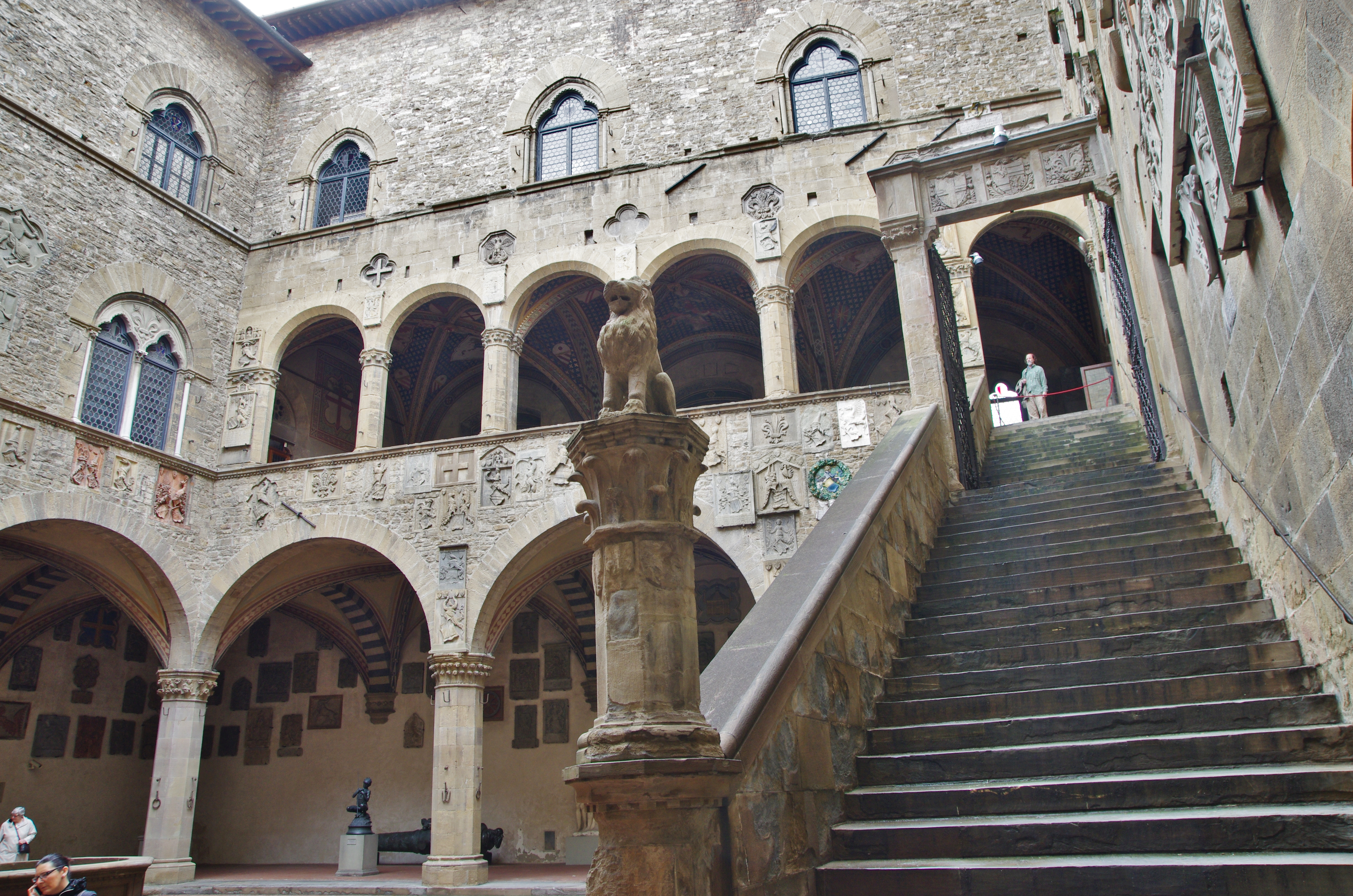
Stairs and inner courtyard

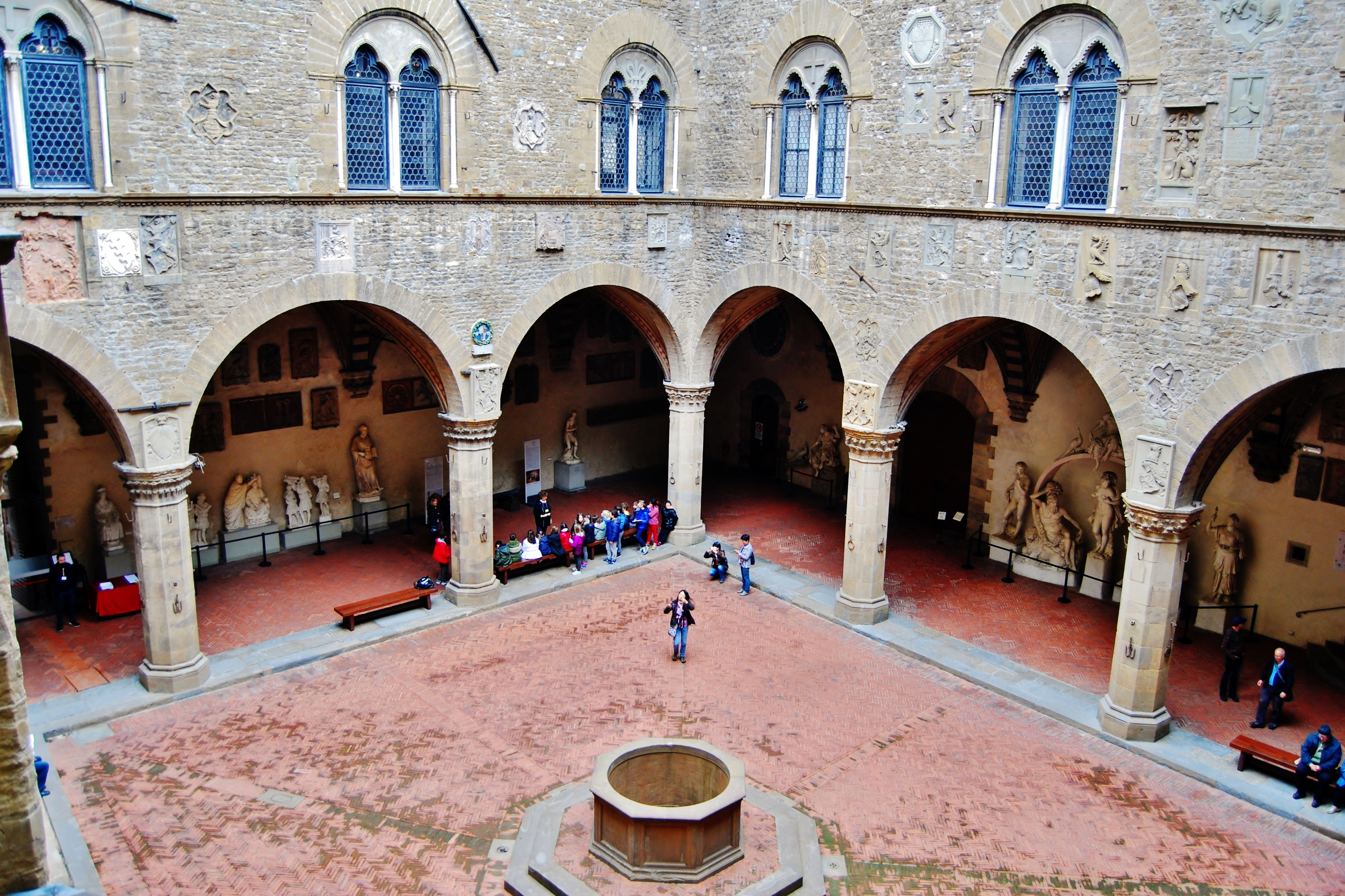
Courtyard

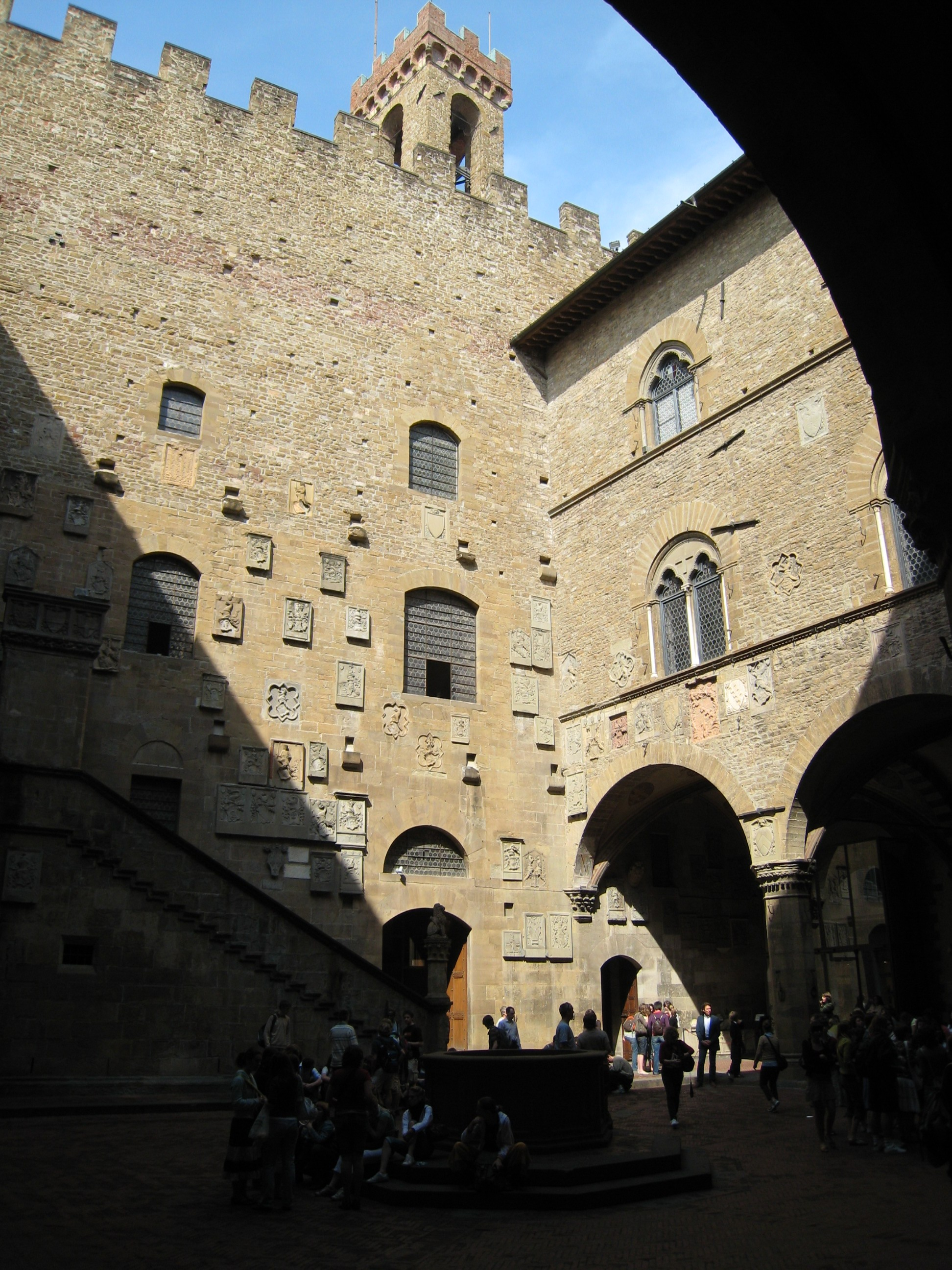
Inner courtyard

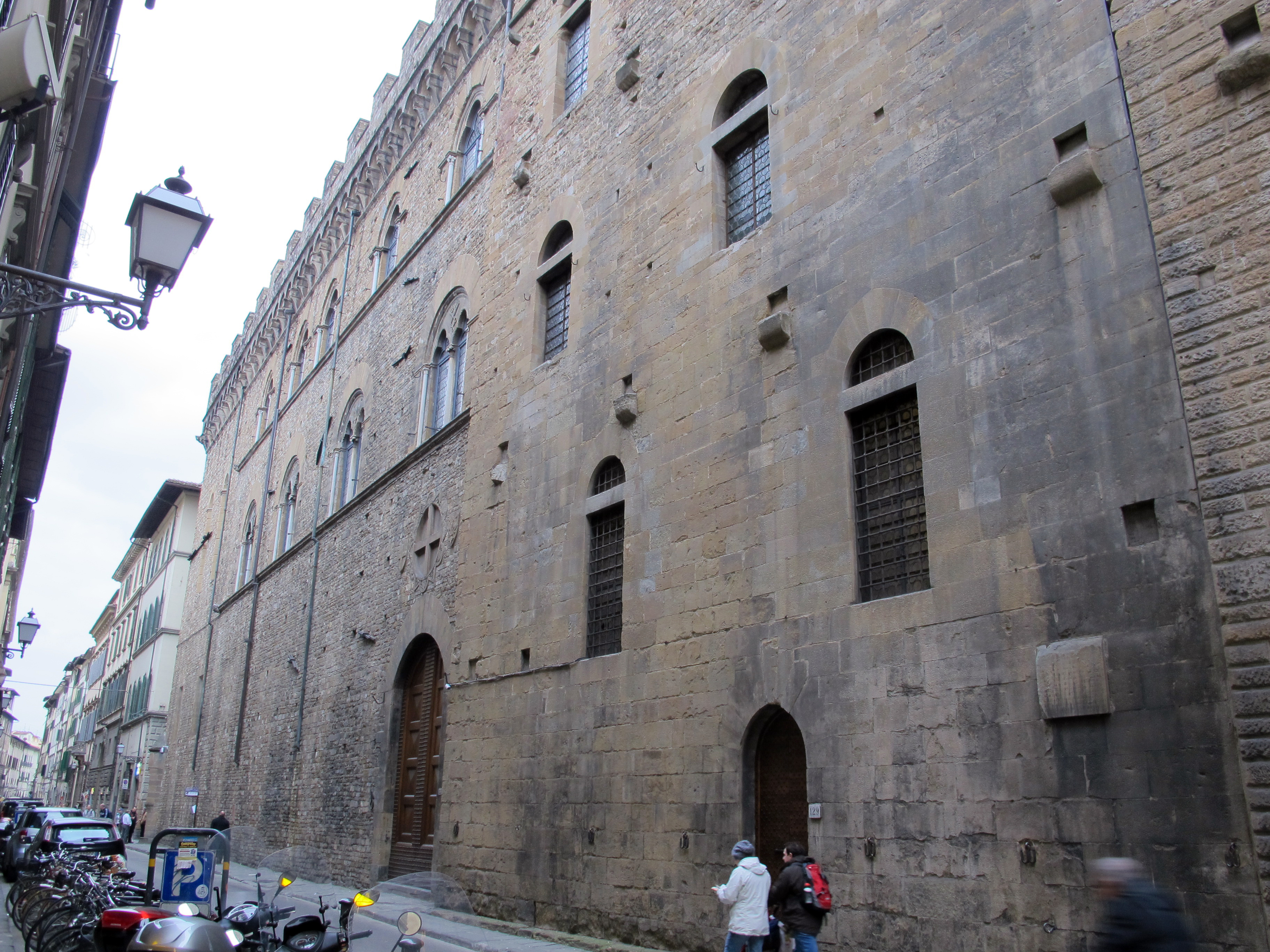
Rear, on via ghibellina

== Collection ==
=== Sculpture ===
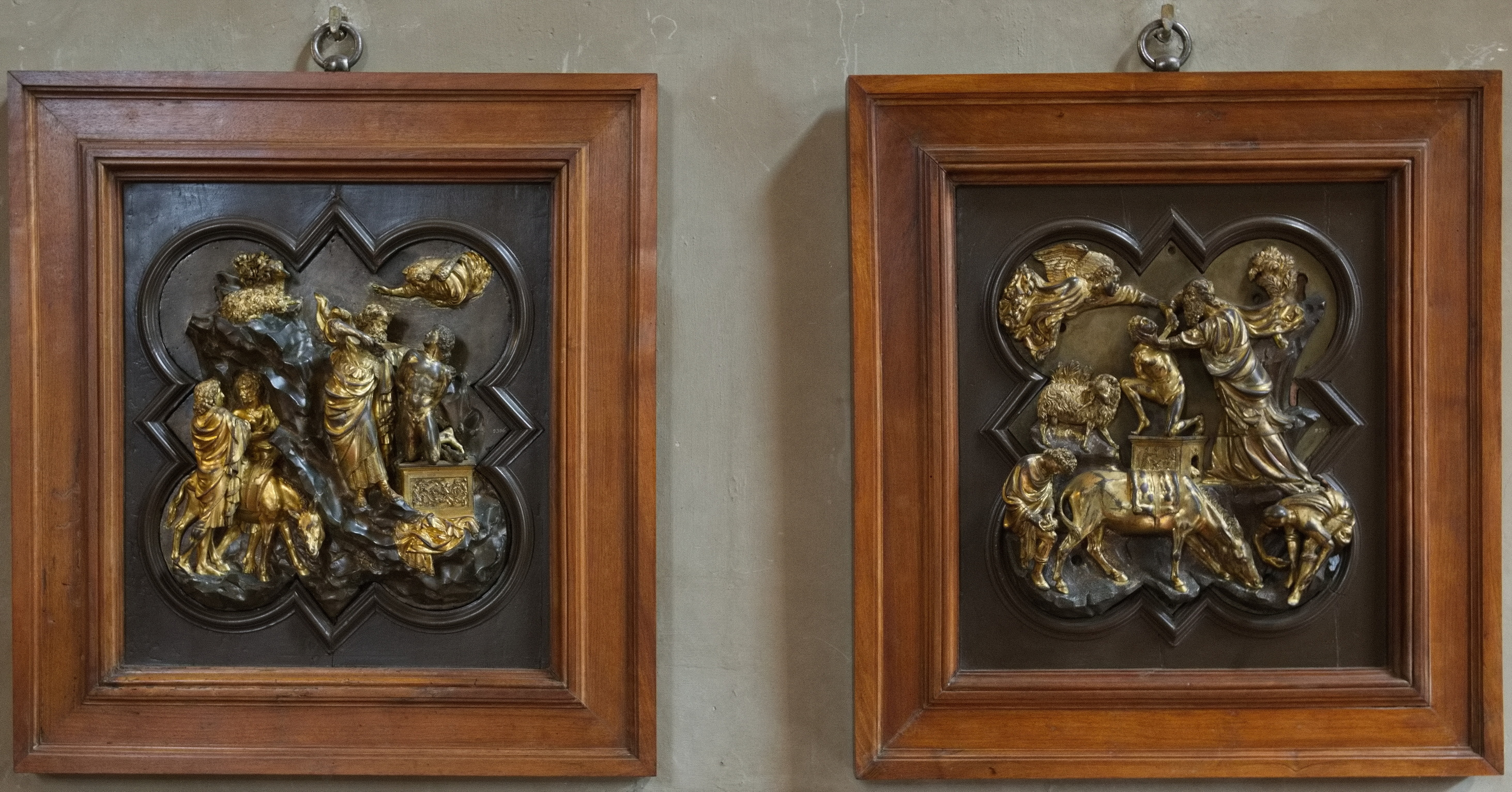
Sacrifice of Isaac, the competition reliefs by Ghiberti and Brunelleschi for the Florence Baptistery doors (1401/2)

There is a good selection of medieval sculpture. The museum has both the modelli of the finalists' designs for The Sacrifice of Isaac (Sacrificio di Isacco), for the contest for the second set of doors of the Florence Baptistery in 1401. That by Lorenzo Ghiberti won, with Filippo Brunelleschi's the runner-up.

The most famous sculptures are several by both Michelangelo and Donatello. Large sculptures by Michelangelo are his Bacchus, Pitti Tondo (a Madonna and Child), Brutus and David-Apollo. A wood Crucifix attributed to his early years was acquired in 2008.

Its collection includes both Donatello's bronze and marble statues of David, as well as his Amore-Attis, Saint George, with its relief for the base of Saint George Freeing the Princess, and his heraldic Marzocco. Other sculptures include Jacopo Sansovino's Bacchus, the David and Dama col mazzolino by Andrea del Verrocchio.

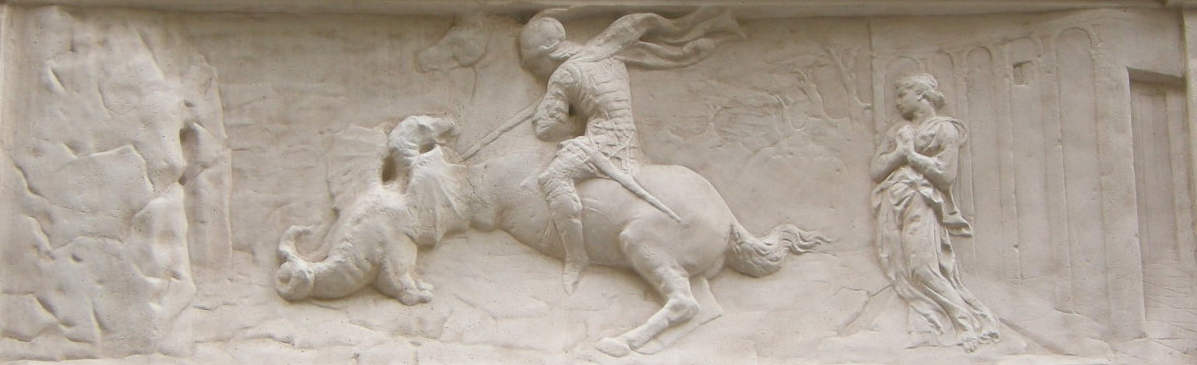
Donatello, St. George Freeing the Princess, the first relievo stiacciato, 1412

Other works of sculpture include several by the Della Robbia family workshop. and by Antonio Rossellino, Bartolomeo Ammannati, Bertoldo di Giovanni, Baccio Bandinelli, and most other Florentine masters of the period. Benvenuto Cellini is represented by his bronze bust of Cosimo I.

The final phase of the Renaissance is represented by Giambologna's marble Florence Triumphant over Pisa, Architecture, The Dwarf Morgante Riding a Sea Monster, and his Mercury. The courtyard and the arcades around it have been used to display numerous reliefs and other works.

There are a few works from the Baroque period, notably Gianlorenzo Bernini's 1636-7 Bust of Costanza Bonarelli. Vincenzo Gemito's Pescatore ("fisherboy"), is a popular 19th-century sculpture.

Sculpture (large)

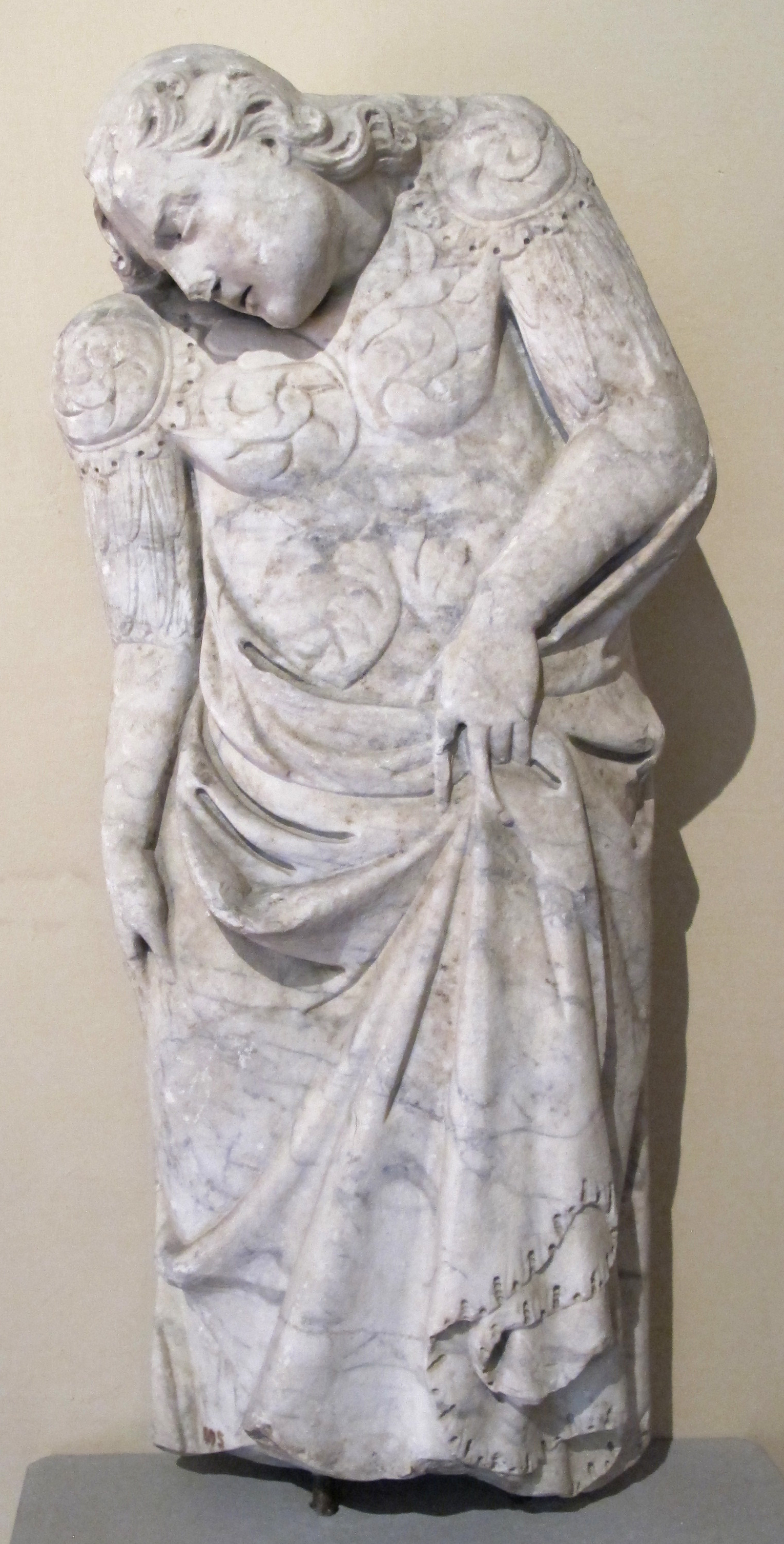
Allegorical Caryatid, Tino di Camaino, 1318/19

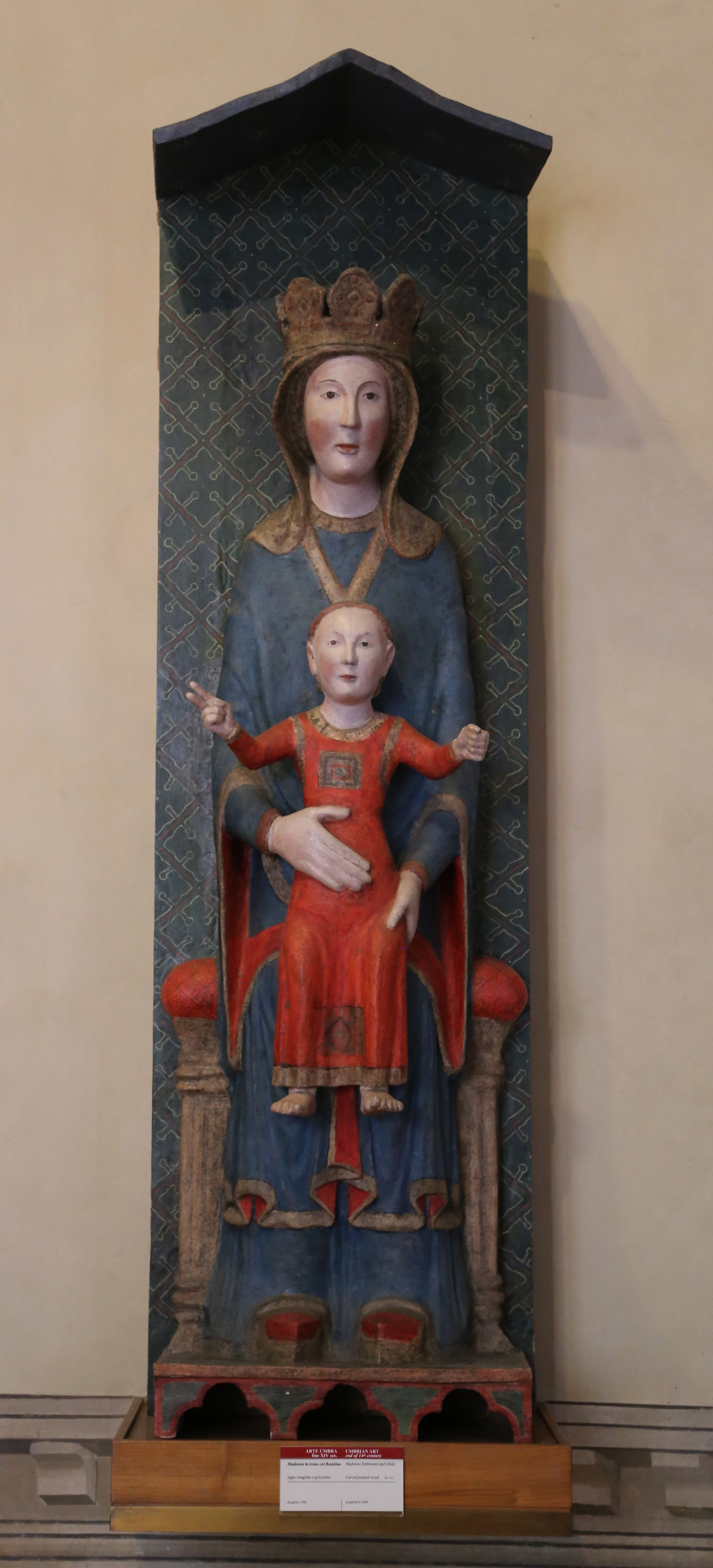
Madonna Enthroned, Umbria, 14th ct.

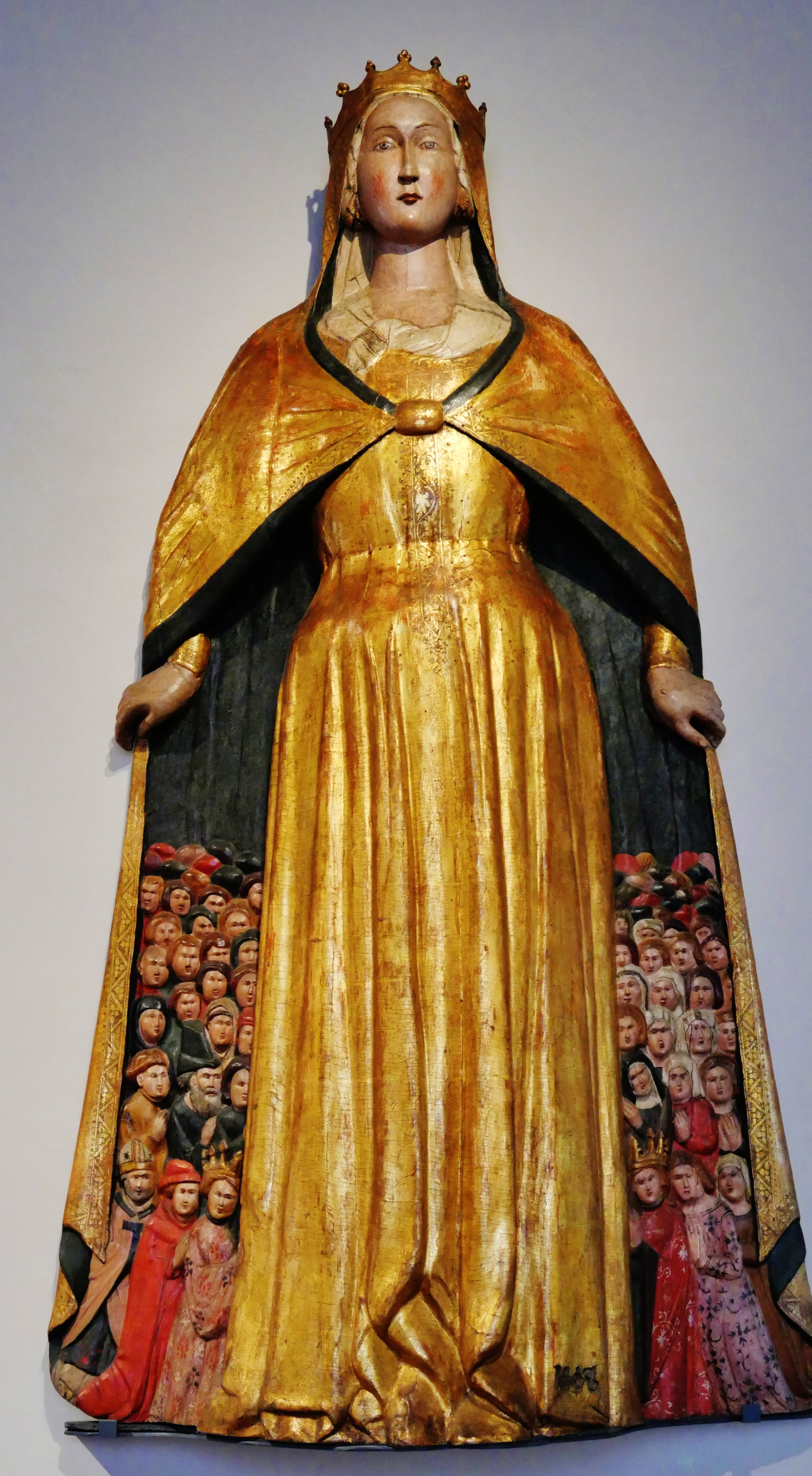
Umbrian Virgin of Mercy (15. ct.) in the Bruzzichelli Hall

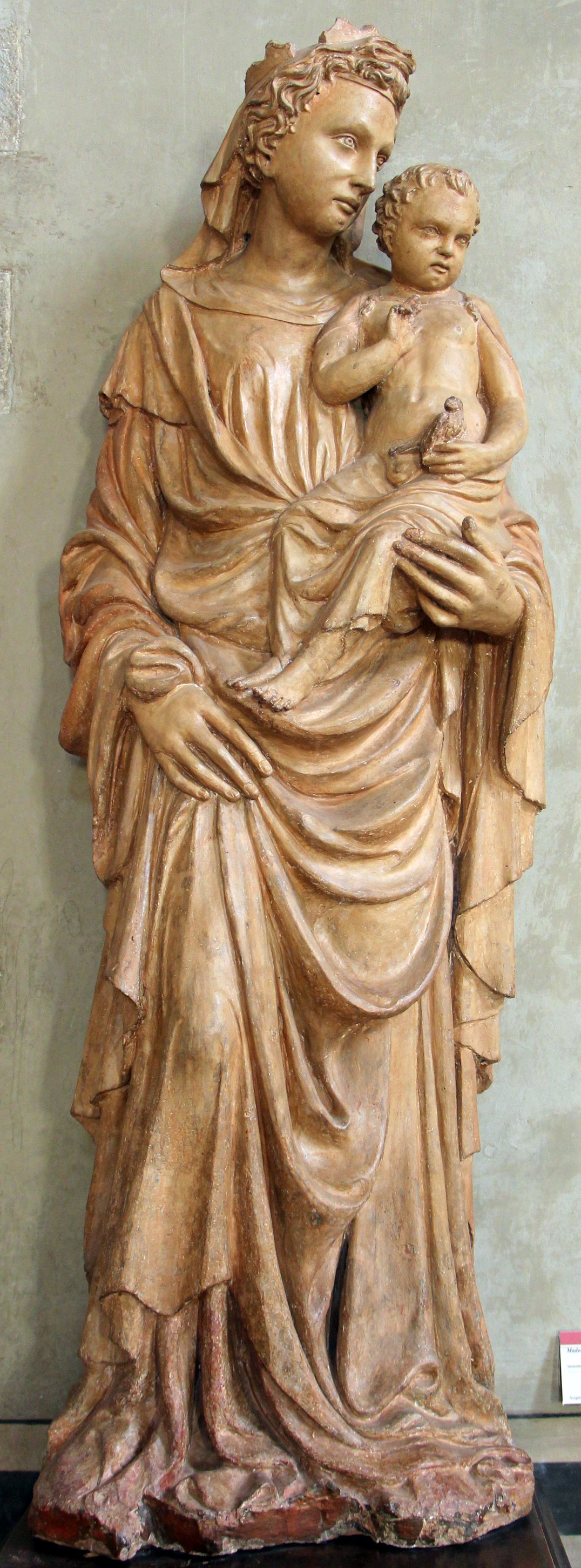
Virgin and Child, Michele da Firenze, 1420–50

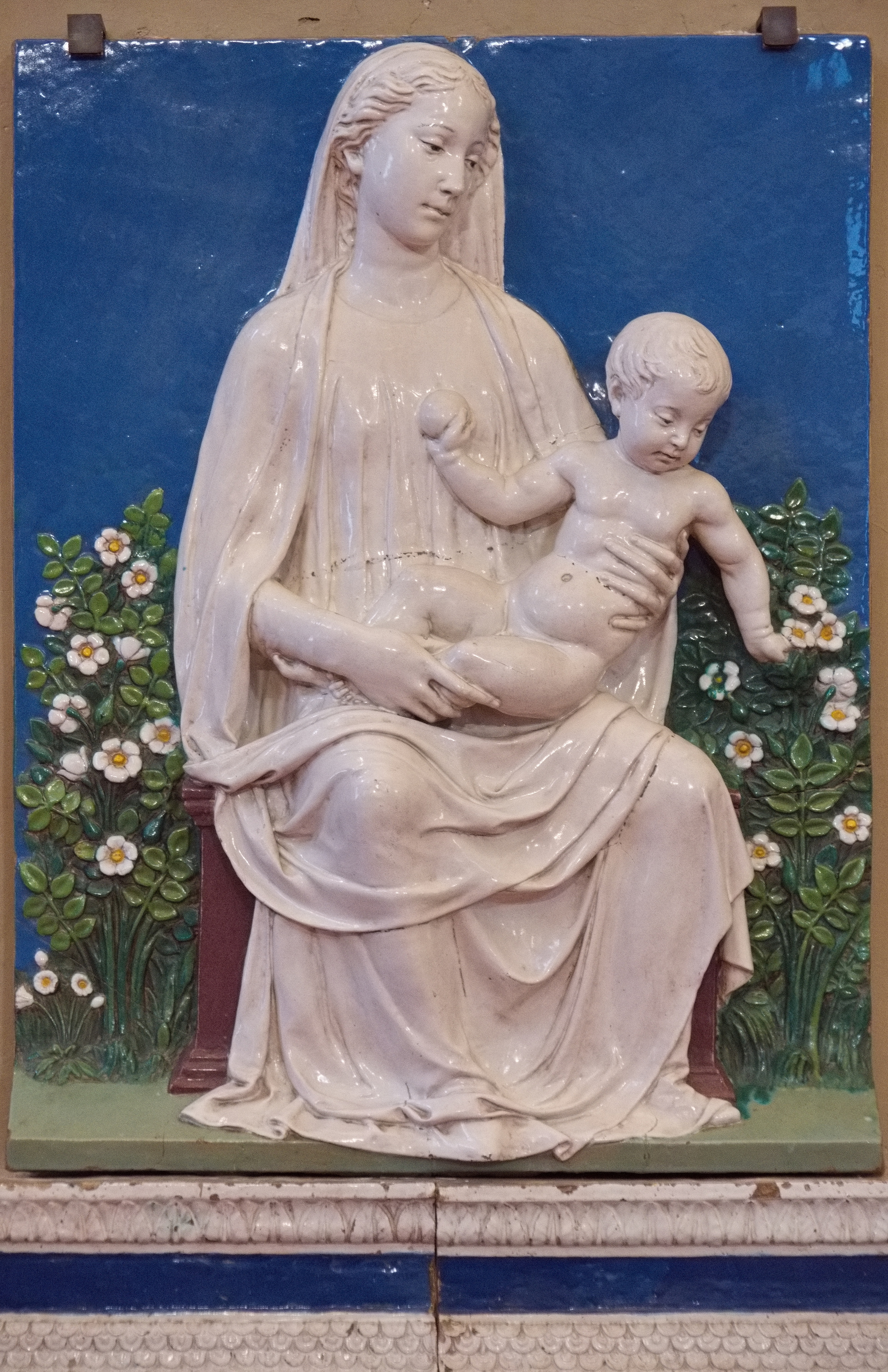
Luca della Robbia, Madonna of the Rosebush, 1450–60

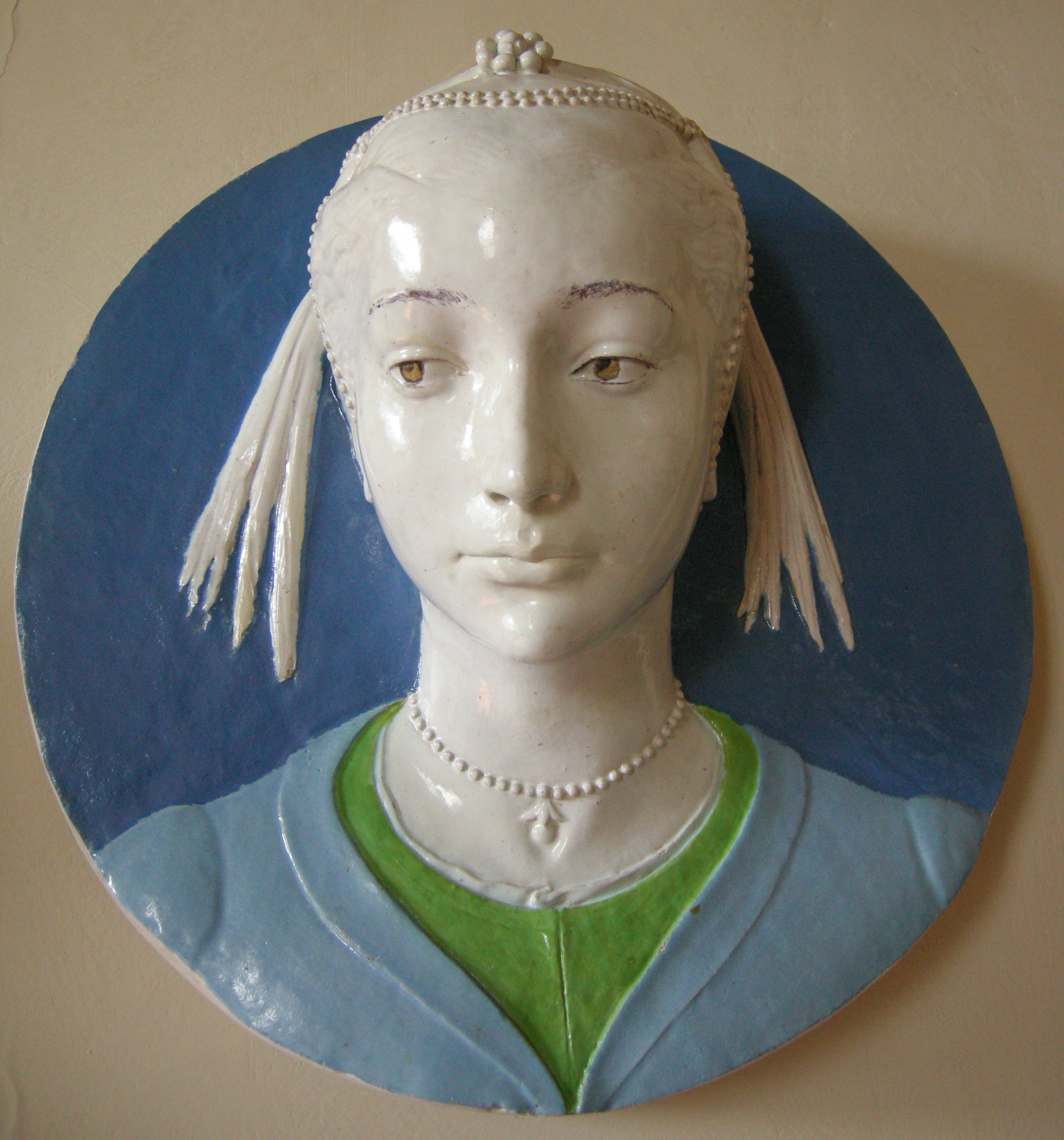
Andrea della Robbia, Portrait of a Womman, 1465–70

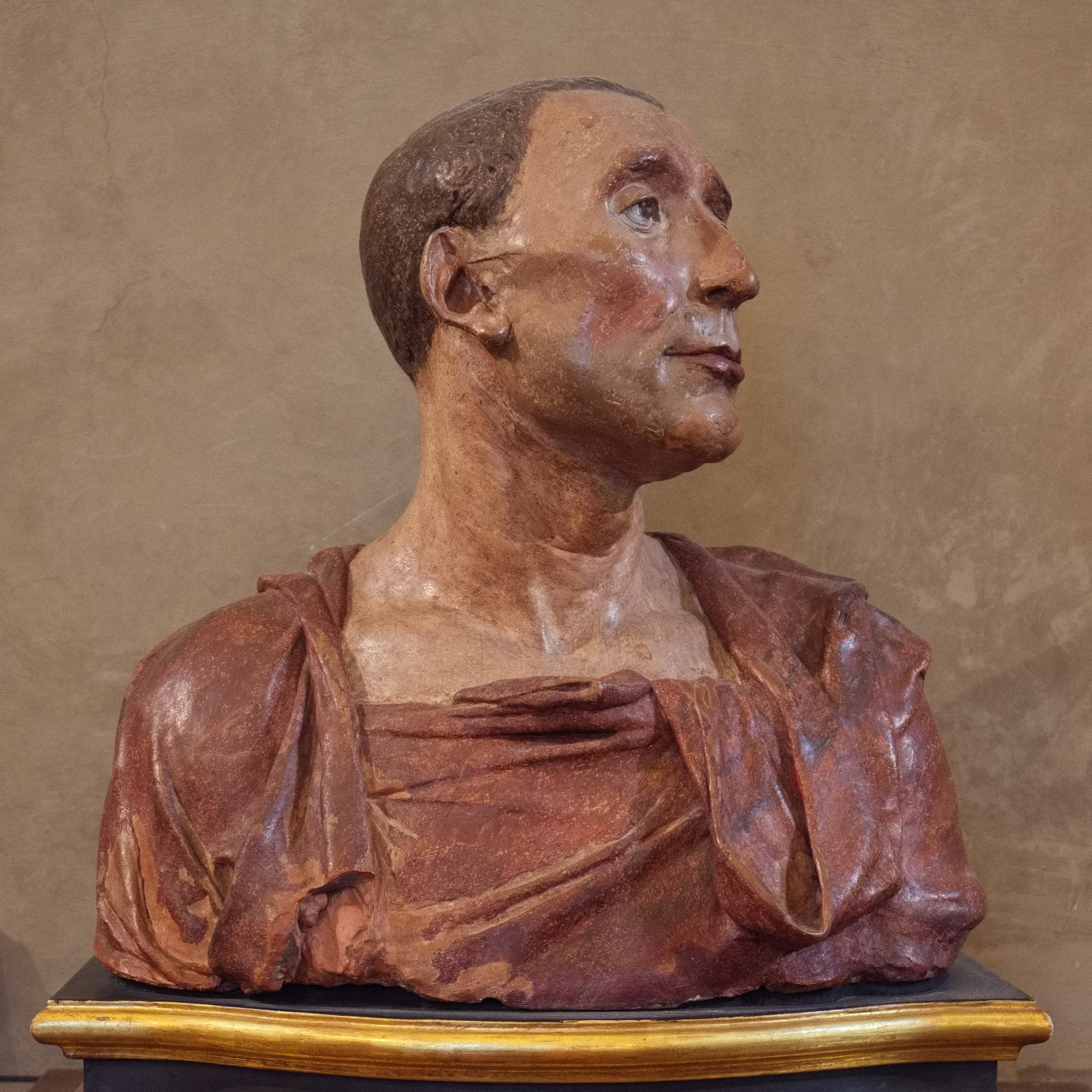
Niccolo da Uzzano, probably by Desiderio da Settignano (not Donatello as once thought), painted terracotta, c. 1450

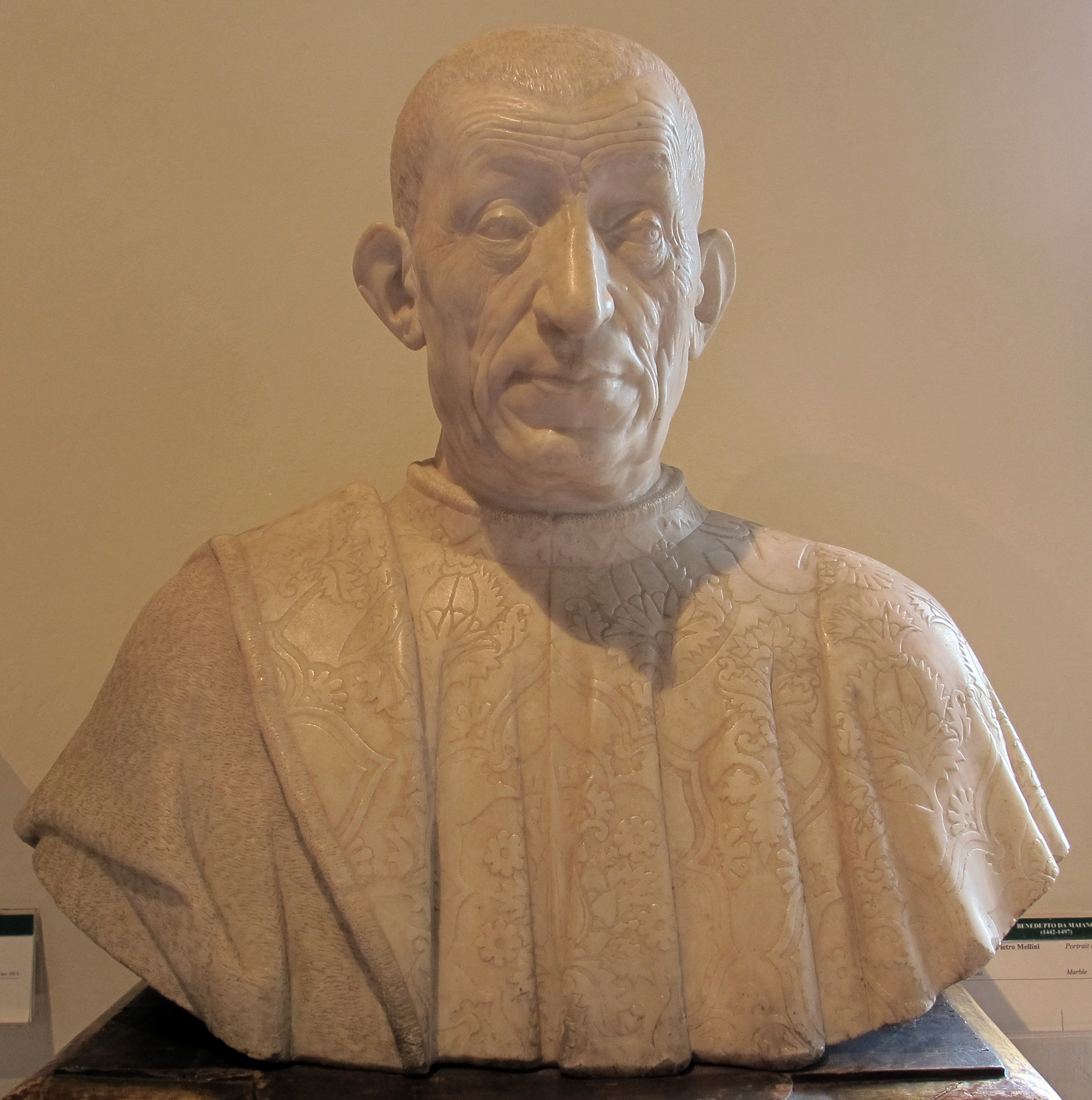
Bust of Pietro Melllini by Benedetto da Maiano, 1474

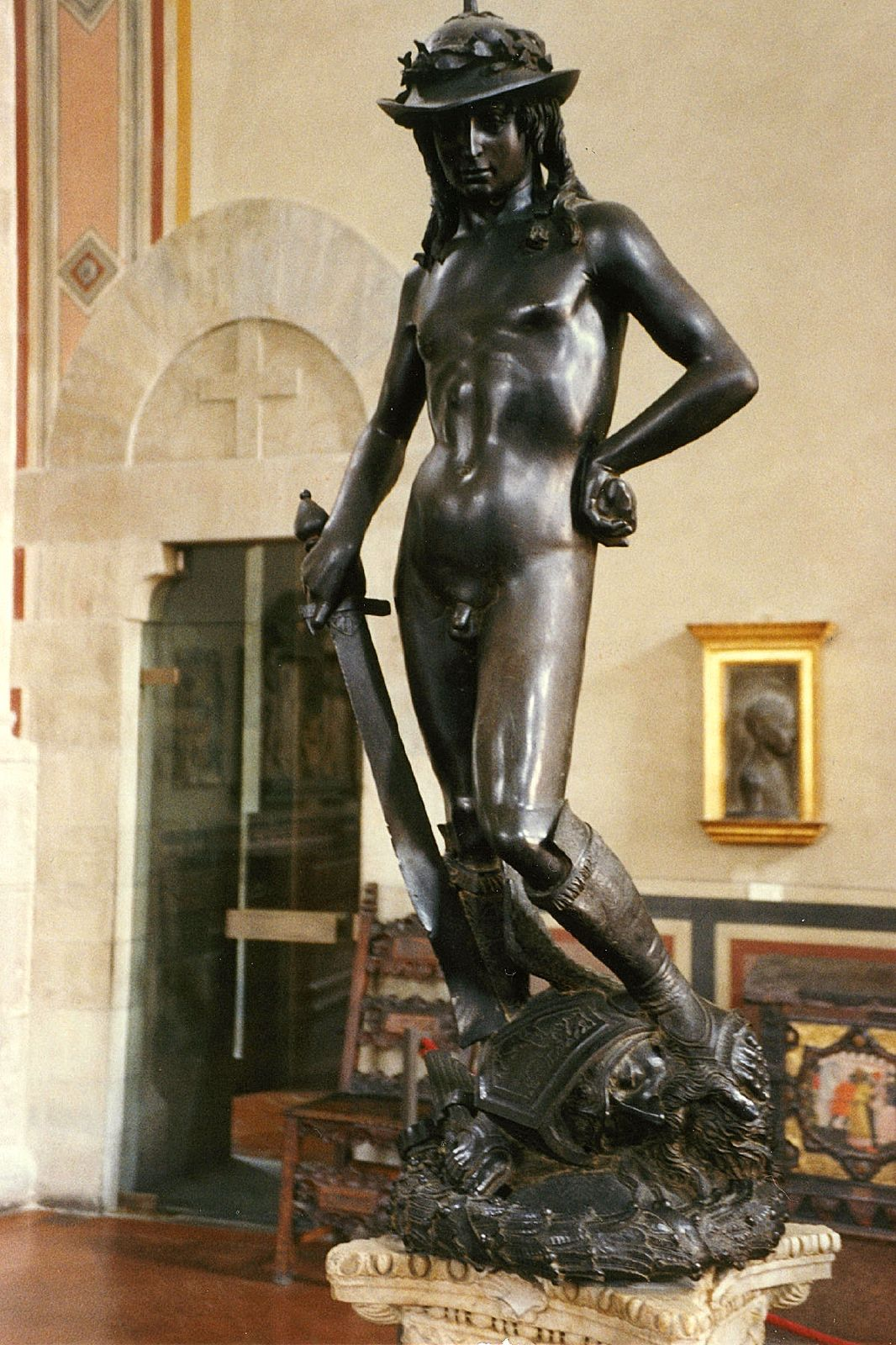
The bronze David by Donatello (1440s)

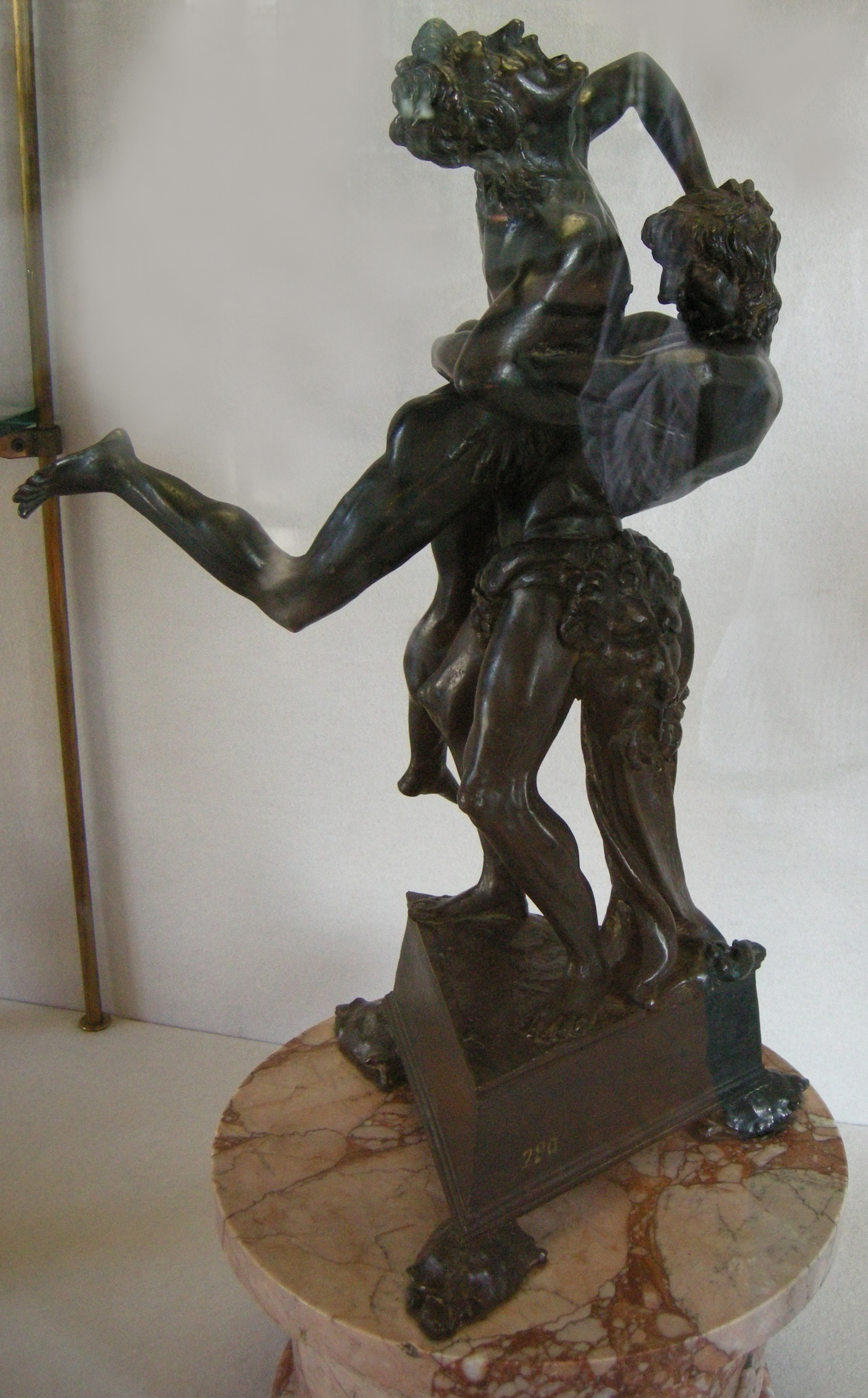
Antonio del Pollaiolo, Hercules and Antaeus, c. 1478

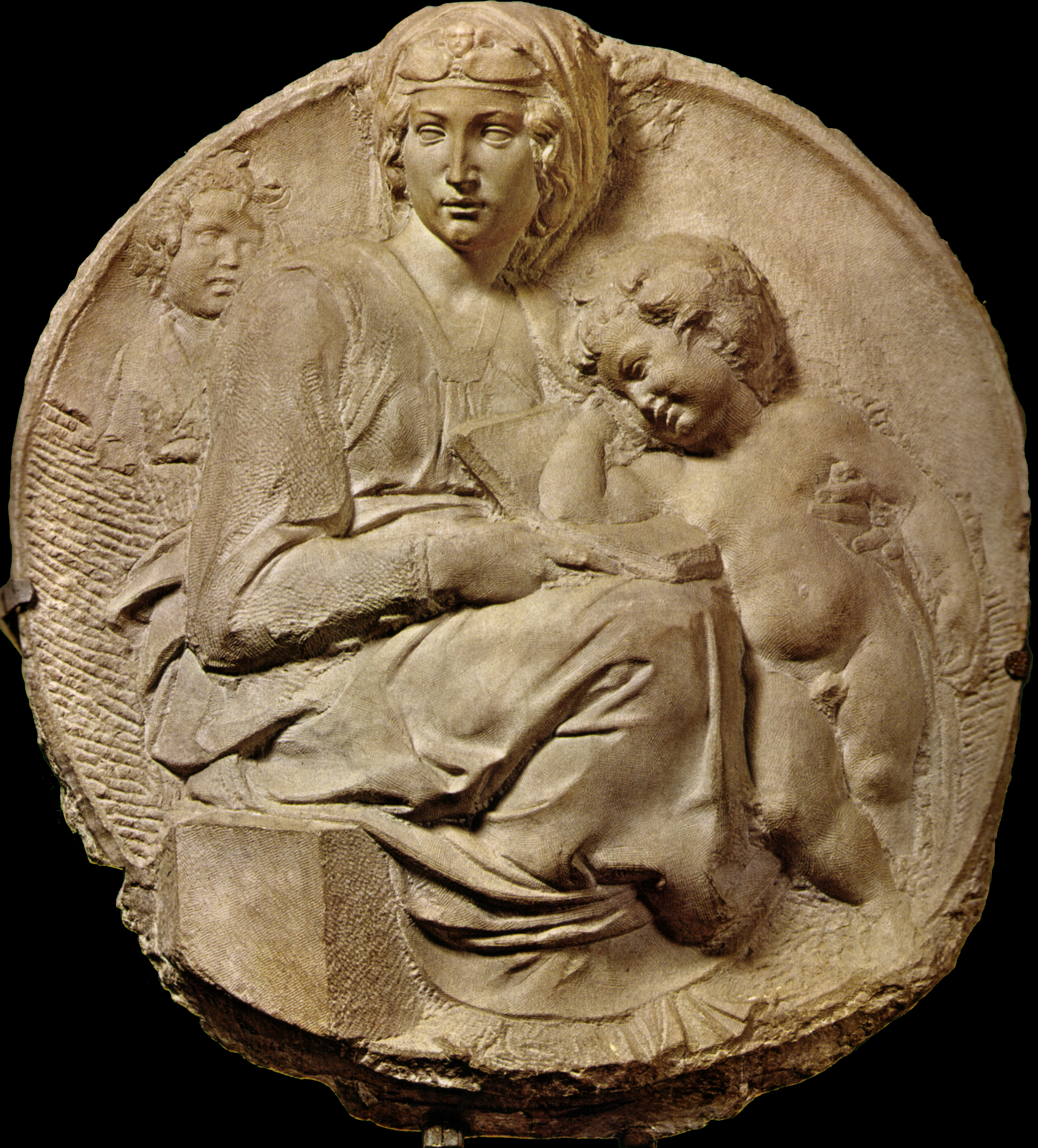
Michelangelo's Pitti Tondo, 1503/04

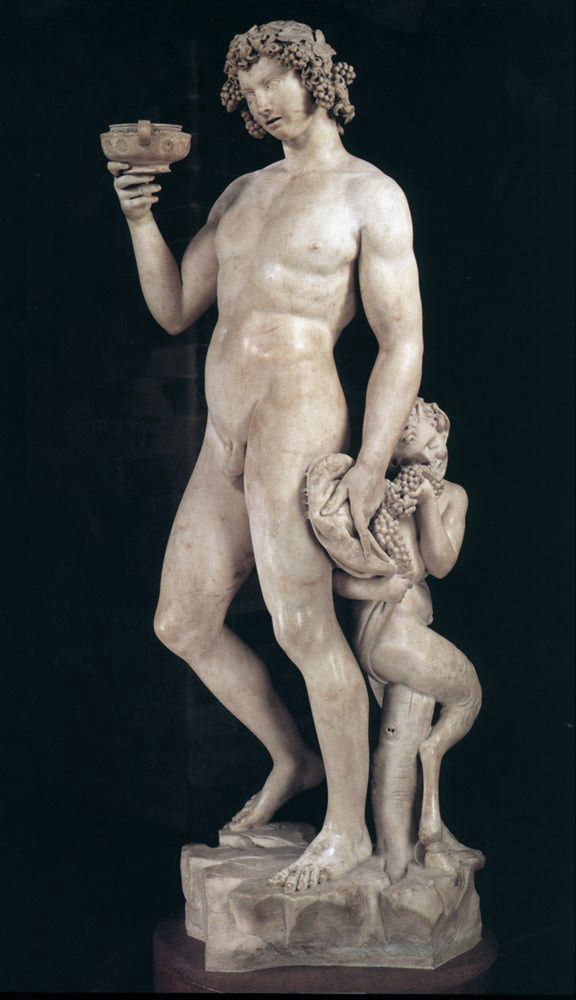
Bacchus, Michelangelo

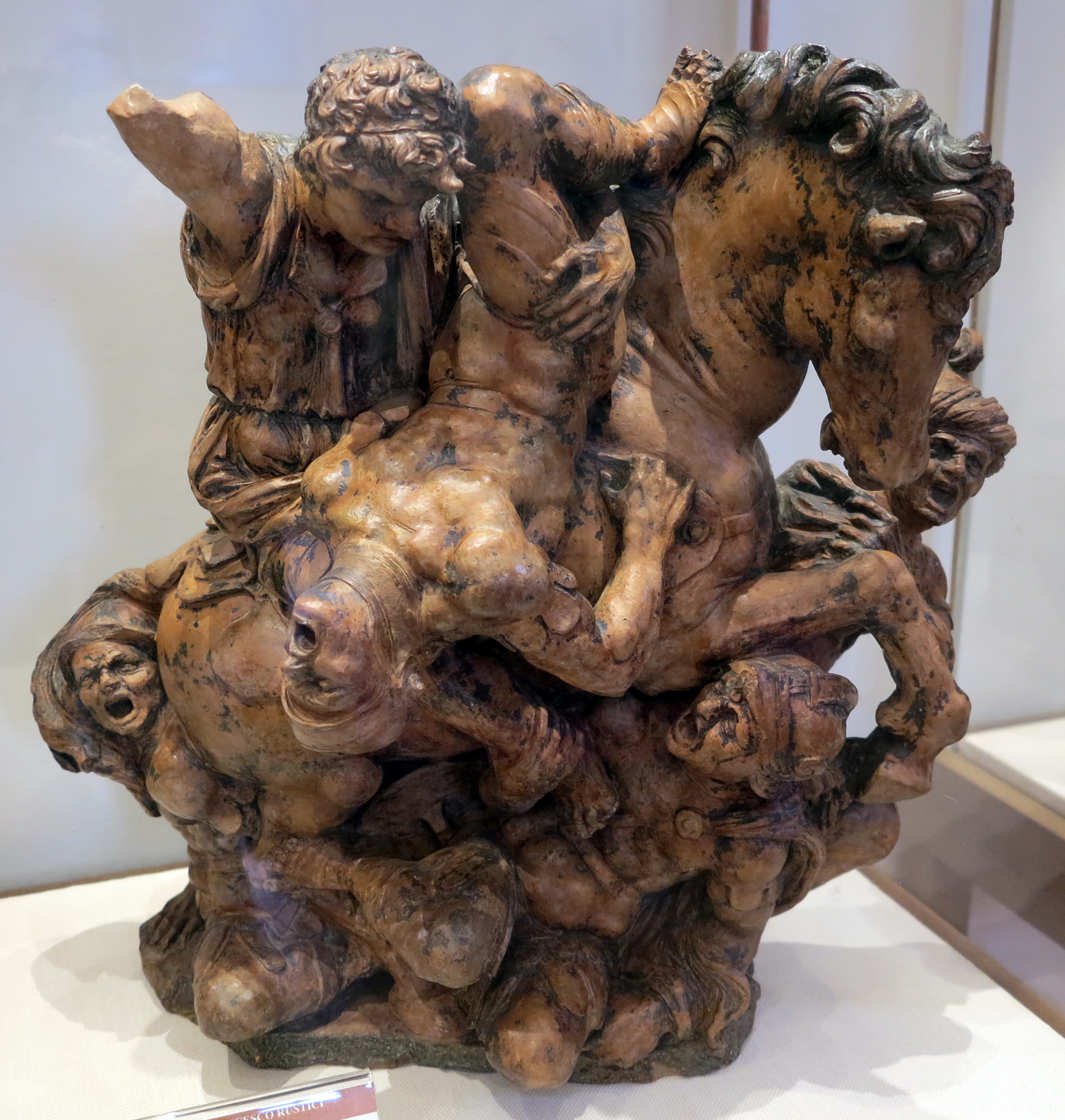
Battle of Anghiari, Giovan Francesco Rustici after Leonardo da Vinci, 1505

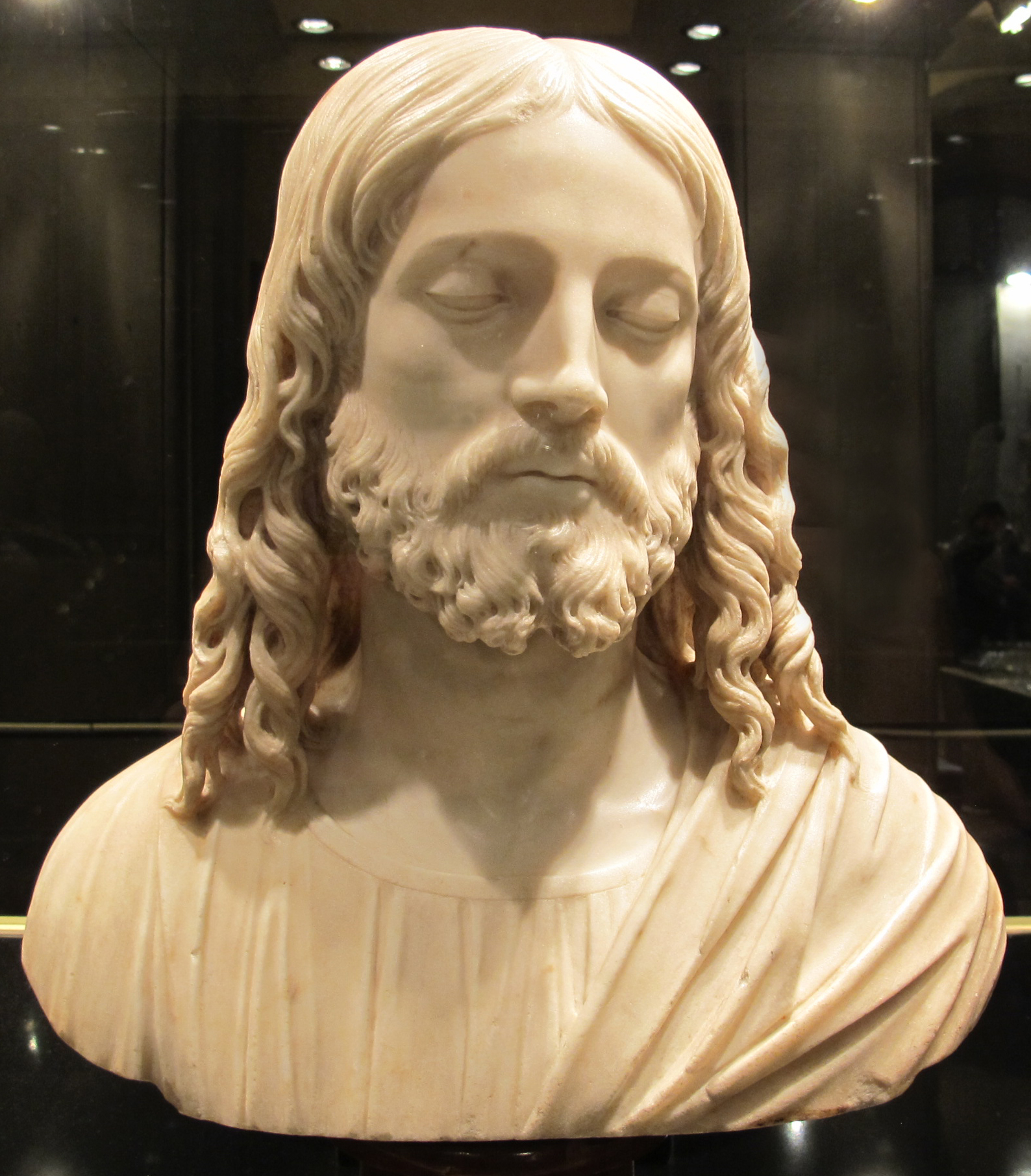
Bust of Christ, Tullio Lombardo, 1520

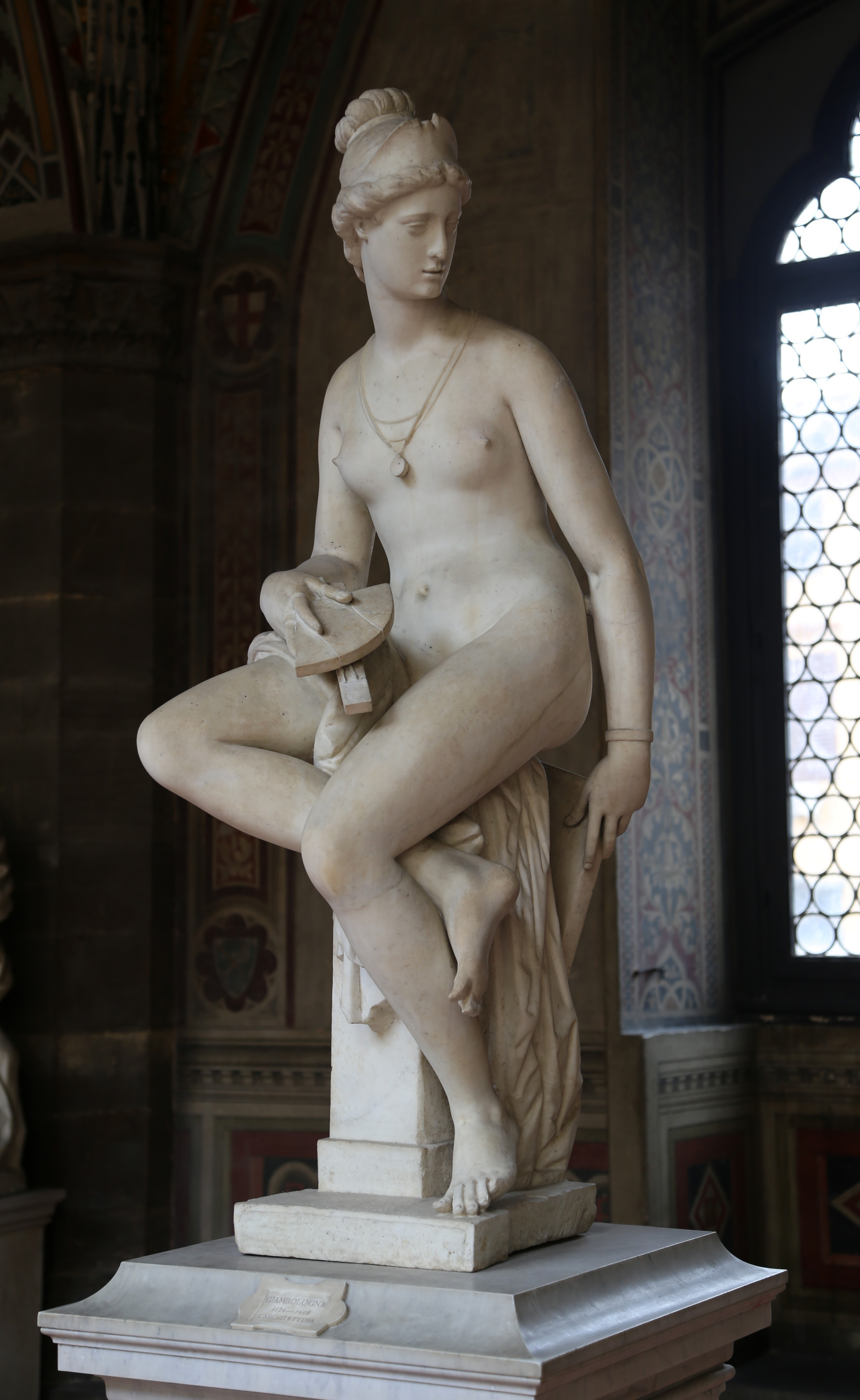
Allegory of Architecture, Giambologna, c. 1570

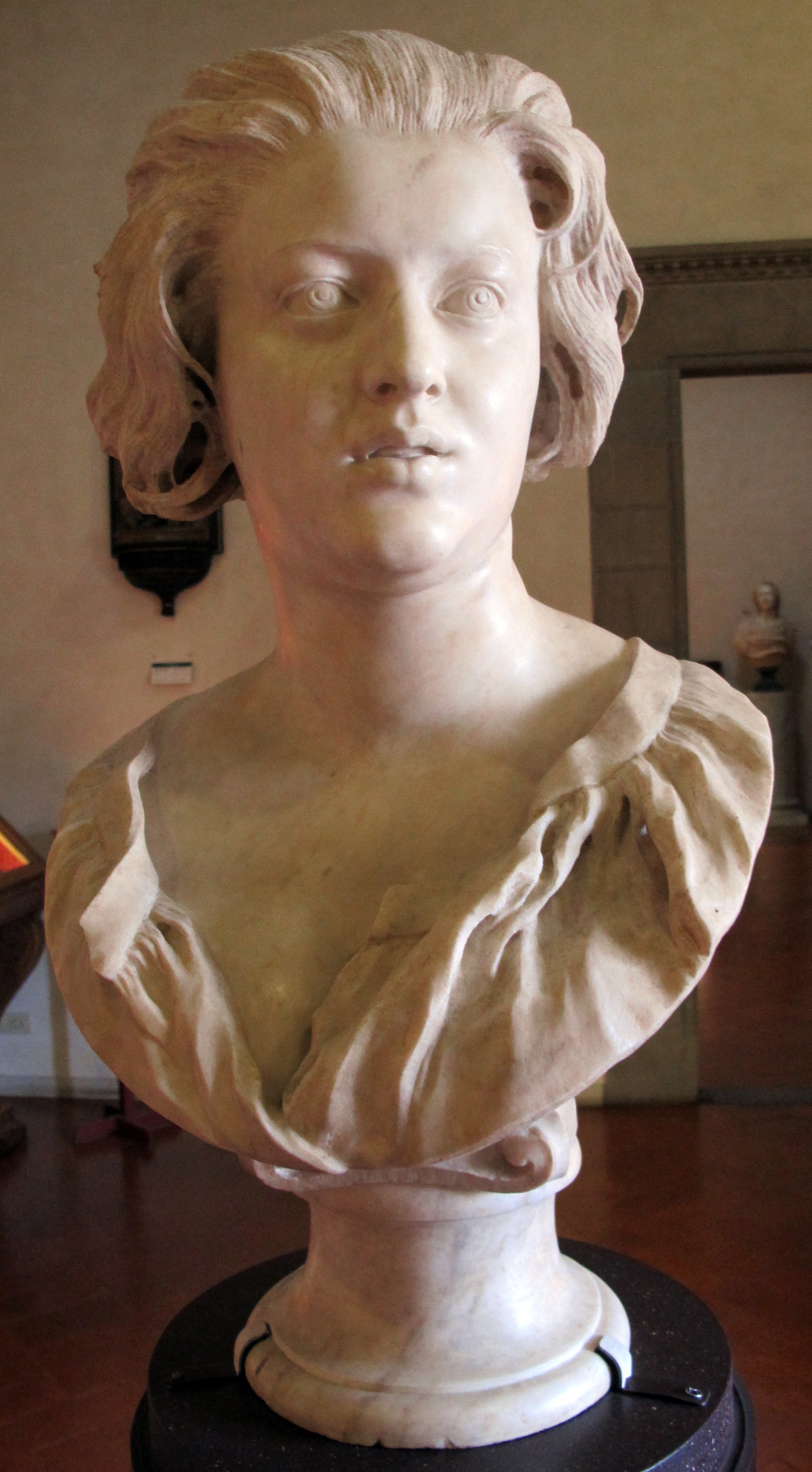
Bust of Costanza Bonarelli, Bernini, 1637/38

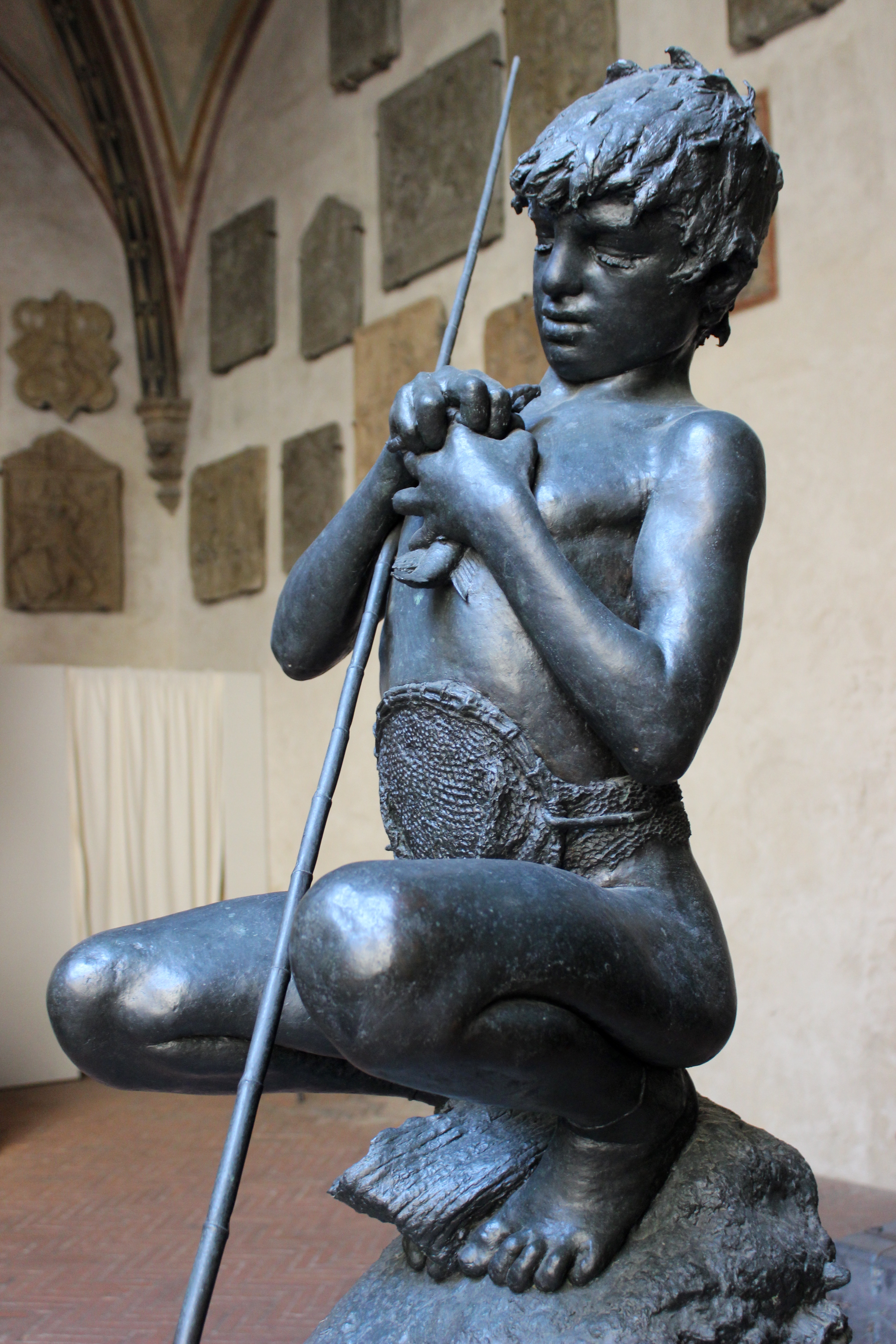
Il Pescatorello ("The Fisherboy"), Vincenzo Gemito, 1876

=== Other ===
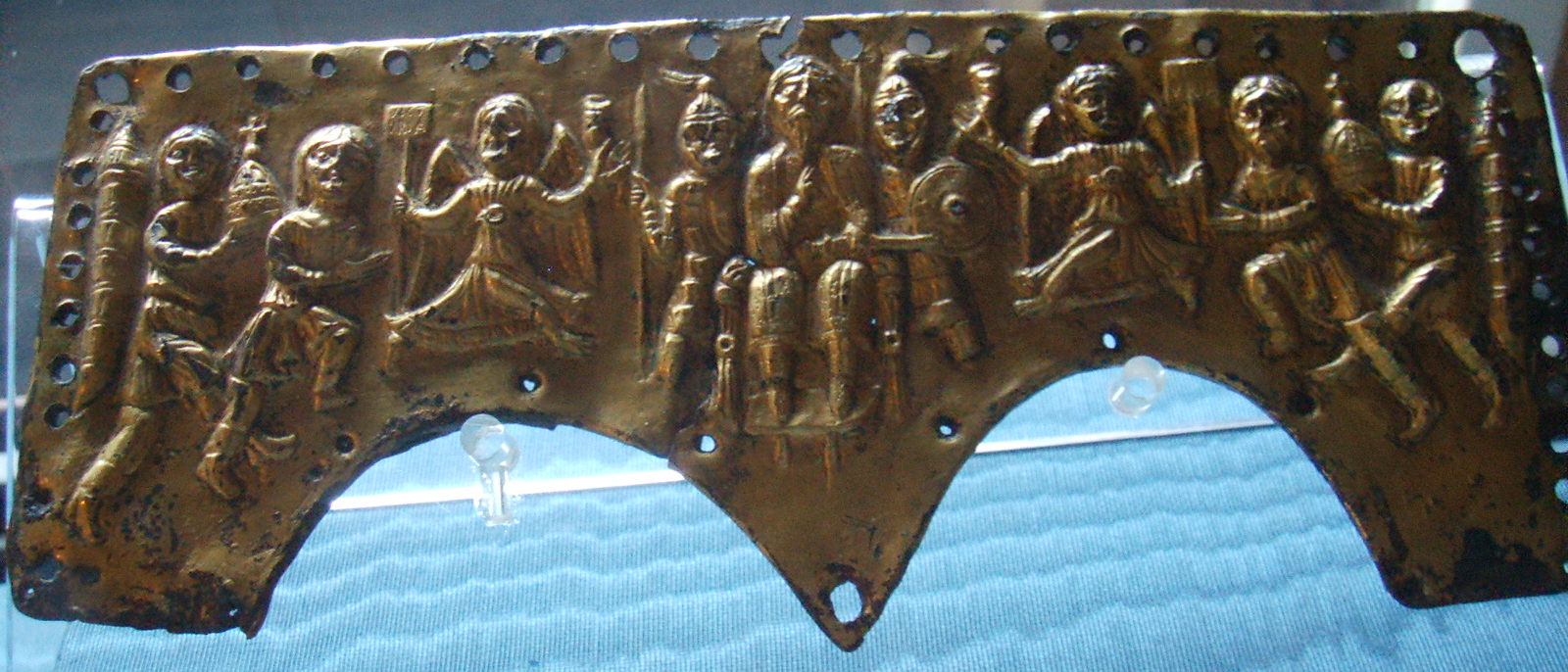
The Lombardic "Agilulf Helmet" plate, 7th century

The museum has a number of paintings, though nothing like the primary Florentine collection in the Uffizi, including the eponymous work by the 15th-century Master of the Bargello Tondo, and many painted cassoni (wedding chests) and desci da parto (painted birthing trays).

In the decorative arts, the museum has a fine collection of ceramics, especially maiolica, textiles, tapestries, ivory, nielli, medals, silver, armour and coins. The right-hand panel of the Anglo-Saxon bone Franks Casket is in the museum. Some of these are of international importance: the Italian nielli are arguably the best collection in the world, as is the collection of Italian Renaissance medals. The Bargello style of needlework has no actual connection with the museum, except that the best collection of early examples is there.

The Islamic Hall at the Bargello was set up in 1982 by Marco Spallanzani and Giovanni Curatola at the direction of Paola Barocchi and Giovanna Gaeta Bertelà, then the director.

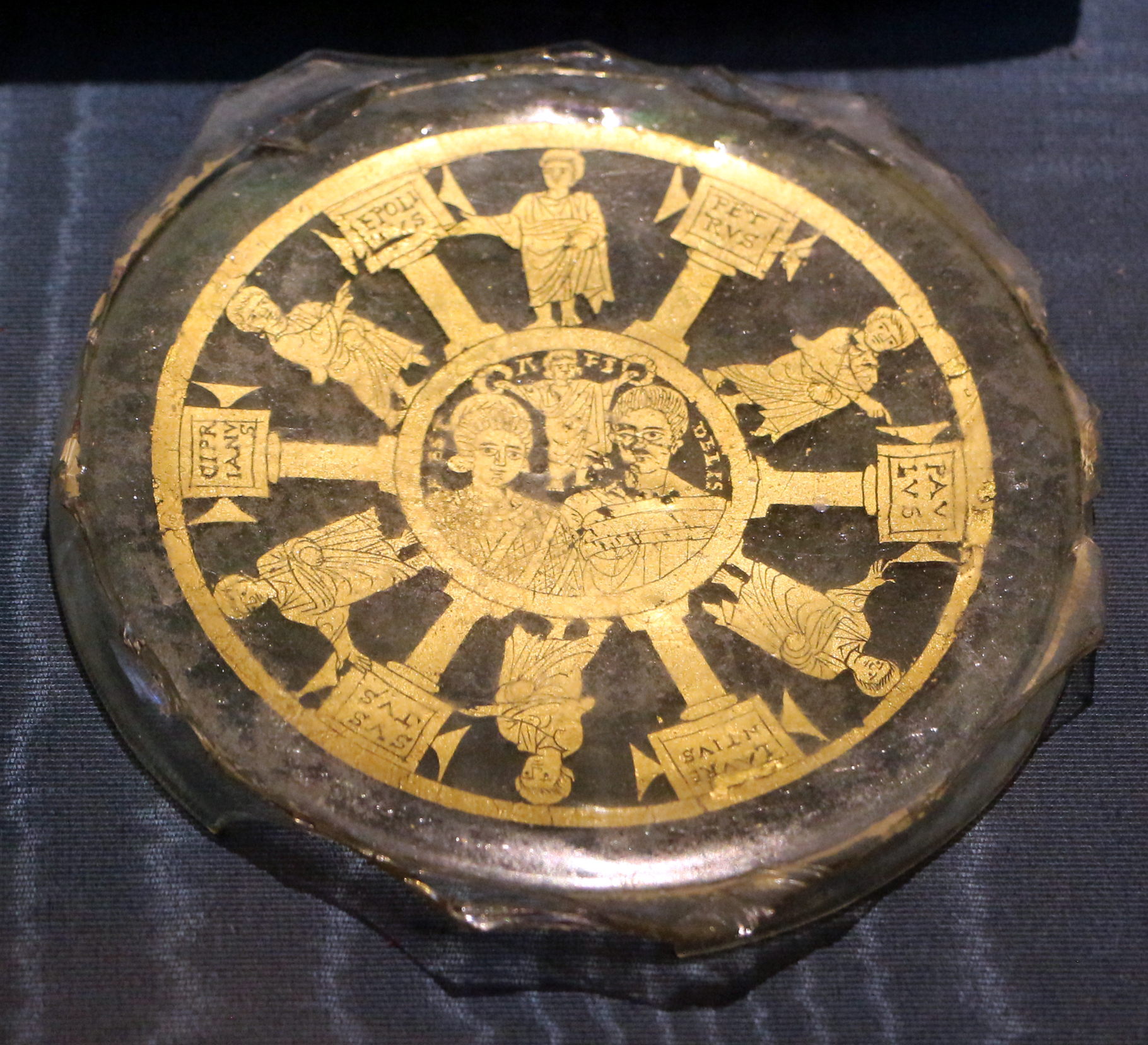
Roman gold glass cup bottom, 350-400

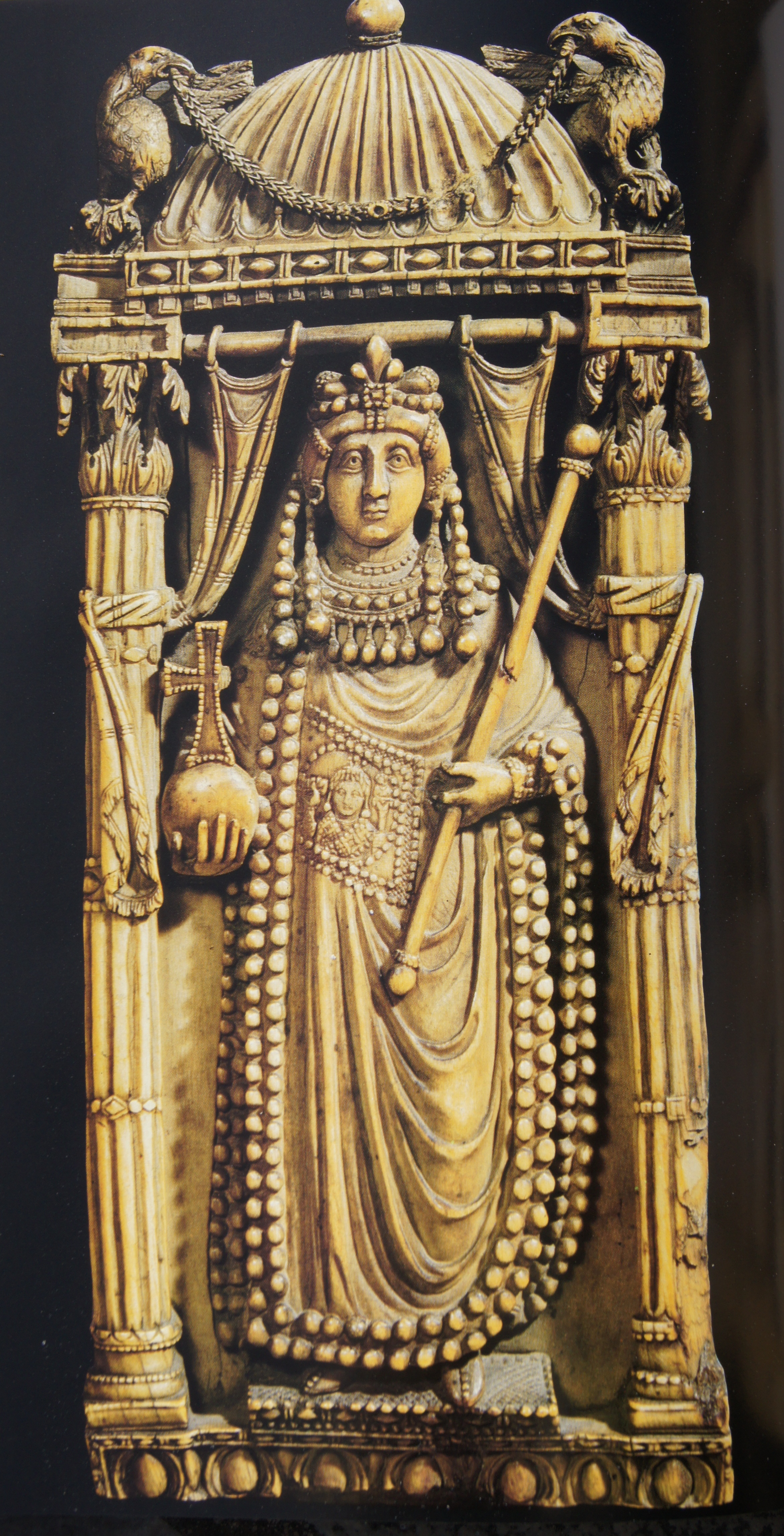
Empress Ariane, Byzantine ivory, 6th century

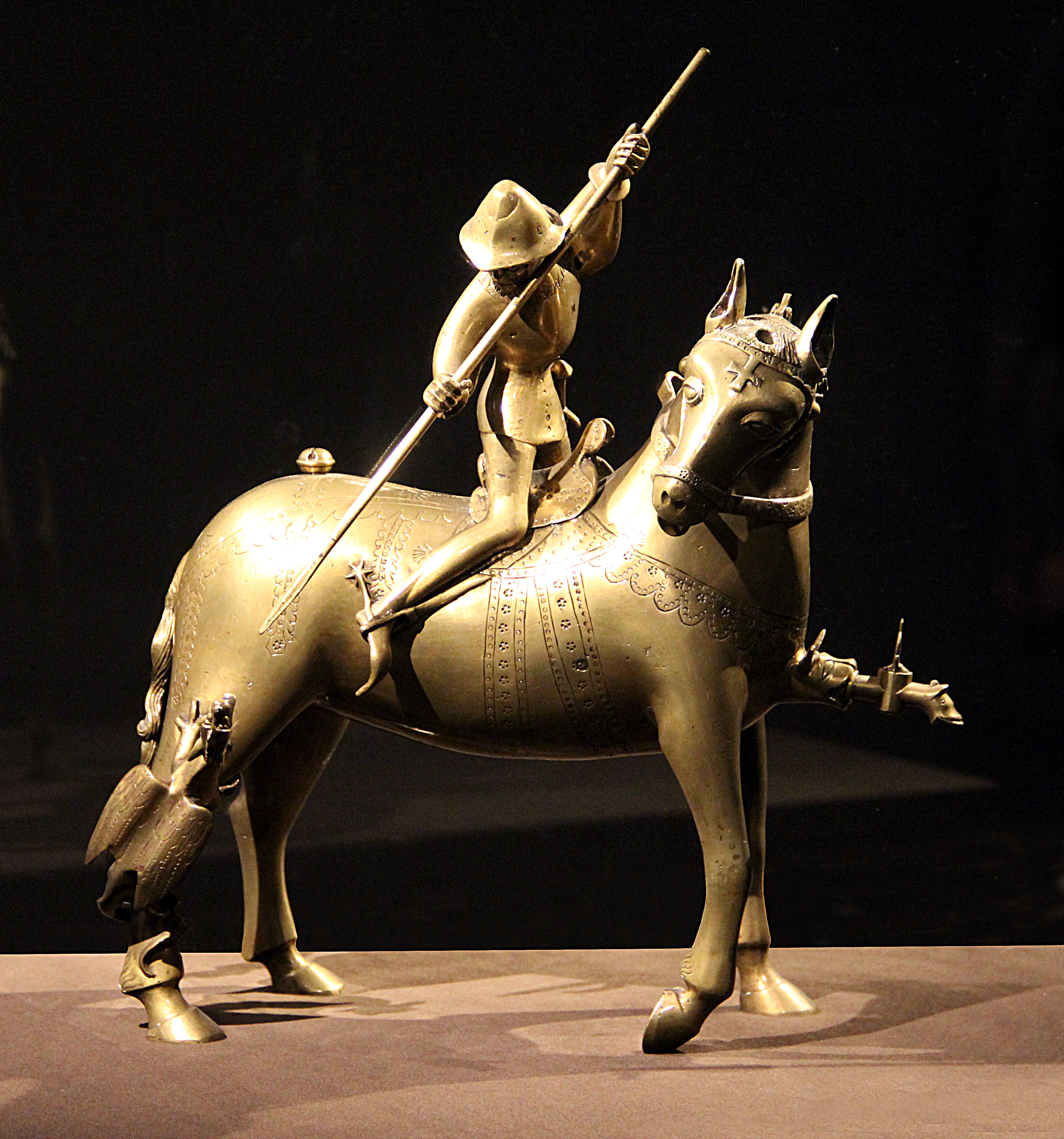
Aquamanile with mounted Saint George (Mosan or Rhine region - c. 1400-1410)

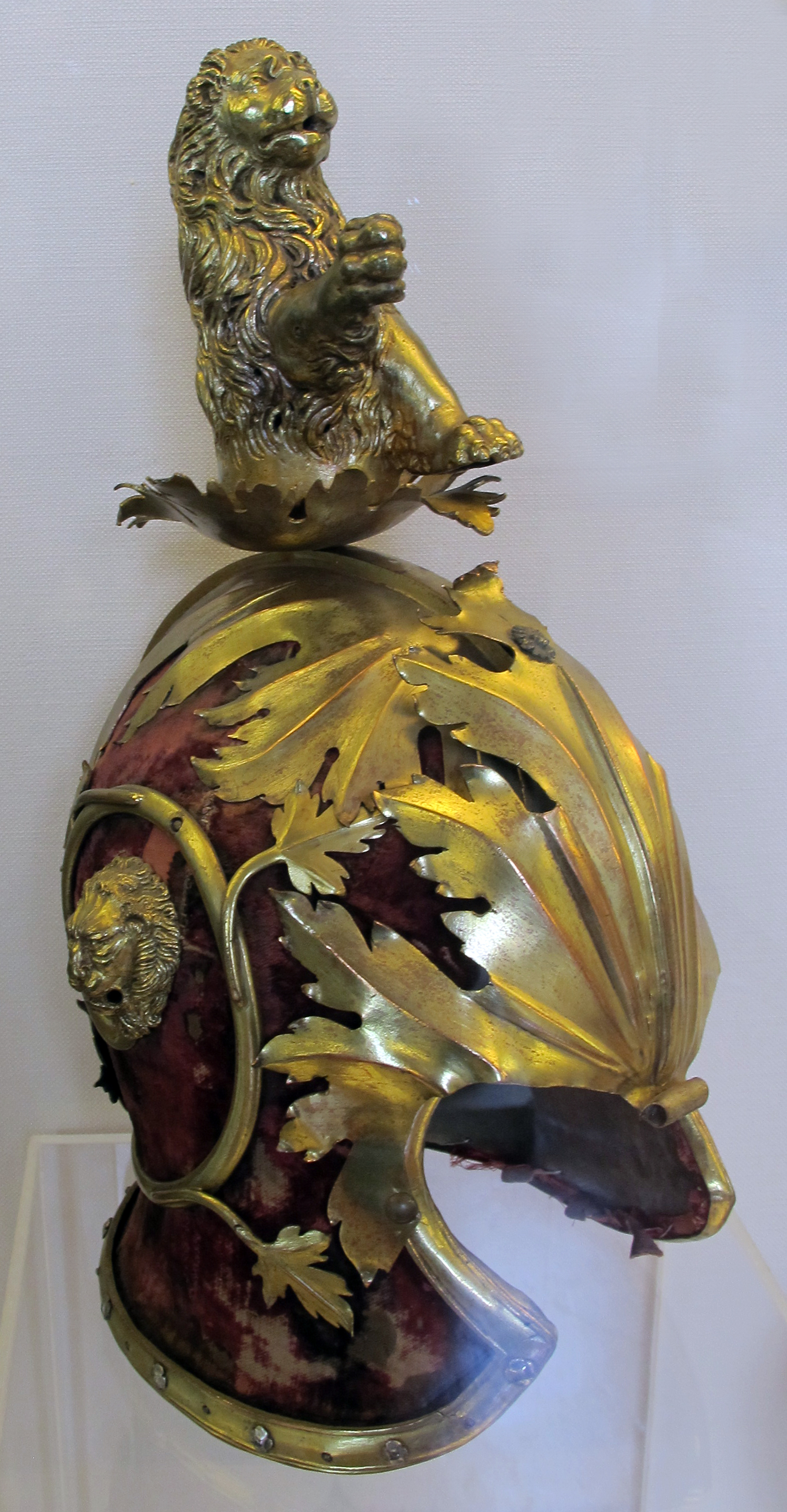
15th-century parade helmet, with later work

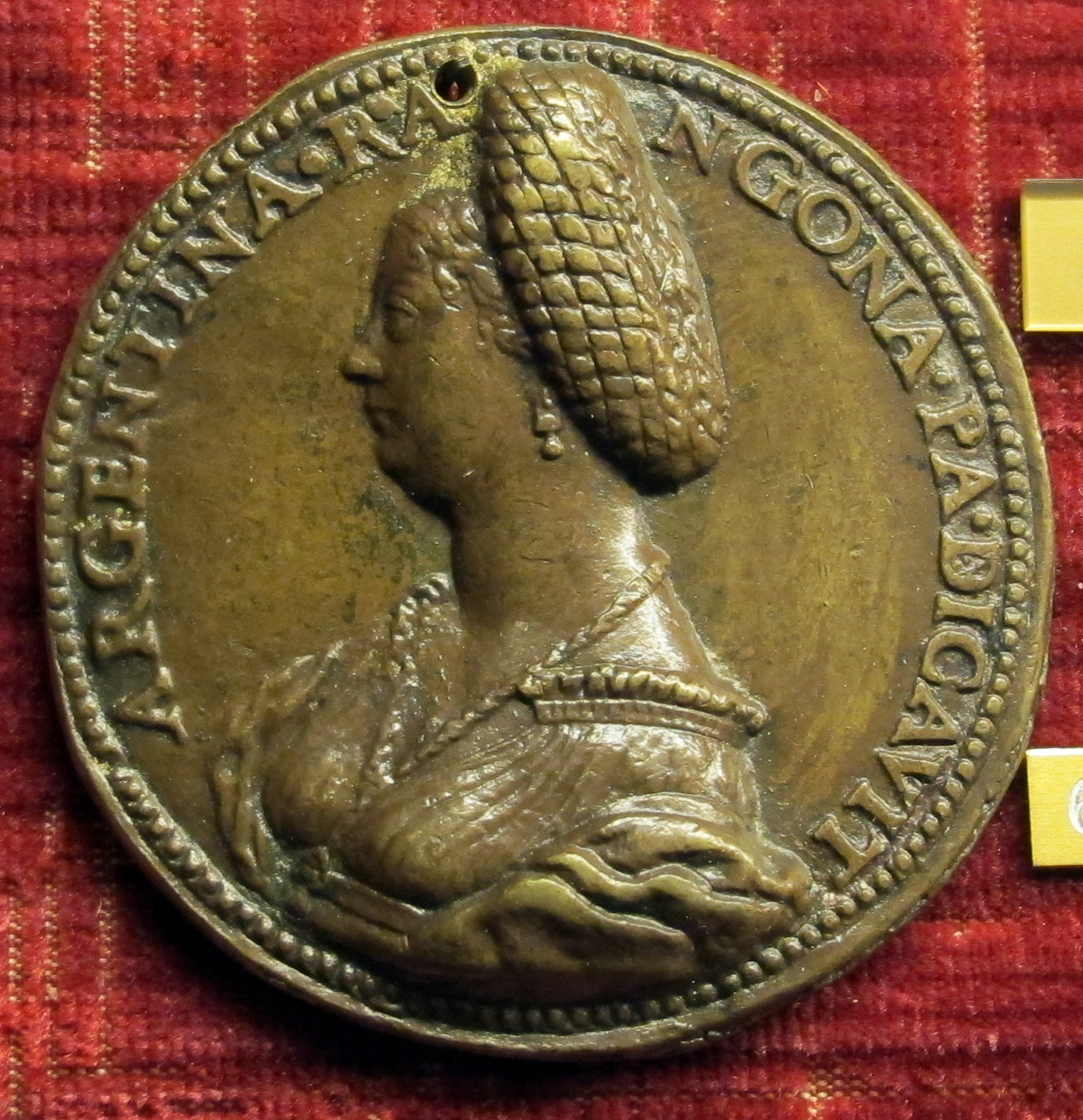
Antonio Vicentino, medal of Argentina Pallavicino

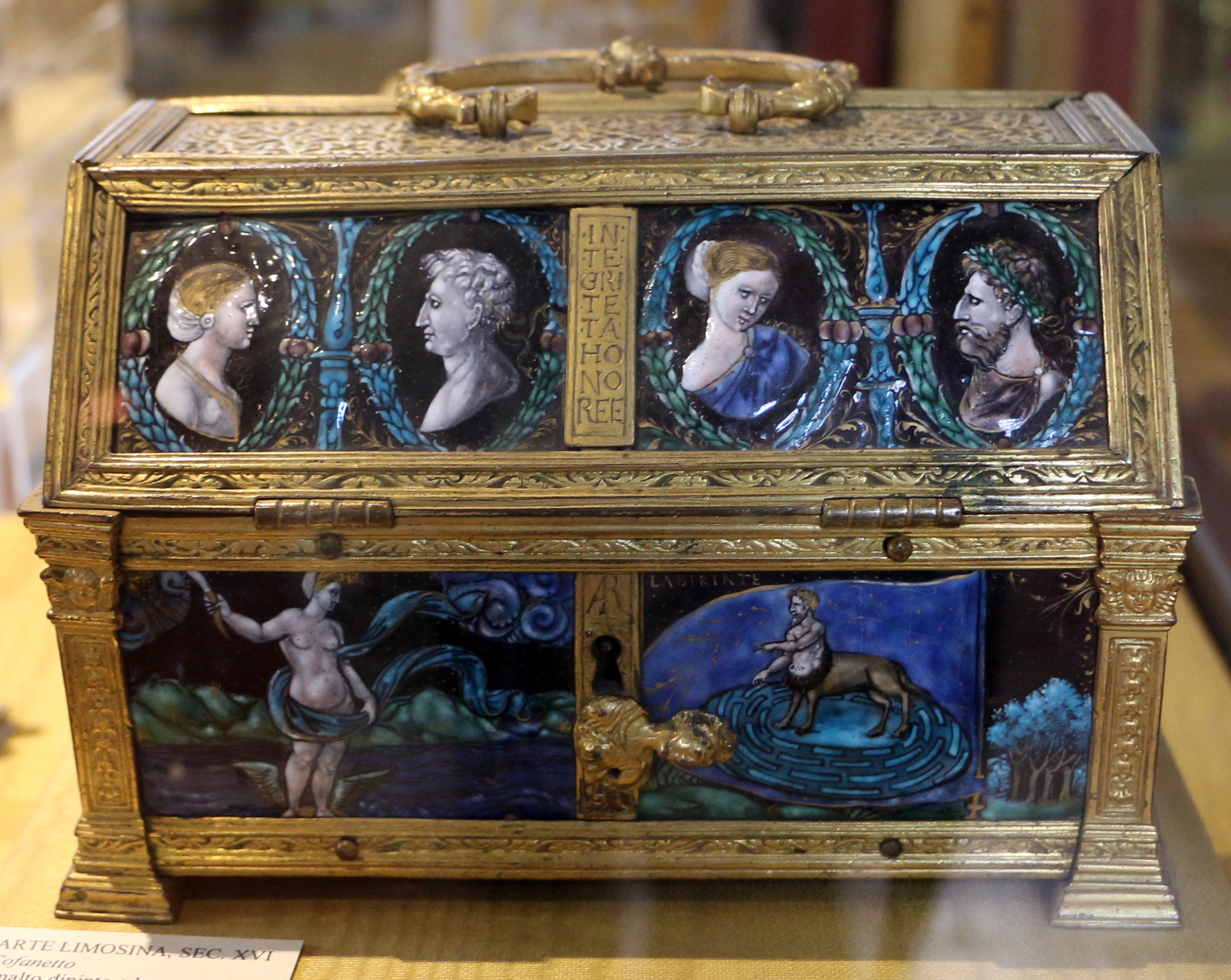
Casket in Renaissance painted Limoges enamel

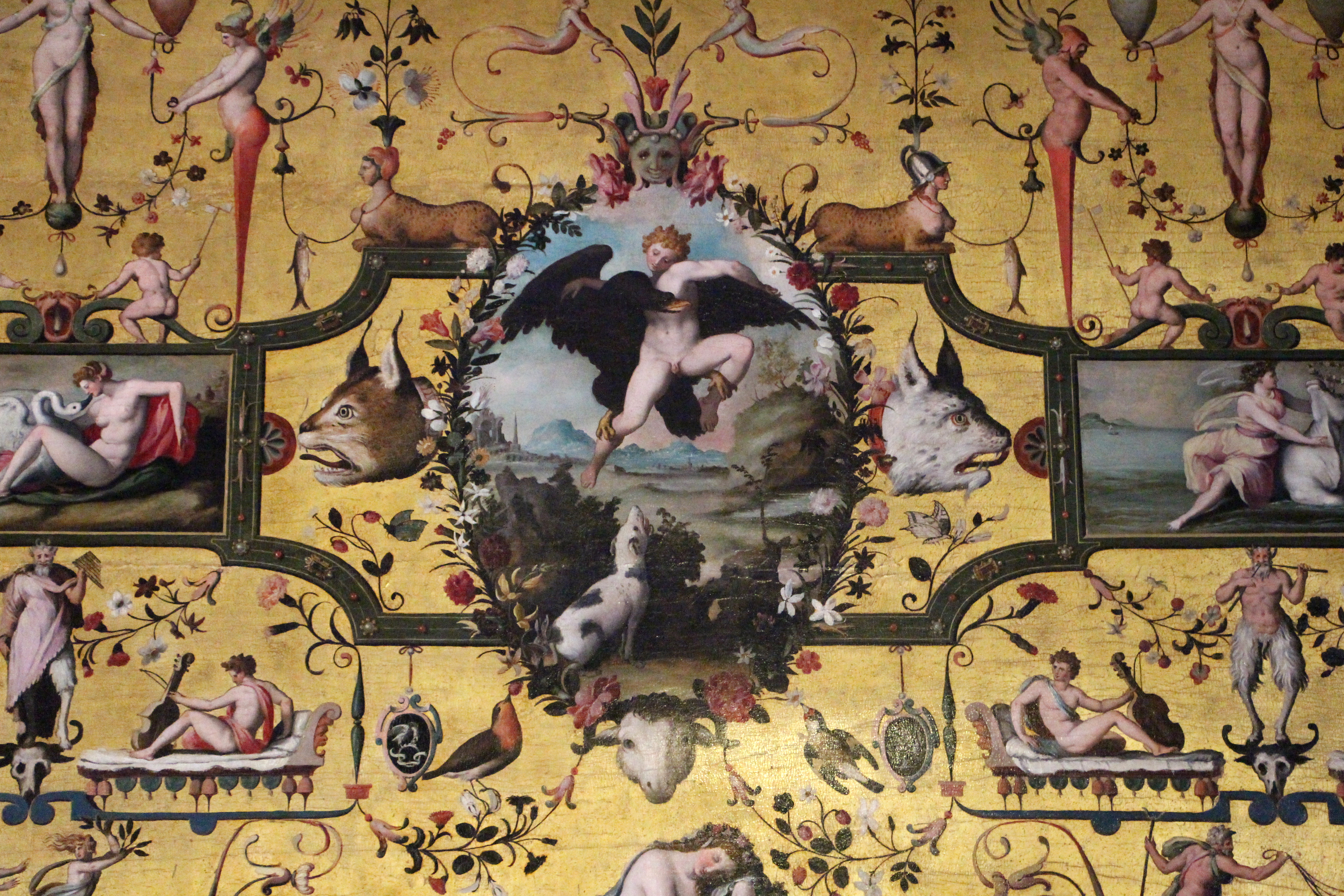
Headboard with the Loves of Jupiter, Alessandro Allori, 1572 (detail)

== See also ==
- Museums of Florence
