= Master of the Bargello Tondo =

Italian painter (1400–1450)

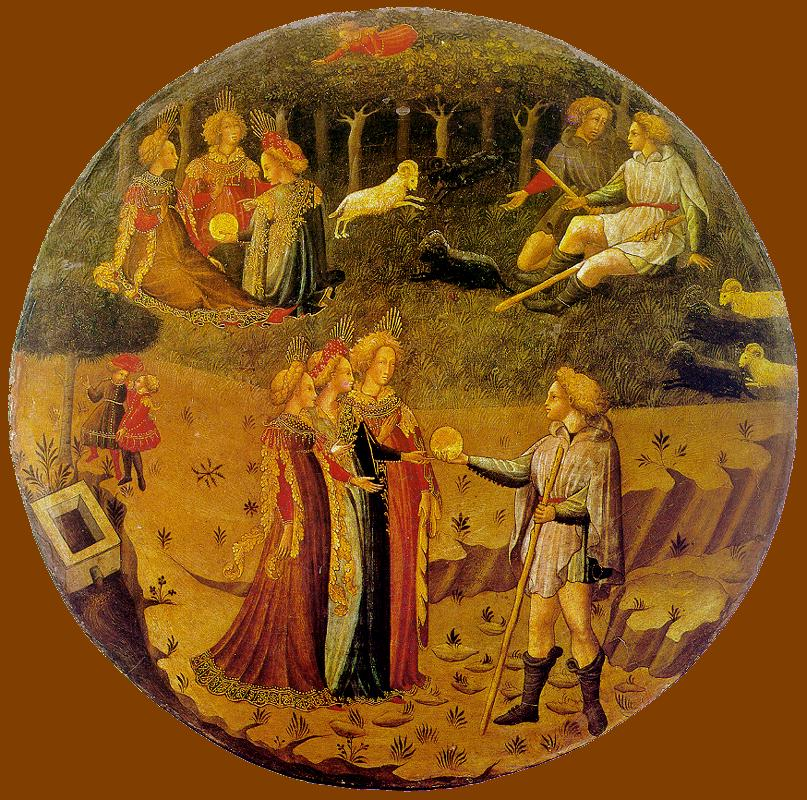
The Judgement of Paris (the Bargello tondo)

Master of the Bargello Tondo (1400 – 1450), was an Italian painter.

== Biography ==
He was a painter of religious works who is known by a tondo in the possession of the Bargello.

He worked in Florence.
