= Bacchus (Michelangelo) =

Sculpture by Michelangelo

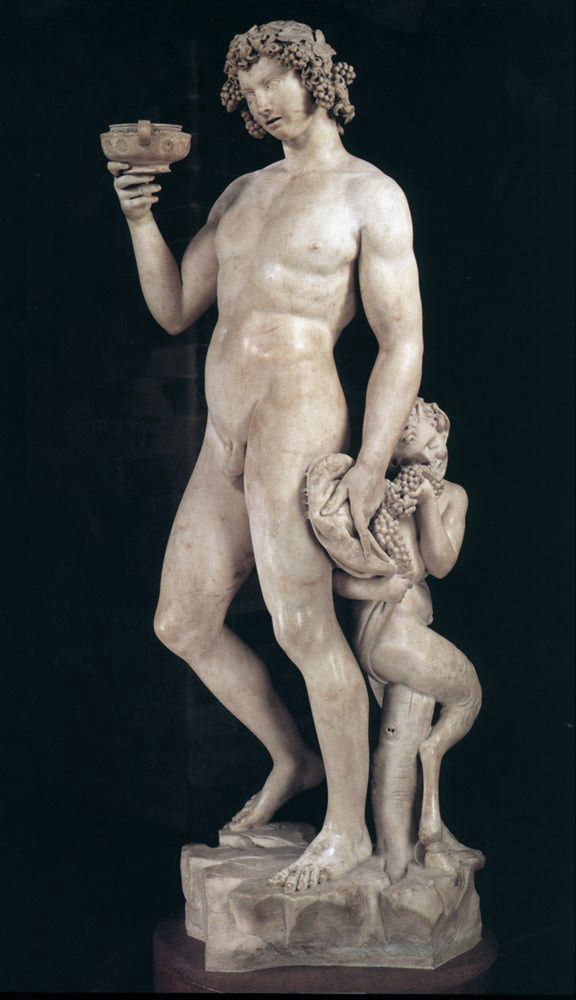
- Artist: Michelangelo
- Year: 1496–1497
- Type: Marble
- Dimensions: 203 cm (80 in)
- Location: Museo Nazionale del Bargello, Florence
- Preceded by: Sleeping Cupid (Michelangelo)
- Followed by: Pietà (Michelangelo)

Bacchus (1496–1497) is a marble sculpture by the Italian High Renaissance sculptor, painter, architect and poet Michelangelo. The statue is somewhat over life-size and represents Bacchus, the Roman god of wine, in a reeling pose suggestive of drunkenness. Commissioned by Raffaele Riario, a high-ranking Cardinal and collector of antique sculpture, it was rejected by him and was bought instead by Jacopo Galli, Riario's banker and a friend to Michelangelo. Together with the Pietà, the Bacchus is one of only two surviving sculptures from the artist's first period in Rome.

== Description ==
Bacchus is depicted with rolling eyes, his staggering body almost teetering off the rocky outcrop on which he stands. Sitting behind him is a satyr, who eats the bunch of grapes slipping out of Bacchus's left hand. With its swollen breast and abdomen, the figure of Bacchus suggested to Giorgio Vasari "both the slenderness of a young man and the fleshiness and roundness of a woman", and its androgynous quality has often been noted (although the testicles are swollen as well). The inspiration for the work appears to be the description in Pliny the Elder's Natural History of a lost bronze sculpture by Praxiteles, depicting "Bacchus, Drunkenness and a satyr". The sense of precariousness resulting from a high centre of gravity can be found in a number of later works by the artist, most notably the David and the figures on the Sistine Chapel ceiling.

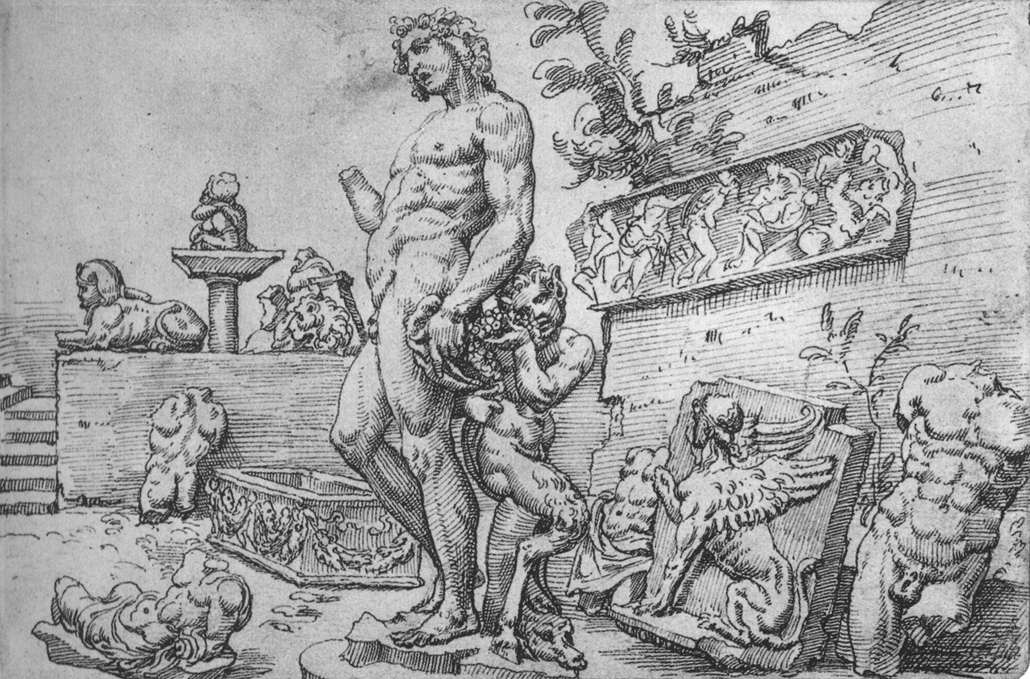
Drawing of the Bacchus in the sculpture garden of Jacopo Galli by Maarten van Heemskerck, c. 1533–1536

Bacchus is depicted as a naked man who appears to be entranced with his own creation. Its style of nudity is a combination of both ancient proportions and a style which is much more naturalistic. The eyes of Bacchus, staring at the cup of wine in his right hand, are squinted but have a sense of passion in them towards the wine. Bacchus is standing in a traditional pose, but due to his drunkenness he is leaning backwards. His mouth is gaped open and his eyes are rolling, creating a more natural illusion of being tipsy. The sculpture of Bacchus is in the round and contains a compelling sense of antiquity, similar to other sculptures of Bacchus such as Praxiteles' Dionysus.

Due to weathering, this sculpture had taken quite a bit of damage over the years. The right hand containing the cup was replaced, the vine shoots had worn, and his penis had been removed. The vine shoots may have been due to natural weathering. A Latin poem recently discovered by Diletta Gamberini shows that the sculpture was briefly looted during the Sack of Rome of 1527 and brought to a ship to be taken away, before being abandoned. Unintentional damages to the sculpture may be attributed to this event.

The hand and the penis have a different story. It is possible the damage could have been due to natural causes; however, loss of the two body parts might also have been for the sake of an authentic archaeological appearance. The hand holding the goblet was broken off and the penis chiseled away before Maarten van Heemskerck saw the sculpture in the 1530s. Only the goblet was restored, in the early 1550s. The mutilation may have been to give the sculpture an illusion of greater antiquity, placed as it initially was among an antique torso and fragmentary Roman reliefs in Jacopo Galli's Roman garden. Such a concession to "classical" sensibilities did not, however, convince Percy Bysshe Shelley of the work's fidelity to "the spirit and meaning of Bacchus". He wrote that "It looks drunken, brutal, and narrow-minded, and has an expression of dissoluteness the most revolting". The art historian Johannes Wilde summarized responses to the sculpture thus: "in brief... it is not the image of a god".

== Symbolism ==
Michelangelo included iconography that identifies the figure as Bacchus in this sculpture. Bacchus, also known as Dionysus, was the subject of the ancient Cult of Dionysus. The symbols that can be seen within the cult and Bacchus are wine, ivy, and tigers/leopards, he is also constantly seen with satyrs. All these symbols can be spotted in the Michelangelo Bacchus sculpture.

=== Ivy/grape leaves ===
Bacchus wears a wreath of ivy leaves, as that plant was sacred to the god. (They are not, as is often supposed, vine leaves.) Bacchus wears these vines and grape leaves on his head because he is the inventor of wine.

=== Goblet ===
He eyes the goblet of wine that he holds in his right hand. The viewer can assume that this goblet contains wine and that Bacchus has fallen under the spell of his own creation. In a way, the goblet that is being held has the illusion that it is tilted in a drunken manner. This shows that Bacchus is intoxicated and gives the action of him either gently spilling his liquid creation upon humanity or more realistically upon the viewer who is gazing upon him.

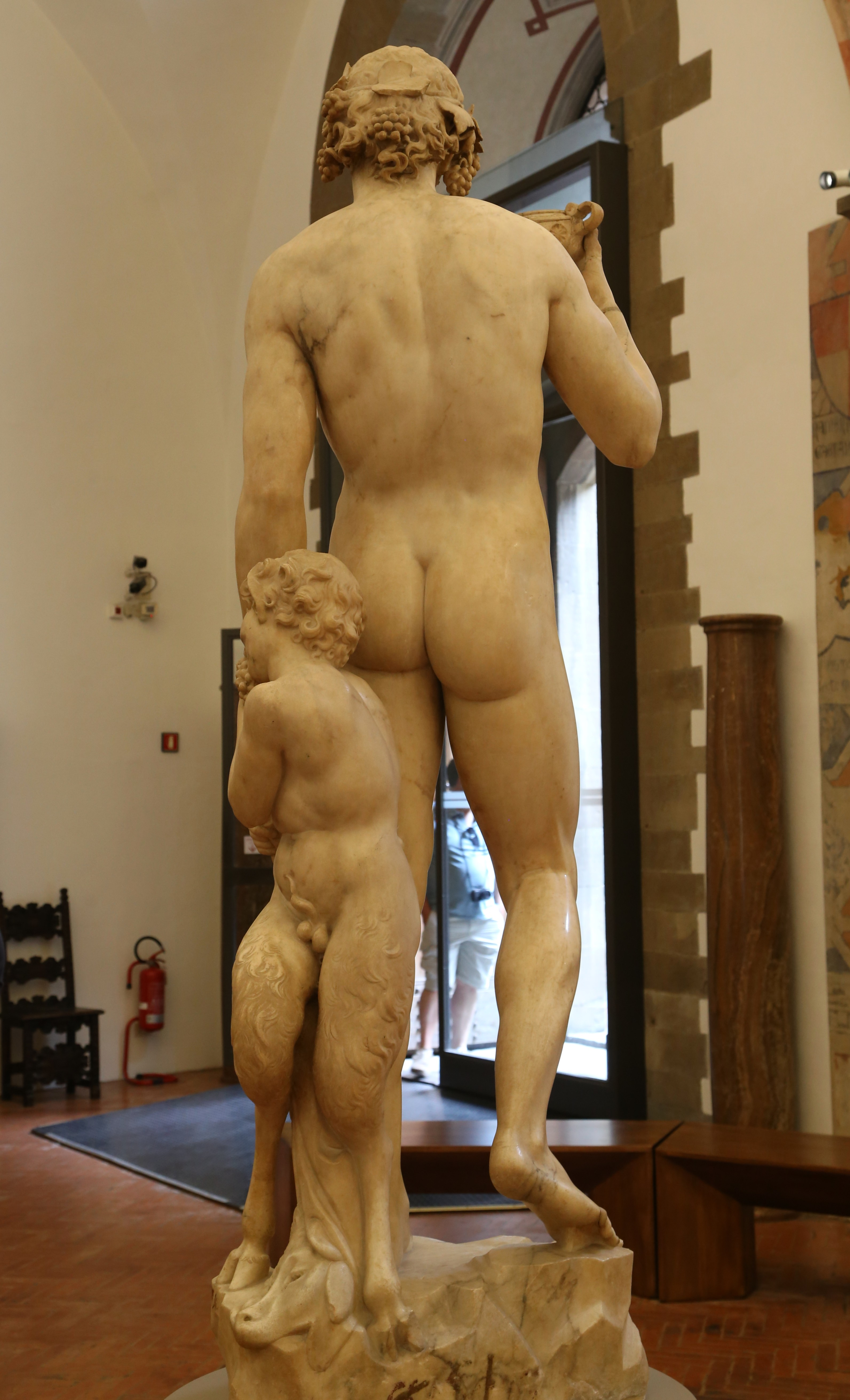
Rear of the sculpture

=== Skin ===
In the left hand of Bacchus, is a skin surrounded by grape leaves. The skin that is being held is of a Tiger though there are thoughts that it could possibly be the skin of a Leopardus. The tiger is supposedly an animal associated with Bacchus "for its love of the grape" (according to Michelangelo's biographer Ascanio Condivi). The feline skin is representative of both life and death. The feline in life must have been overwhelmed by the pressed fruit of Bacchus and as a result, it cost its life.

== History ==
In his early career, Michelangelo had several prominent patrons who commissioned him for his work. The patron for Bacchus was the high-ranking Cardinal Raffaele Riario, who had previously bought Cupid (also known as Sleeping Cupid), a work made by Michelangelo but passed off as an authentic ancient sculpture. Cardinal Riario later discovered Michelangelo's fraud and demanded a refund of 200 ducats.

In a letter, Cardinal Raffaele Riario asked Michelangelo if he was courageous enough to make his own work, instead of copying other masters. As a result, Michelangelo agreed and using a block of life-sized marble created the Bacchus. The statue was commissioned for the Cardinal's garden. who intended for it to complement his collection of classical sculptures. After gazing upon the final product, Cardinal Raffaele Riario refused to accept the piece for he deemed it too sinful, a symbol of sexual desire.

By 1506 the sculpture found its way to the collection of Jacopo Galli, banker to both the cardinal and Michelangelo, who had a similar garden near the Palazzo della Cancelleria. There it first appeared in a drawing by Maarten van Heemskerck, c. 1533–1536. The statue was bought for the Medici and transferred to Florence in 1572.

=== Letters to his father ===
During the process of finishing Bacchus, Michelangelo sent letters to his father. The letters discusses the cardinal, who refused to accept the newly made Bacchus. The tone of the letters shows that Michelangelo and his father had a difficult relationship.

July 1, 1497

Do not be astonished that I have not come back, because I have not yet been able to work out my affairs with the Cardinal, and don't want to leave if I haven't been satisfied and reimbursed for my labor first; with these great personages one has to go slow, since they can't be pushed...

August 19

I undertook to do a figure for Piero de’ Medici and bought marble, and then never began it, because he hasn't done as he promised me. So I'm working on my own and doing a figure for my own pleasure. I bought a piece of marble for five ducats, but it wasn't a good piece and the money was thrown away; then I bought another piece for another five ducats, and this I'm working for my own pleasure. So you must realize that I, too, have expenses and troubles...

1509

...for twelve years now I have gone about all over Italy, leading a miserable life; I have borne every kind of humiliation, suffered every kind of hardship, worn myself to the bone... solely to help my family...

1512

I live meanly...with the greatest toil and a thousand worries. It has been about fifteen years since I have had a happy hour; I have done everything to help you, and you have never recognized it or believed it. God pardon us all.

== Replicas ==
Several replicas of Michelangelo's marble sculpture have been produced and displayed in different locations, allowing people to experience the famous Renaissance work outside its original setting in Florence. One documented replica is located in Mexico City along Avenida Álvaro Obregón, next to Parque España, in the Roma neighborhood. Other reproductions are recorded in museum and collection contexts, including a cast in the Pushkin Museum in Moscow and a replica in Florence.

The work also attracted the attention of artists and bronze founders soon after its creation. A bronze group attributed to a Florentine workshop and dated to the second half of the 16th century is described by Christie's as a faithful reproduction of Michelangelo's marble. The small bronze depicts the same figure holding a chalice and accompanied by the faun, and its close relationship to the marble suggests that the original served as a model for subsequent sculptors. Another bronze version, made in France in the 17th century, is described as a close interpretation of the marble and demonstrates the continuing interest in the composition outside Italy. An additional Italian bronze, dated to the 18th century and described as after Michelangelo, is associated with the workshop of Massimiliano Soldani Benzi

The influence of the sculpture extended beyond three-dimensional copies. A drawing made in 1709, now in the British Museum, records the figure as part of a volume of studies of Roman sculpture. Earlier, Maarten van Heemskerck had drawn the work while it was still in Jacopo Galli's Roman garden, providing important evidence for its appearance and setting before it was transferred to Florence. These reproductions and studies demonstrate the continuing interest in Michelangelo's interpretation from the Renaissance through later centuries. They should, however, be distinguished from independent sculptures of the Roman god of wine, since not every later representation of the subject is derived from Michelangelo's composition.

== Other versions ==
A 1st-century bronze statuette depicting Bacchus as a child was discovered in 1894 during excavations at the Gallo-Roman settlement of Vertillum (modern Vertault) in eastern France. The figure is approximately 40 cm (16 in) high and is now associated with the Musée du Pays Châtillonnais. It was selected for the 1937 exhibition Chefs-d'œuvre de l'art français in Paris, where it was displayed as an important example of ancient French art. The sculpture is considerably earlier than Michelangelo's work and is not a replica or copy of it; rather, it is an independent ancient representation of the same Roman god.

The bronze was stolen from the Musée du Pays Châtillonnais on 19 December 1973, together with approximately 5,000 Roman coins. It remained missing for almost five decades before being identified by Dutch art investigator Arthur Brand. After its provenance was established, the sculpture was returned to the museum in February 2022. During its absence, the museum had displayed a copy in its place; following the recovery, the museum's director noted the difference between the original and the replacement copy.

== In popular fiction ==
The 1965 biopic The Agony and the Ecstasy starts with a documentary list of works by Michelangelo. The voice-over says Bacchus depicts a devil tempting Adam.

== See also ==
- List of works by Michelangelo
