= Equestrian statue =

Statue of a rider mounted on a horse

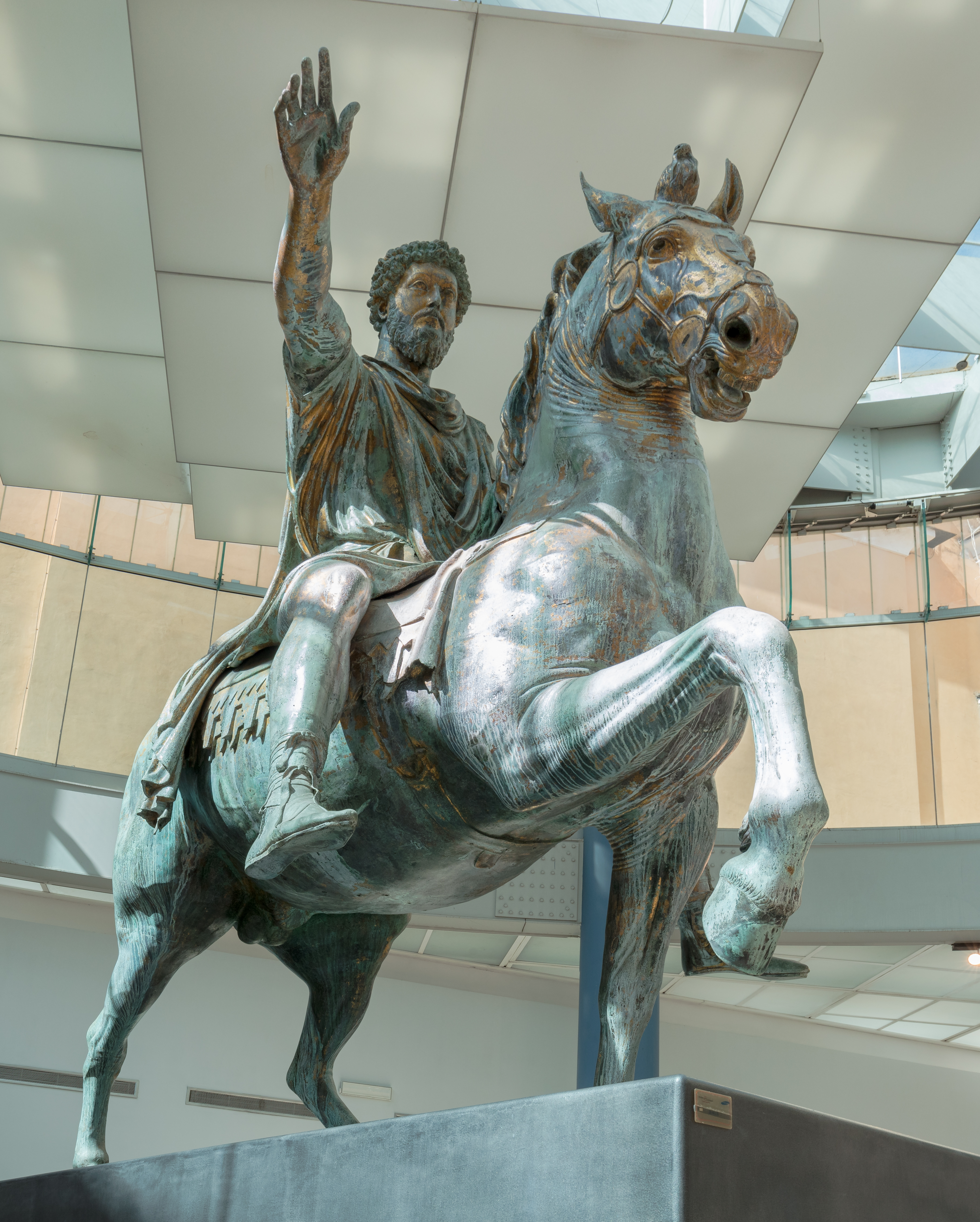
The 2nd-century Roman bronze equestrian statue of Marcus Aurelius, highly visible in Rome since antiquity, was the main influence on the Renaissance revival of the form

An equestrian statue is a statue of a rider mounted on a horse, from the Latin eques, meaning 'knight', deriving from equus, meaning 'horse'. A statue of a riderless horse is strictly an equine statue. A full-sized equestrian statue is a difficult and expensive object for any culture to produce, and figures have typically been portraits of rulers or, in the Renaissance and more recently, military commanders.

Although there are outliers, the form is essentially a tradition in Western art, used for imperial propaganda by the Roman emperors, with a significant revival in Italian Renaissance sculpture, which continued across Europe in the Baroque, as mastering the large-scale casting of bronze became more widespread, and later periods.

Statues at well under life-size have been popular in various materials, including porcelain, since the Renaissance. The riders in these may not be portraits, but figures from classical mythology or generic figures such as Native Americans.

== History ==
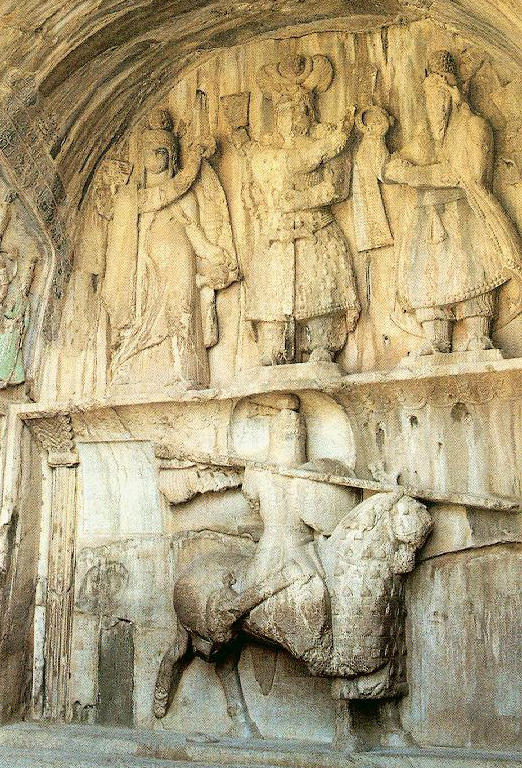
Khosrow Parviz is standing here. On his left is Ahura Mazda, on his right is Anahita, and below is, Khosrau dressed as a mounted Persian knight riding on his favourite horse, Shabdiz, in the city of, Kermanshah, Iran

=== Ancient Greece ===
Equestrian statuary in the West dates back at least as far as Archaic Greece. Found on the Athenian acropolis, the sixth-century BC statue known as the Rampin Rider depicts a kouros mounted on horseback.

=== Ancient Middle and Far East ===
A number of ancient Egyptian, Assyrian and Persian reliefs show mounted figures, usually rulers, though no free-standing statues are known. The Chinese Terracotta Army has no mounted riders, though cavalrymen stand beside their mounts, but smaller Tang dynasty pottery tomb Qua figures often include them, at a relatively small scale. No Chinese portrait equestrian statues were made until modern times; statues of rulers are not part of traditional Chinese art, and indeed even painted portraits were only shown to high officials on special occasions until the eleventh century.

=== Ancient Rome ===
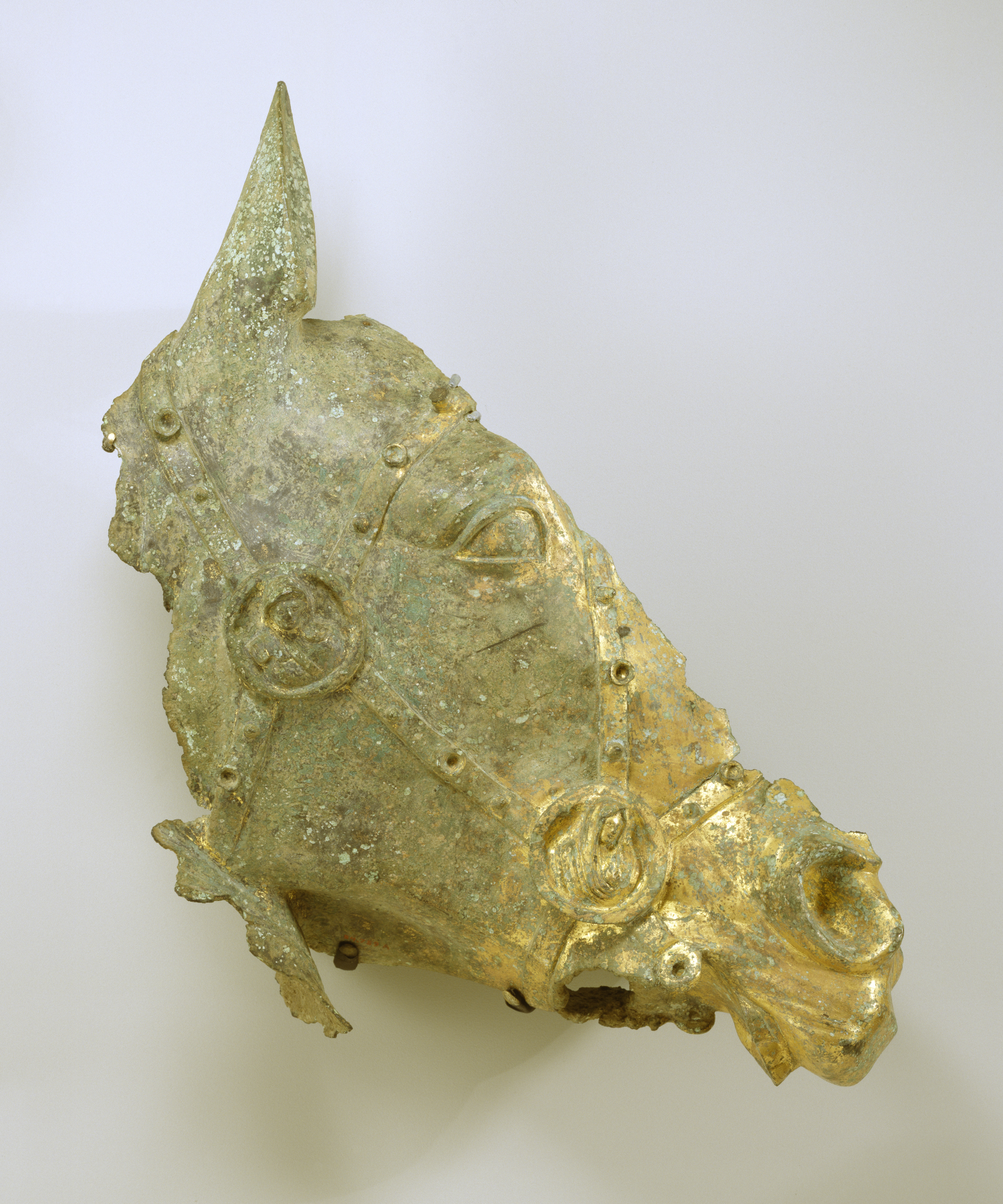
This horse head from Suasa was once part of a large equestrian monument. c. 40 AD. Walters Art Museum, Baltimore.

In ancient Rome, equestrian statues frequently commemorated military leaders, and those statesmen who wished to symbolically emphasize the active leadership role undertaken by the equestrian class, the equites (plural of eques) or cavalrymen/knights.

There were numerous bronze equestrian portraits (particularly of the emperors), but they were typically melted down for reuse, for example in Christian churches or as coinage. The still standing Colossus of Barletta lost parts of his legs and arms to Dominican bells in 1309. Almost the only surviving Roman equestrian bronze, the equestrian statue of Marcus Aurelius on the Campidoglio in Rome, owes its preservation to the popular misidentification of Marcus Aurelius, the philosopher-emperor, with Constantine the Great, the Christian emperor. The Regisole ("Sun King") was a bronze classical or Late Antique equestrian monument of a ruler, highly influential during the Italian Renaissance, but destroyed in 1796 in the wake of the French Revolution. A fragment of an equestrian portrait sculpture of Augustus has also survived.

=== Medieval Europe ===
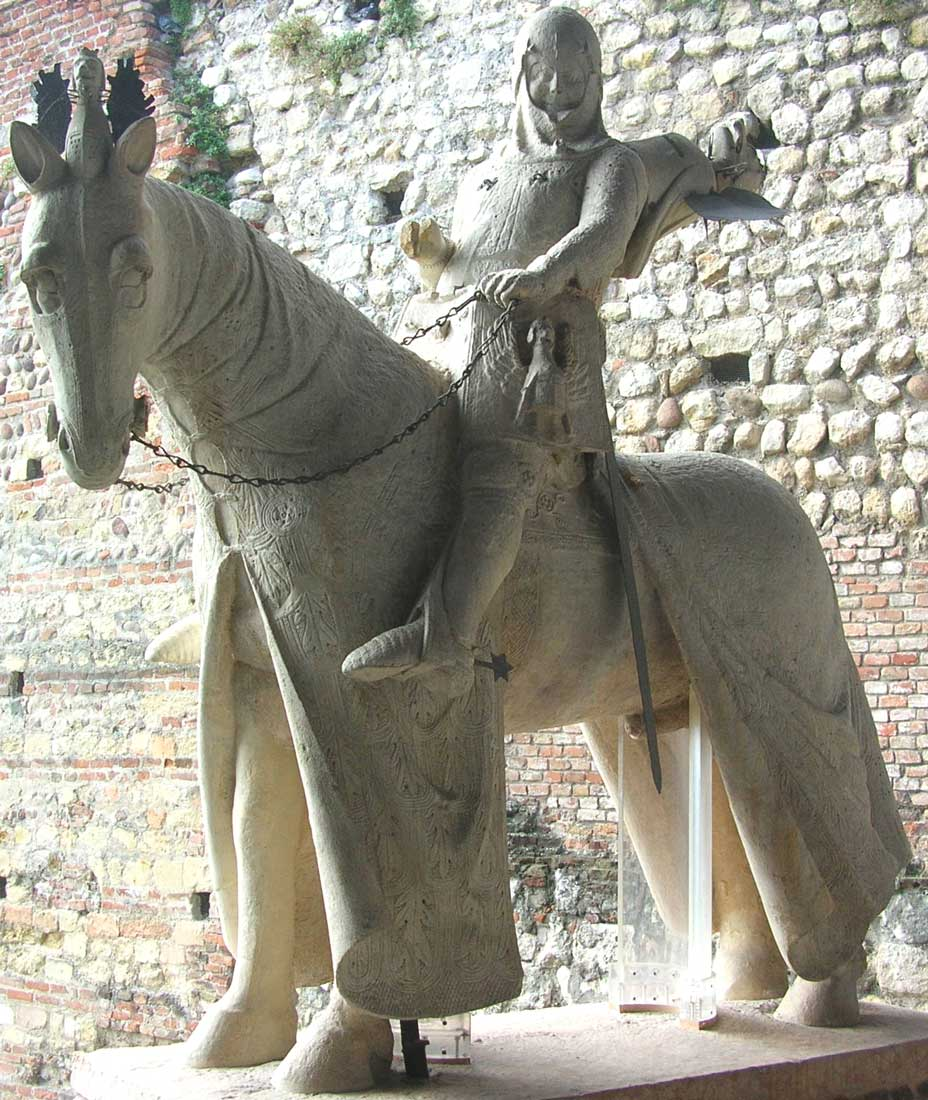
The original statue of Cangrande I (14th century), now replaced by a copy. Scaliger Tombs in Verona

Equestrian statues were not very frequent in the Middle Ages. Nevertheless, there are some examples, like the Bamberg Horseman (German: Der Bamberger Reiter), in Bamberg Cathedral. Another example is the Magdeburg Reiter, in the city of Magdeburg, that depicts Emperor Otto I. This is in stone, which is fairly unusual at any period, though the Gothic statues at less than life-size at the Scaliger Tombs in Verona are also in stone.

There are a few roughly half-size statues of Saint George and the Dragon, including the famous ones in Prague and Stockholm. A well-known small bronze equestrian statuette of Charlemagne (or another emperor) in Paris may be a contemporary portrait of Charlemagne, although its date and subject are uncertain.

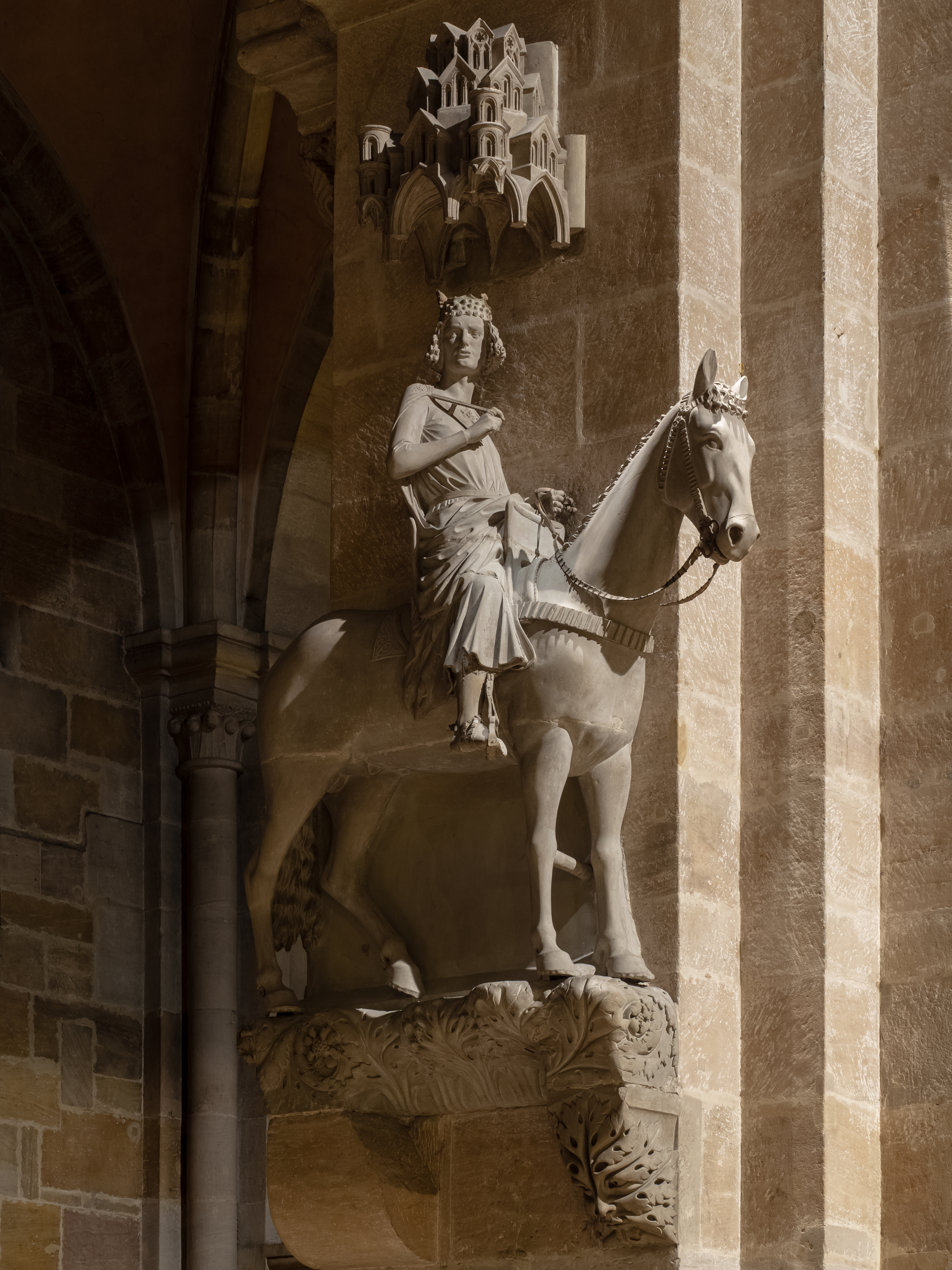
Bamberg Horseman (1225–1237), Bamberg Cathedral, stone

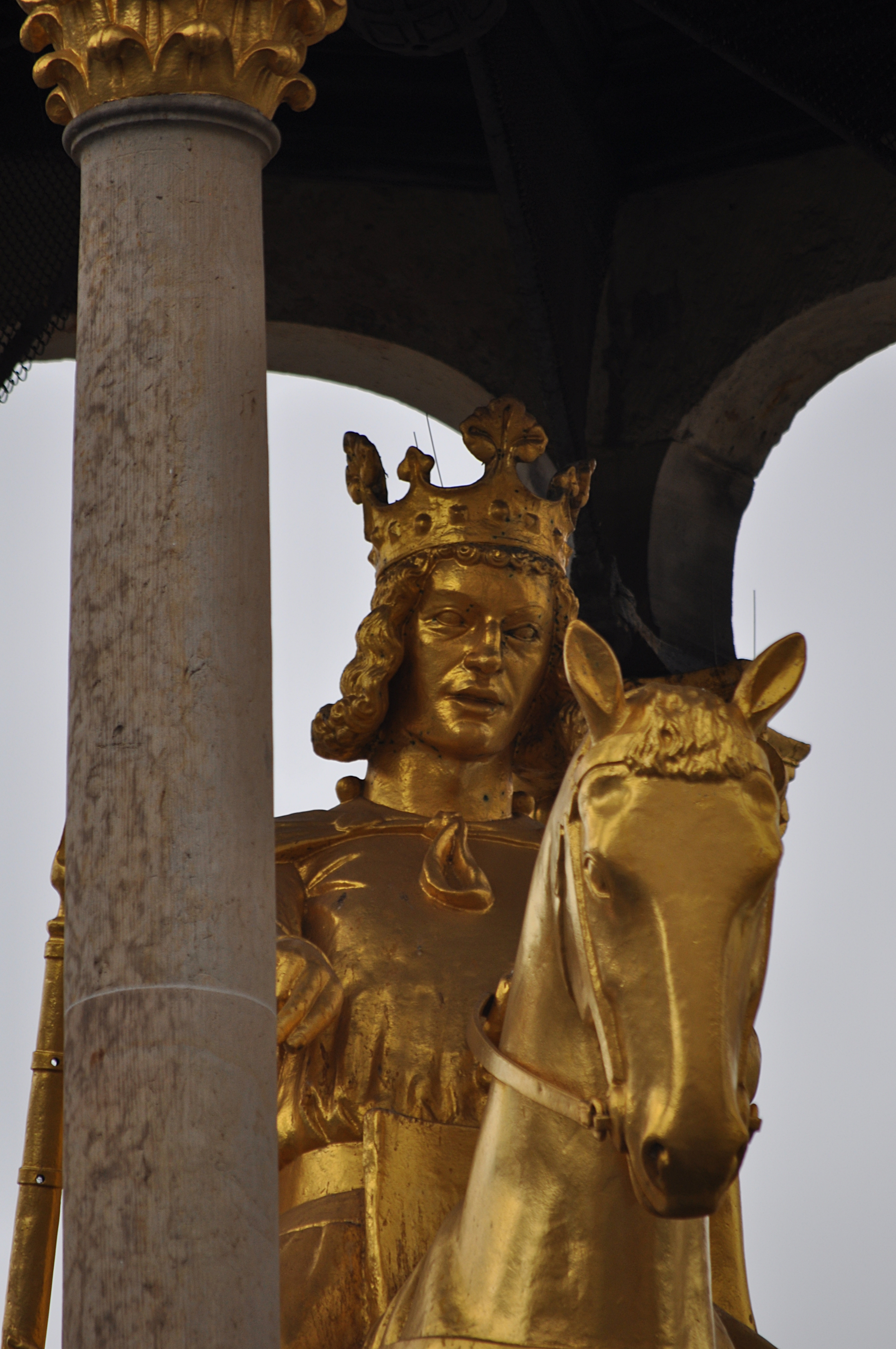
Magdeburg Horseman (1240), Magdeburg

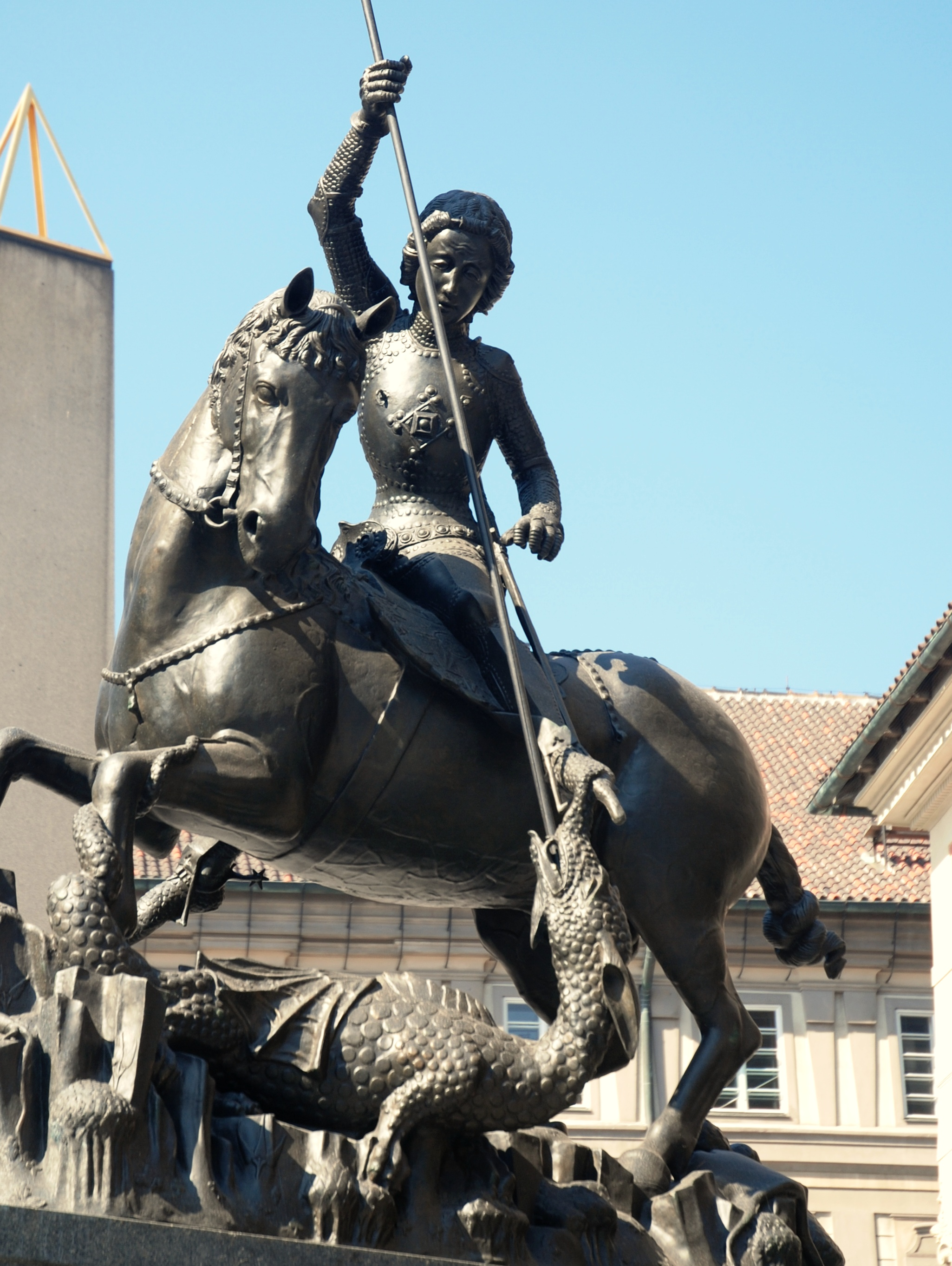
St. George and Dragon (1373), Prague

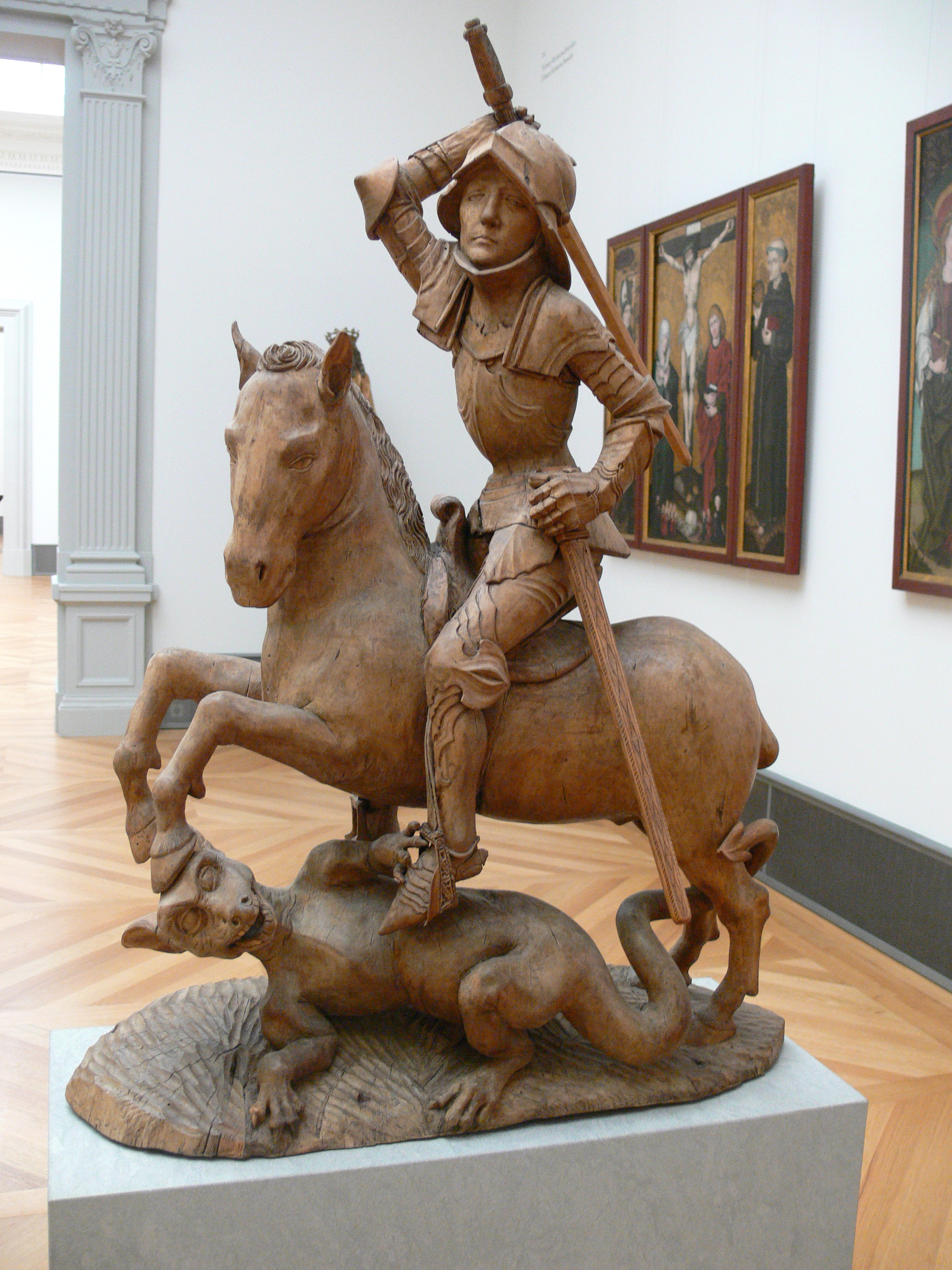
Tilman Riemenschneider, Saint George (1490–1495) in limewood, Bode Museum

=== Renaissance ===
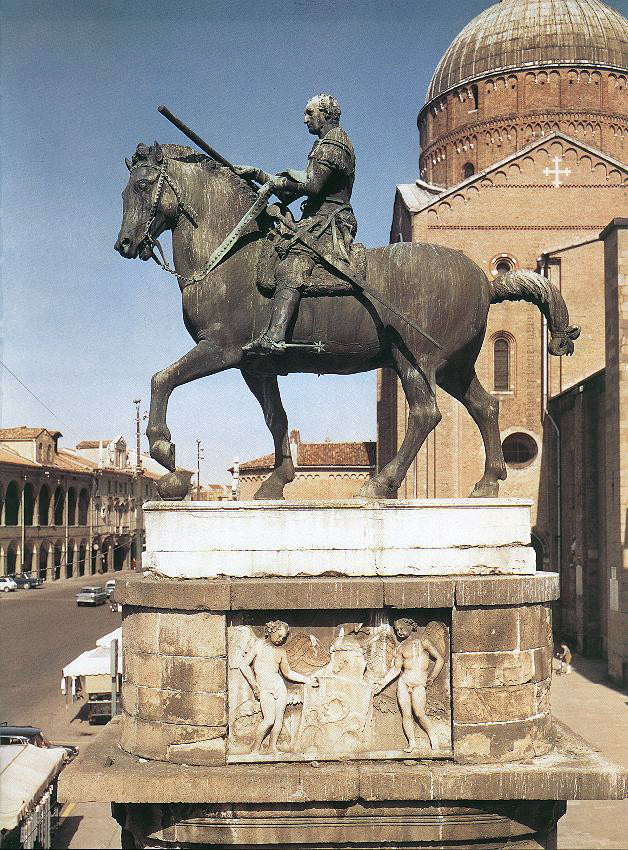
Donatello: Statue of Gattamelata (1444–1453)

After the Romans, no surviving monumental equestrian bronze was cast in Europe until 1415–1450, when Donatello created the heroic bronze equestrian statue of Gattamelata the condottiere, erected in Padua. In fifteenth-century Italy, this became a form to memorialize successful mercenary generals, as evidenced by the painted equestrian funerary monuments to Sir John Hawkwood and Niccolò da Tolentino in Florence Cathedral, and the statue of Bartolomeo Colleoni (1478–1488) cast by Verrocchio in Venice.

Leonardo da Vinci had planned a colossal equestrian monument to the Milanese ruler, Francesco Sforza, but was only able to create a clay model. The bronze was reallocated for military use in the First Italian War. Similar sculptures have survived in small scale: The Wax Horse and Rider (c. 1506–1508) is a fragmentary model for an equestrian statue of Charles d'Amboise. The Rearing Horse and Mounted Warrior in bronze was also attributed to Leonardo.

Titian's equestrian portrait of Charles V, Holy Roman Emperor, of 1548 applied the form again to a ruler. The equestrian statue of Cosimo I de' Medici (1598) by Giambologna in the center of Florence was a life size representation of the Grand-Duke, erected by his son Ferdinand I.

Ferdinand himself would be memorialized in 1608 with an equestrian statue in Piazza della Annunziata was completed by Giambologna's assistant, Pietro Tacca. Tacca's studio would produce such models for the rulers in France and Spain. His last public commission was the colossal equestrian bronze of Philip IV, begun in 1634 and shipped to Madrid in 1640. In Tacca's sculpture, atop a fountain composition that forms the centerpiece of the façade of the Royal Palace, the horse rears, and the entire weight of the sculpture balances on the two rear legs, and discreetly, its tail, a novel feat for a statue of this size.

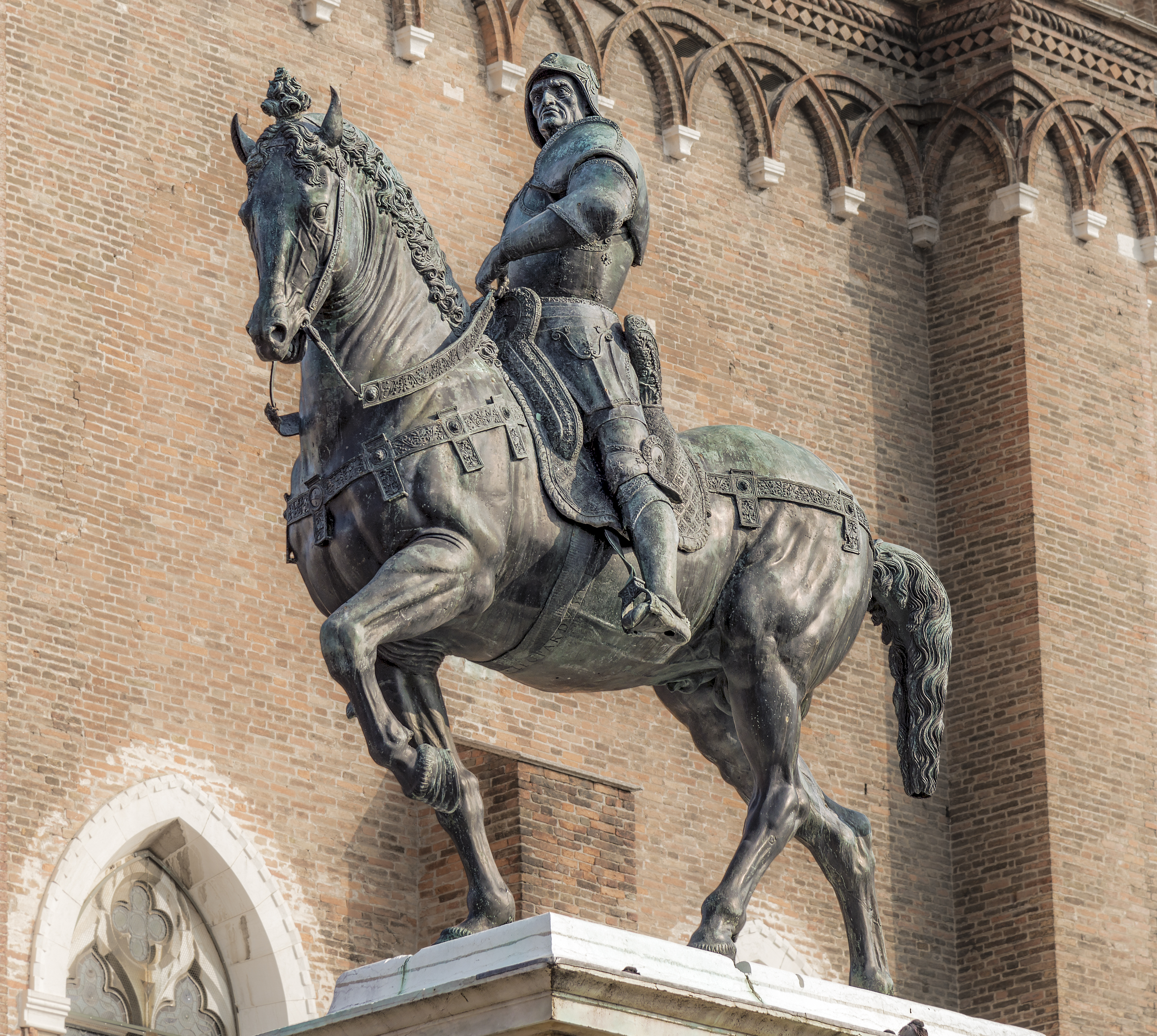
Verrocchio: Equestrian statue of Bartolomeo Colleoni (1480–1495)

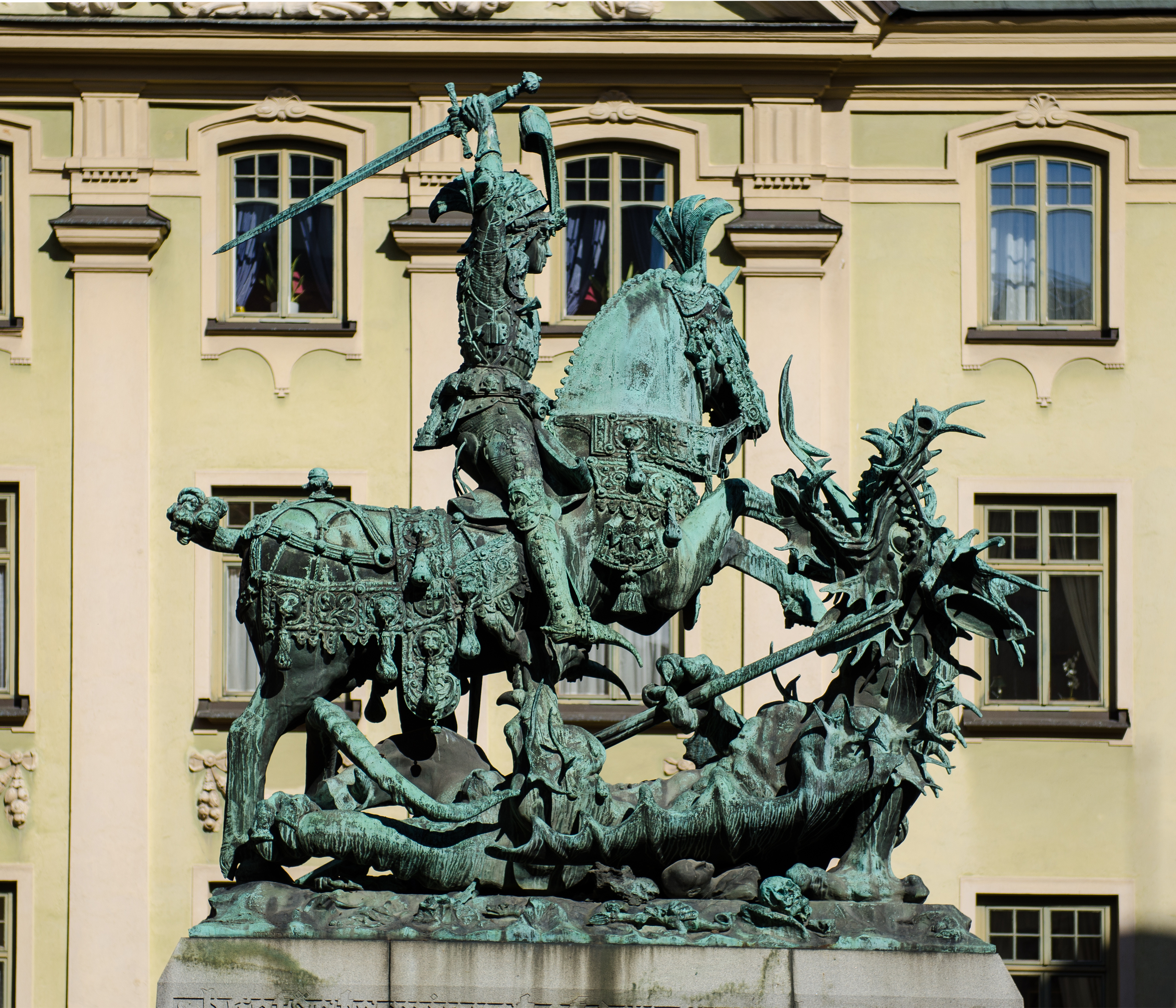
Bernt Notke: St George and the Dragon (1489), bronze replica of wooden sculpture, Stockholm

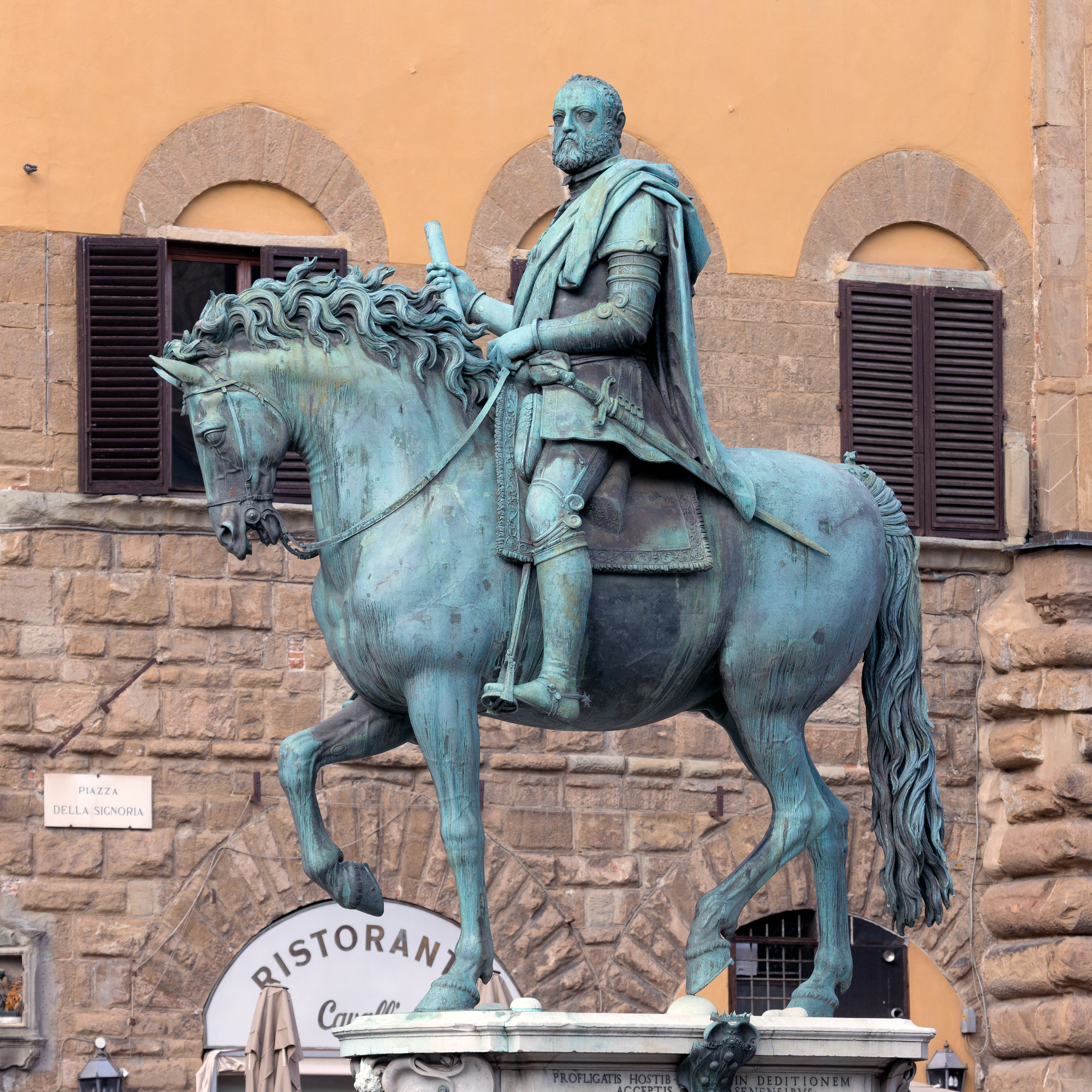
Giambologna: Equestrian statue of Cosimo I (1598)

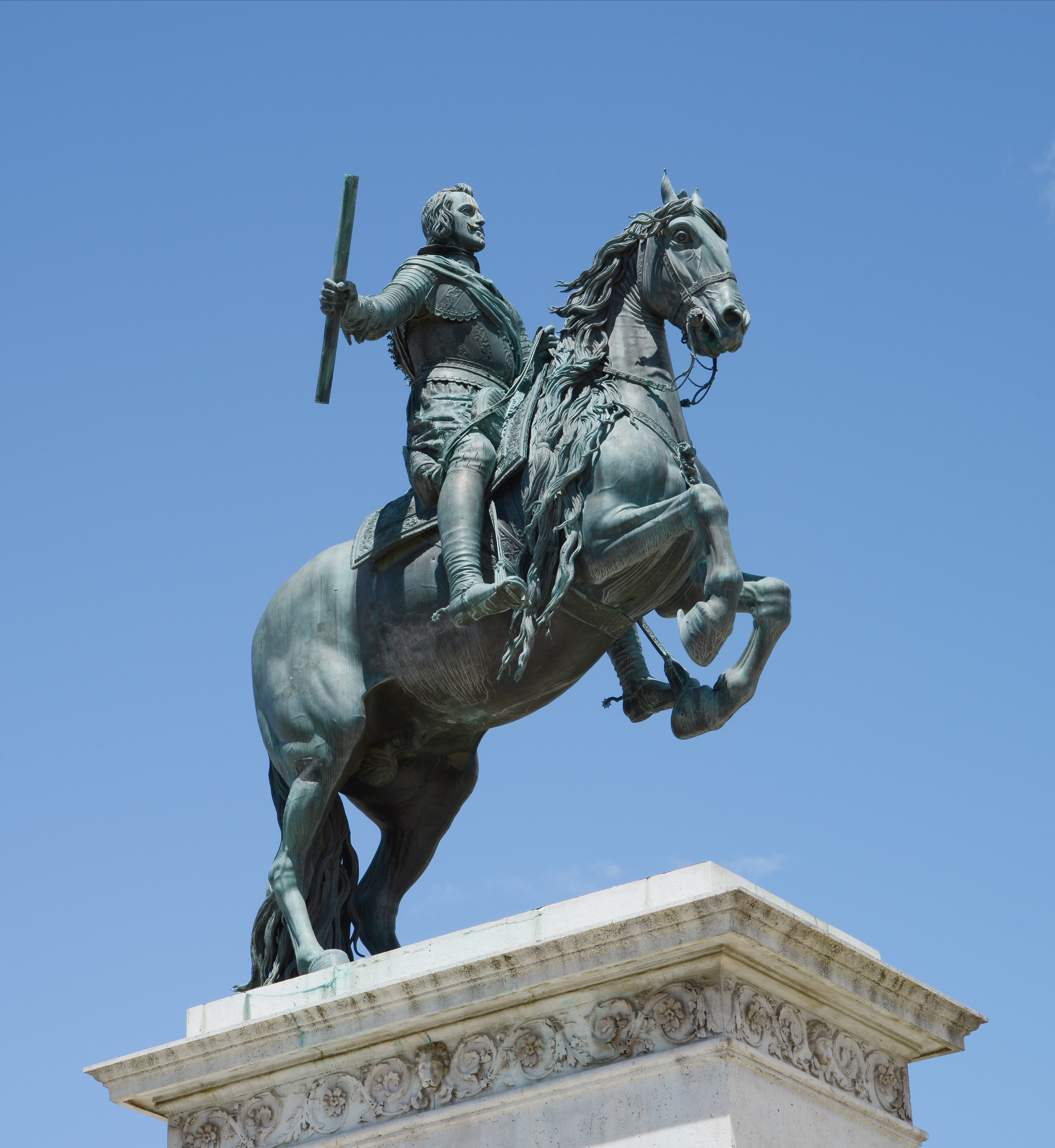
Pietro Tacca: Monument to Philip IV of Spain (1634–1640)

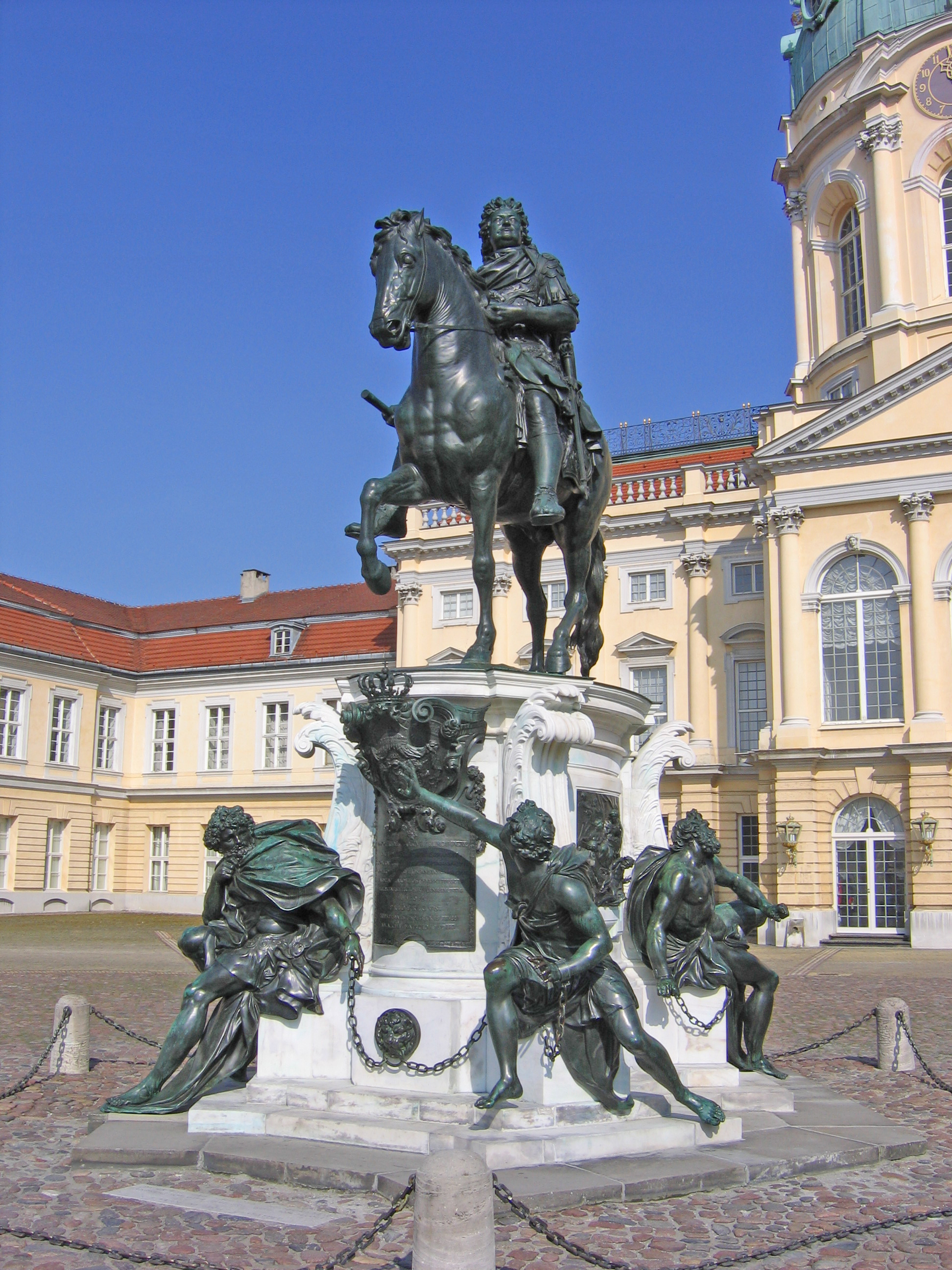
Frederick William, Elector of Brandenburg, built 1696–1703

=== Absolutism ===
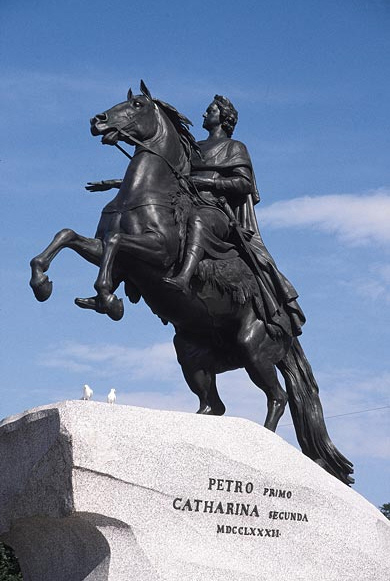
The Bronze Horseman by Étienne Maurice Falconet (1768–1782)

During the age of Absolutism, especially in France, equestrian statues were popular with rulers; Louis XIV was typical in having one outside his Palace of Versailles, and the over life-size statue in the Place des Victoires in Paris by François Girardon (1699) is supposed to be the first large modern equestrian statue to be cast in a single piece; it was destroyed in the French Revolution, though there is a small version in the Louvre. The near life-size equestrian statue of Charles I of England by Hubert Le Sueur of 1633 at Charing Cross in London is the earliest large English example, which was followed by many.

The equestrian statue of King José I of Portugal, in the Praça do Comércio, was designed by Joaquim Machado de Castro after the 1755 Lisbon earthquake and is a pinnacle of Absolutist age statues in Europe. The Bronze Horseman (Russian: Медный всадник, literally "The Copper Horseman") is an iconic equestrian statue, on a huge base, of Peter the Great of 1782 by Étienne Maurice Falconet in Saint Petersburg, Russia. The use of French artists for both examples demonstrates the slow spread of the skills necessary for creating large works, but by the nineteenth century most large Western countries could produce them without the need to import skills, and most statues of earlier figures are actually from the nineteenth or early twentieth century.

=== United States ===
In the colonial era, an equestrian statue of George III by English sculptor Joseph Wilton stood on Bowling Green in New York City. This was the first such statue in the United States, erected in 1770 but destroyed on July 9, 1776, six days after the Declaration of Independence. The 4,000-pound (1,800 kg) gilded lead statue was toppled and cut into pieces, which were made into bullets for use in the American Revolutionary War. Some fragments survived and in 2016 the statue was recreated for a museum.

In the United States, the first three full-scale equestrian sculptures erected were Clark Mills' Andrew Jackson (1852) in Washington, D.C.; Henry Kirke Brown's George Washington (1856) in New York City; and Thomas Crawford's George Washington in Richmond, Virginia (1858). Mills was the first American sculptor to overcome the challenge of casting a rider on a rearing horse. The resulting sculpture (of Jackson) was so popular he repeated it for New Orleans, Nashville, and Jacksonville.

Cyrus Edwin Dallin made a specialty of equestrian sculptures of American Indians: his Appeal to the Great Spirit stands before the Museum of Fine Arts, Boston. The Robert Gould Shaw Memorial in Boston is a well-known relief including an equestrian portrait.

=== Twentieth century ===
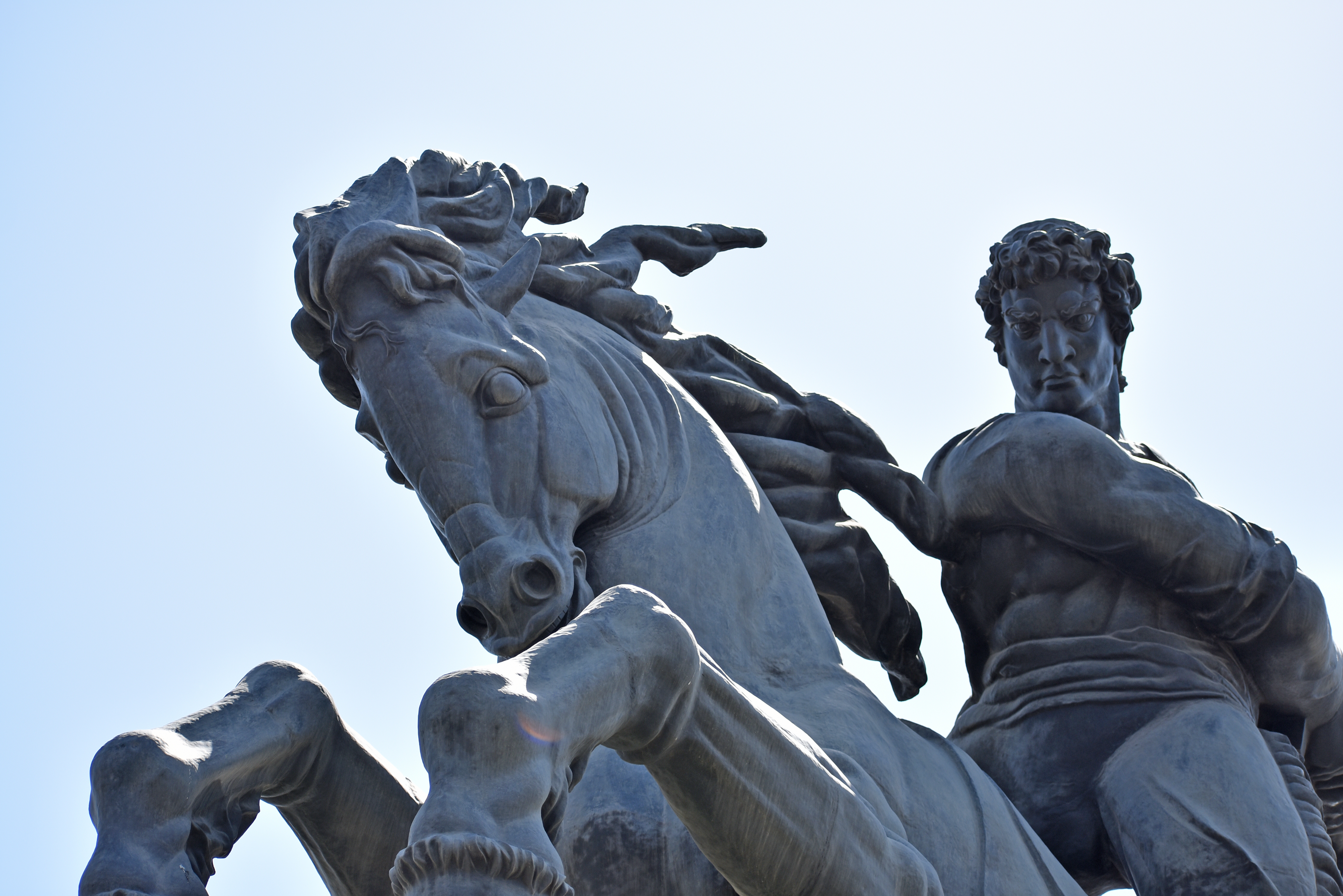
Statue of David of Sassoun, by Yervand Kochar

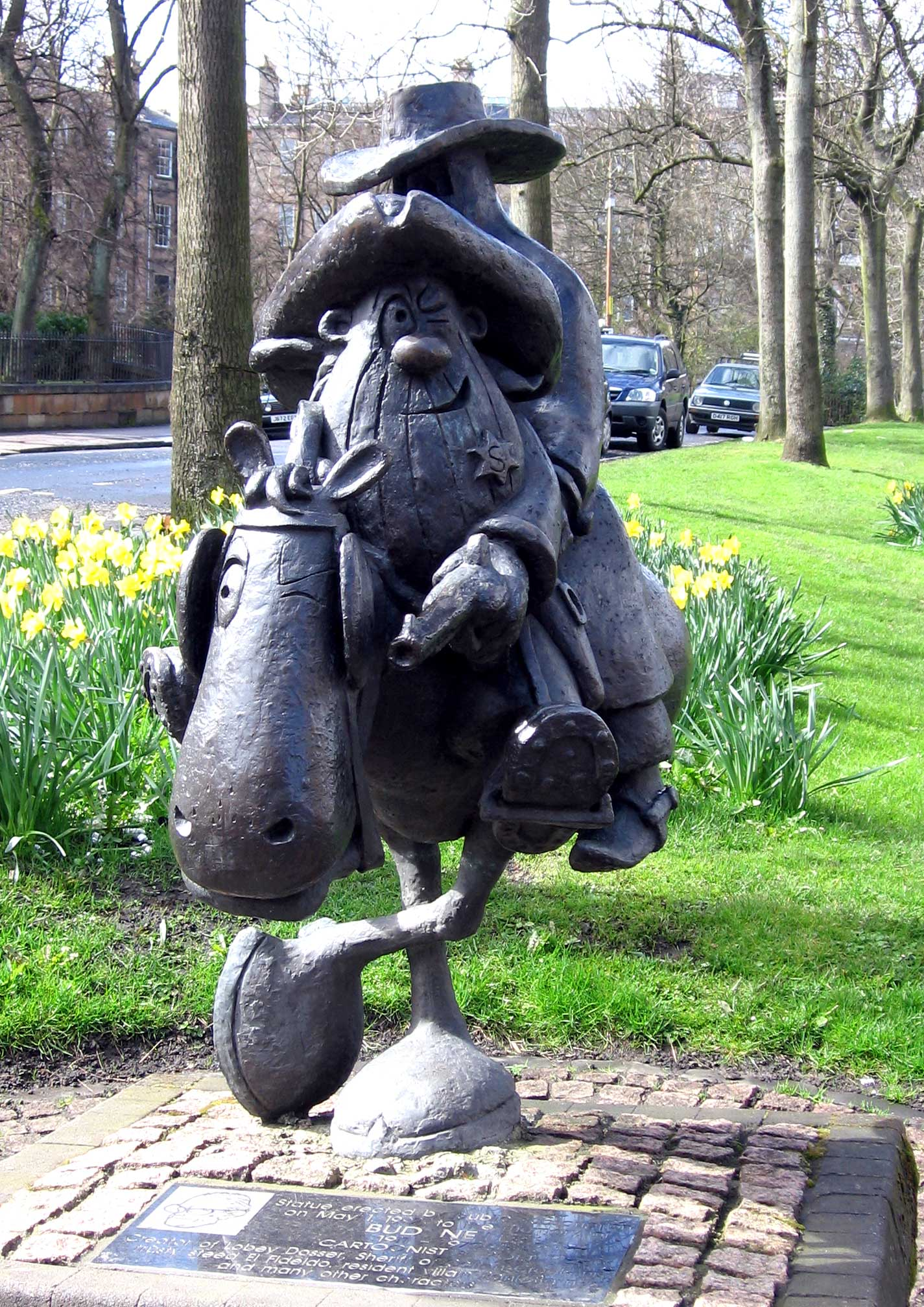
Lobey Dosser (and Rank Bajin) on El Fidelio, commemorating Bud Neill

As the twentieth century progressed, the popularity of the equestrian monument declined sharply, as monarchies fell and the military use of horses virtually vanished. The statue of Queen Elizabeth II riding Burmese in Canada, and statues of Rani Lakshmibai in Gwalior and Jhansi, India, are some of the rare portrait statues with female riders. (Although Joan of Arc has been so portrayed a number of times, and an equestrian statue of Queen Victoria features prominently in George Square, Glasgow). In America, the late 1970s and early 1980s witnessed something of a revival in equestrian monuments, largely in the Southwestern United States. There, art centers such as Loveland, Colorado, Shidoni Foundry in New Mexico, and various studios in Texas once again began producing equestrian sculpture.

These revival works fall into two general categories, the memorialization of a particular individual or the portrayal of general figures, notably the American cowboy or Native Americans. Such monuments can be found throughout the American Southwest.

In Glasgow, the sculpture of Lobey Dosser on El Fidelio, erected in tribute to Bud Neill, is claimed to be the only two-legged equestrian statue in the world.

== Tallest and largest equestrian statue ==
Equestrian statue of Genghis Khan, Ulaanbaarar, Mongolia

The current largest is the 40-meter-tall equestrian statue of Genghis Khan at Boldog, 54 km from Ulaanbaatar, Mongolia, where, according to legend, Genghis Khan found the golden whip. Formerly, the monument to general Jose Gervasio Artigas in Minas, Uruguay (18 meters tall, 9 meters long, 150,000 kg), was the world's largest equestrian statue until 2008.

The world's largest equestrian sculpture, if completed, would be the Crazy Horse Memorial in South Dakota, at a planned 641 feet (195 m) wide and 563 feet (172 m) high, though only the upper torso and head of the rider and front half of the horse will be depicted.

== Other statues of particular note ==
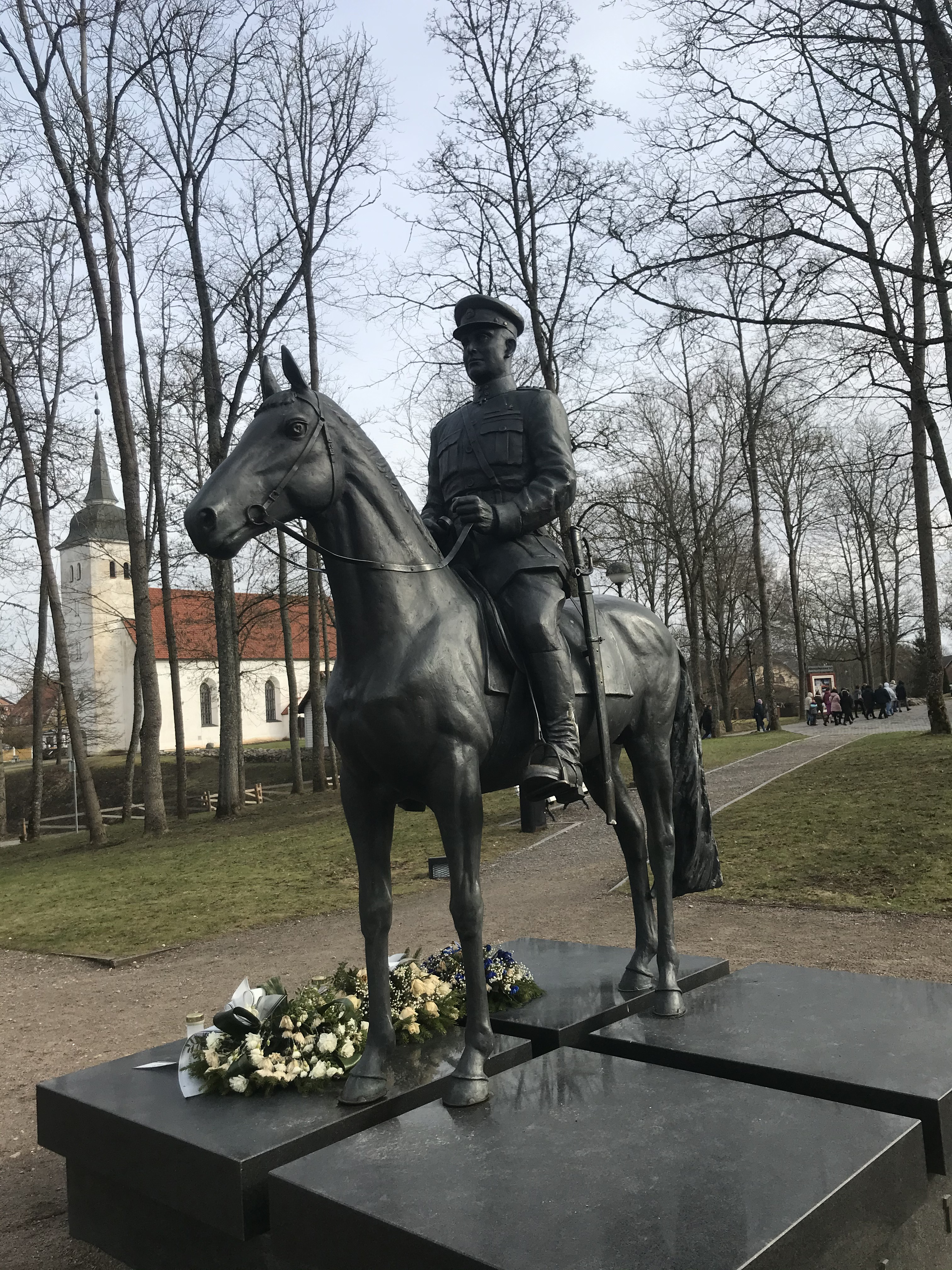
Equestrian statue of General Johan Laidoner in Viljandi, Estonia

- Memorial at Vlamertinge to commemorate the one million horses killed in WW1
- Memorial of Captain Edward Cheney at Gaddesby showing him on a dying horse – he had five horses shot out from under him at the Battle of Waterloo and led the charge of the Royal Scots Greys – the only equestrian statue in a British church
- Memorial to "Crimean Bob" the last horse to die following service at the Battle of Waterloo, in Cahir
- The Kelpies, pair of 30m high horse heads near Falkirk in Scotland

== Hoof-position symbolism ==
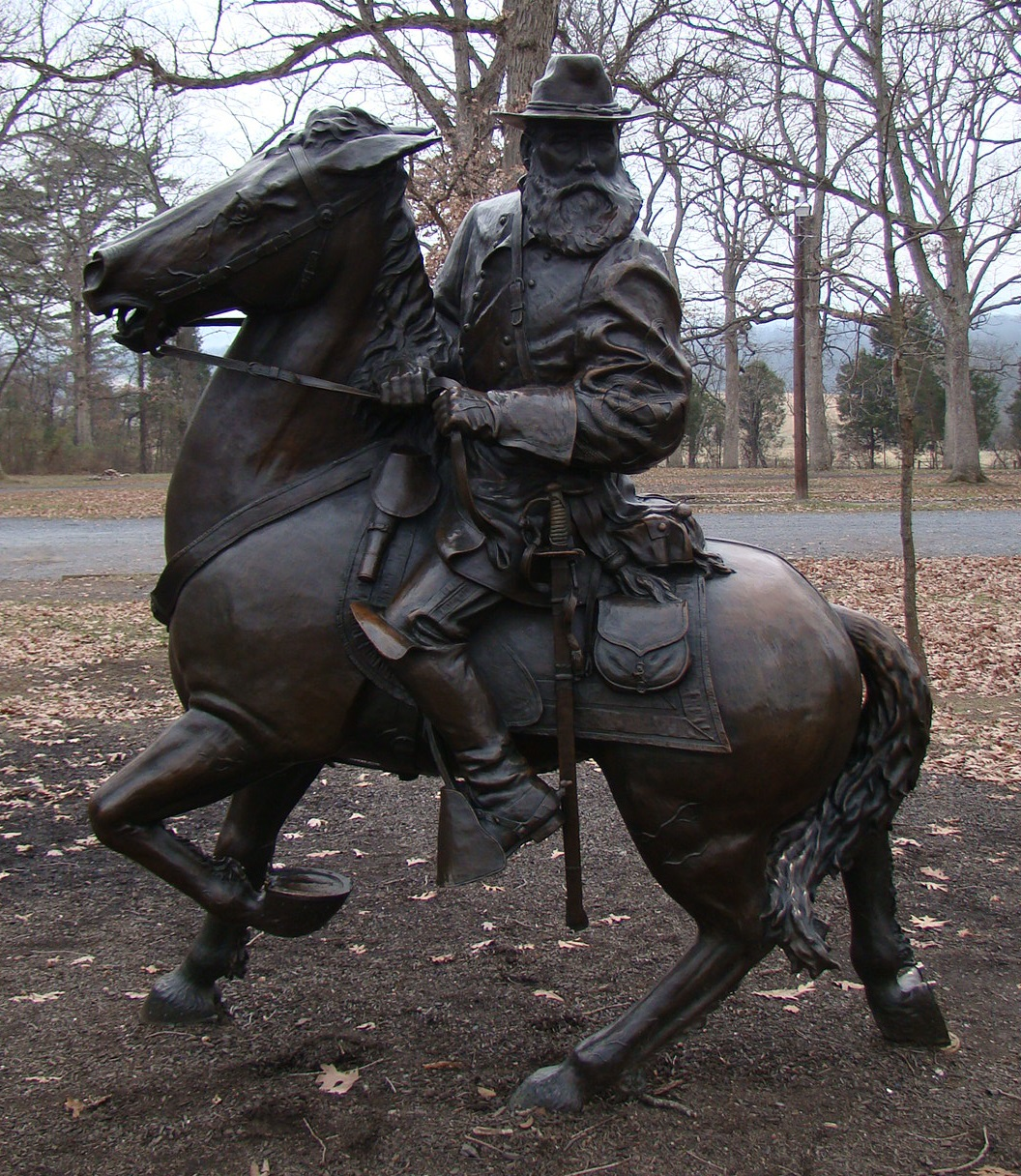
Equestrian statue of Confederate General James Longstreet on his horse Hero in Pitzer Woods at Gettysburg National Military Park, Gettysburg, PA

In many parts of the world, an urban legend states that if the horse is rearing (both front legs in the air), the rider died in battle; one front leg up means the rider was wounded in battle; and if all four hooves are on the ground, the rider died outside battle. A rider depicted as dismounted and standing next to their horse often indicates that both were killed during battle. For example, Richard the Lionheart is memorialised, mounted passant, outside the Palace of Westminster by Carlo Marochetti; the former died 11 days after his wound, sustained in siege, turned septic. A survey of 15 equestrian statues in central London by the Londonist website found that nine of them corresponded to the supposed rule, and considered it "not a reliable system for reading the fate of any particular rider".

In the United States, the rule is especially held to apply to equestrian statues commemorating the American Civil War and the Battle of Gettysburg. One such statue was erected in 1998 in Gettysburg National Military Park, and is of James Longstreet, who is featured on his horse with one foot raised, even though Longstreet was not wounded in that battle. However, he was seriously wounded in the Battle of the Wilderness the following year. This is not a traditional statue, as it does not place him on a pedestal. One writer claims that any correlation between the positioning of hooves in a statue and the manner in which a Gettysburg soldier died is a coincidence. There is no proper evidence that these hoof positions correlate consistently with the rider's history but some hold to the belief regardless.

== See also ==
- Category:Lists of equestrian statues
- List of equestrian statues

== Bibliography ==
- Joachim Poeschke, Thomas Weigel, Britta Kusch-Arnhold (eds.), Praemium Virtutis III – Reiterstandbilder von der Antike bis zum Klassizismus. Rhema-Verlag, Münster 2008, ISBN 978-3-930454-59-4
- Raphael Beuing: Reiterbilder der Frührenaissance – Monument und Memoria. Rhema-Verlag, Münster 2010, ISBN 978-3-930454-88-4
