= Fontana dei mostri marini =

Fountains in Florence, Italy

Fontane dei mostri marini
- Sea monster fountains
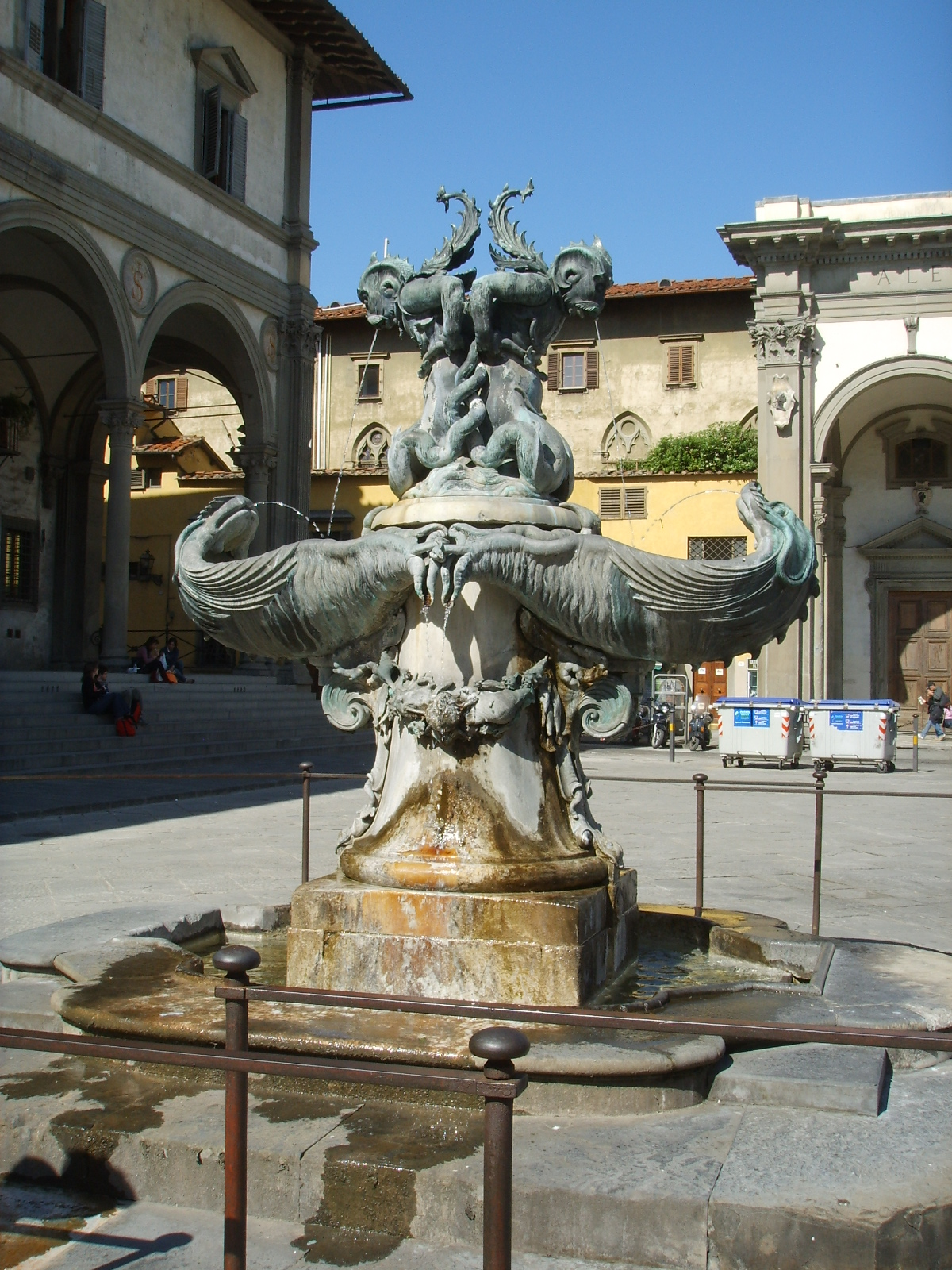
- Artist: Pietro Tacca
- Year: circa 1627-1641
- Medium: Bronze sculpture
- Location: Piazza della Santissima Annunziata, Florence

The two fontane dei mostri marini ("sea monster fountains") are located in the Piazza della Santissima Annunziata in Florence, Italy.

== History ==
The two fountains were placed in 1641 at the sides of the Santissima Annunziata plaza, having been commissioned in 1626. The statues were originally intended to complement the Monument of the Four Moors in Livorno. To this end, artist Pietro Tacca began to work on them in 1627 with the help of two students: Bartolomeo Salvini and Francesco Maria Bandini.

In 1641, following the death of Tacca, the fountains were placed in the Santissima Annunziata plaza on opposite sides of the Equestrian Monument of Ferdinando I.

The fountains were restored in 1987 and 1988, and again between May and June 1996 by Giovanni Morigi under the direction of the Carlo Francini Office of Fine Arts of the City of Florence. Despite these efforts, the statues again began to show signs of material degradation and the fountains were eventually shut down. In 2013, money obtained by the Municipality of Public Land Concession for Special Initiatives was used to initiate a new restorative effort.

== Description ==
These two fountains are considered masterpieces among Mannerist sculptures for their beauty and balance, using contemporary marine symbology (such as seashells, fish, legendary monsters, garlands of shellfish and algae, and masks) alongside traditional maritime themes and symbols. As emphasized, for example, by Giuseppe Richa in Notizie Istoriche delle chiese fiorentine (XVIII secolo), it was unconventional that sprays of water would not be directed upwards, but sometimes come out from mouths of the monsters directed downwards.

Pietro Tacca's signature (PETRUS TACC F.) can be found on both fountains; this is most easily read with one's back to the basilica.

== Gallery ==
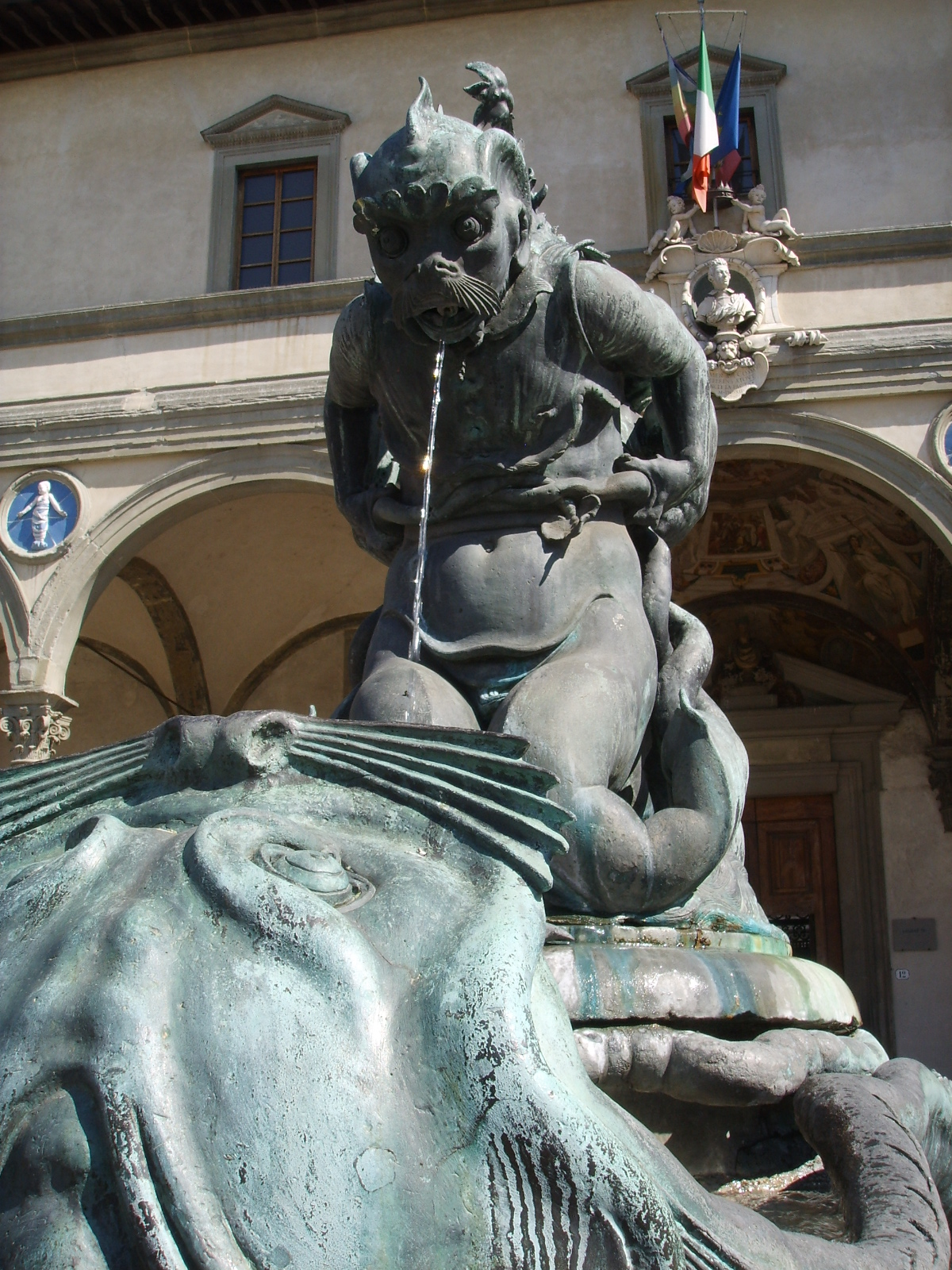
Detail of the sea monster

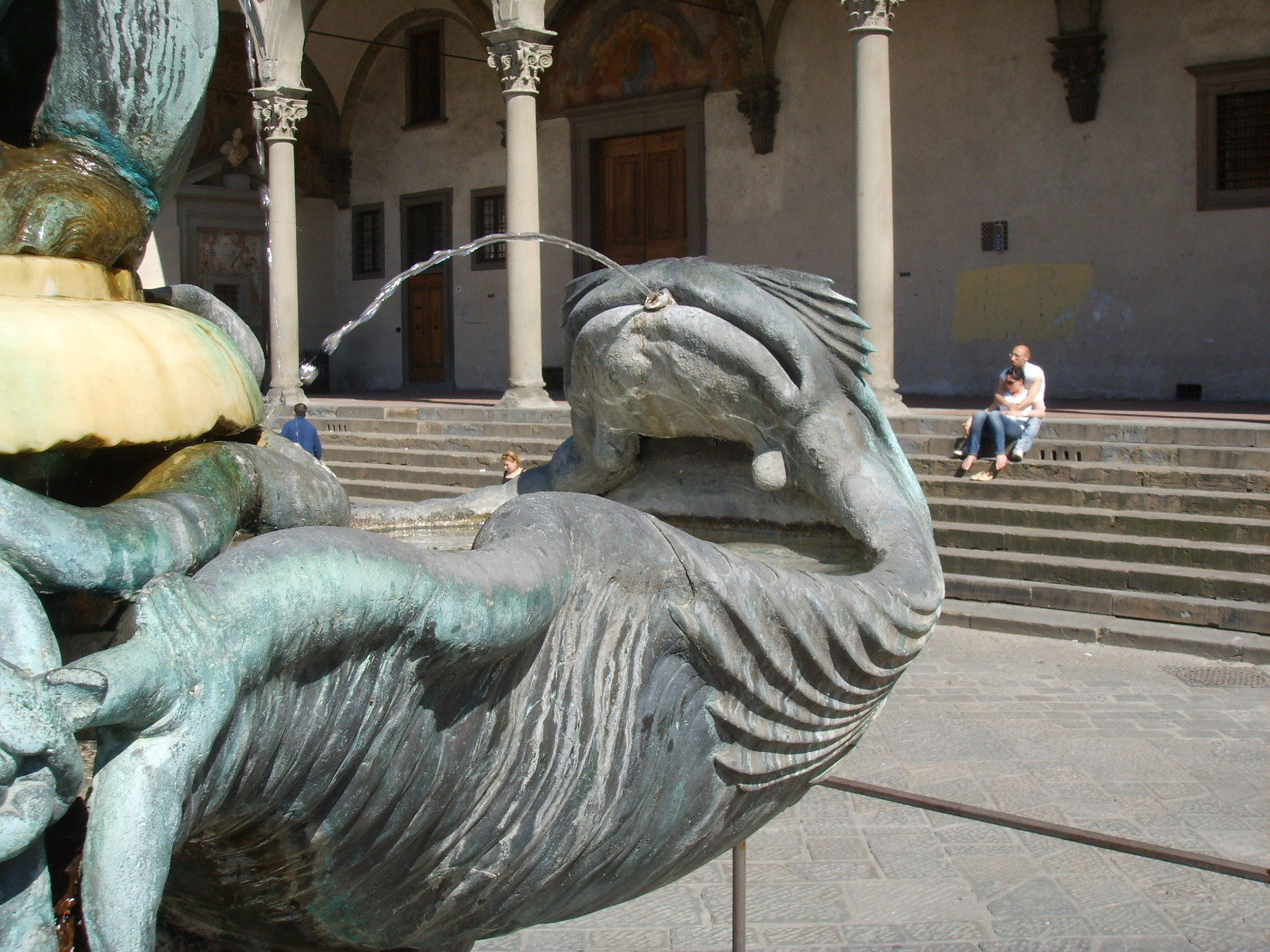
Detail of the tank

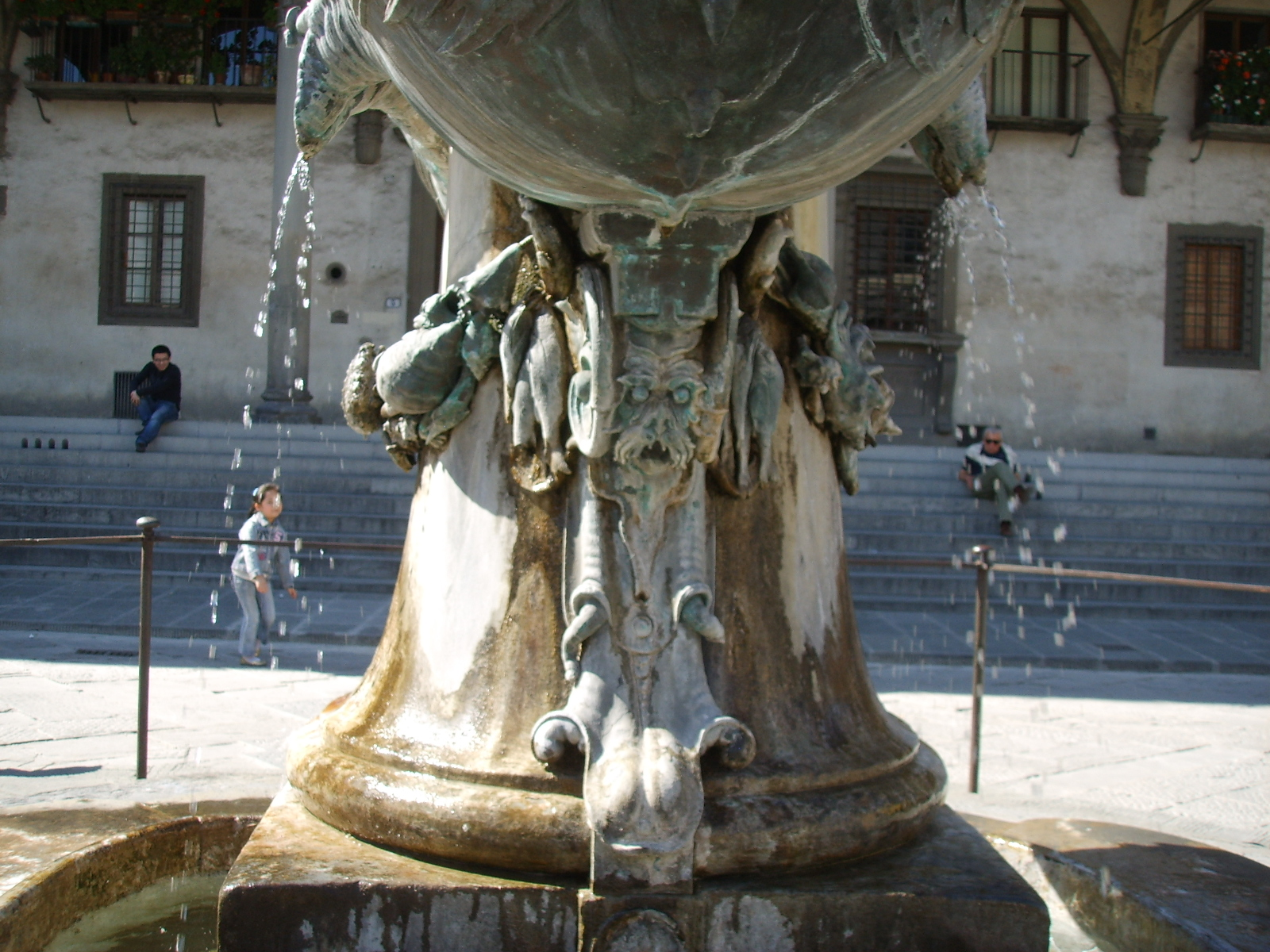
Detail of the base

== See also ==
- Pietro Tacca
- Equestrian Monument of Cosimo I (Florence)
- Equestrian Monument of Ferdinando I (Florence)
- Monument of the Four Moors (Livorno)
