= Piazza della Santissima Annunziata =

Square in Florence, Italy

Coordinates: 43°46′35.21″N 11°15′38.64″E

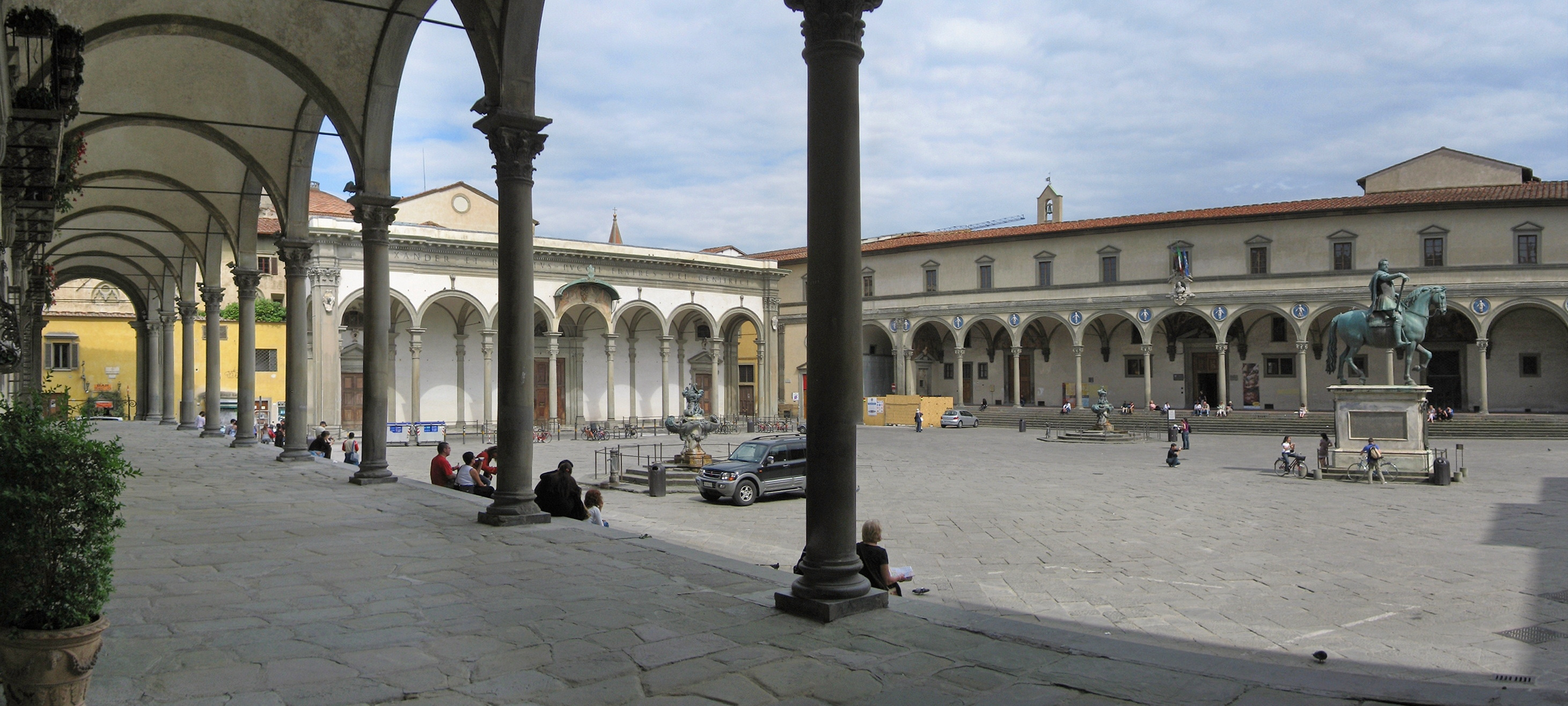
Piazza della Santissima Annunziata from the arcades of the Loggia dei Servi di Maria

The Piazza della Santissima Annunziata is a square in the city of Florence, the capital city of Tuscany in central Italy. The piazza is named after the Basilica della Santissima Annunziata at the head of the square facing via dei Servi, which leads to the Cathedral.

The model for the arcades framing the square on three sides was provided by the Ospedale degli Innocenti, a 15th-century foundling hospital sponsored by a civic donation. The complex was initially designed by Filippo Brunelleschi, the father of Renaissance architecture and builder of the cathedral's dome. The hospital is one of the first of its kind, in function and in style. Still in use today it also houses the Museo degli Innocenti. Adjacent on its other end, is the entrance to the National Archeological Museum.

On the opposing side the square is enclosed by the Loggia dei Servi di Maria, with a facade mirroring the one of the ospedale. Built in the 1520s by Antonio da Sangallo the Elder, it served the order of the Servites, of which the Annunziata church is their founding place.

Slightly off the piazza's center stands the bronze Equestrian statue of Ferdinando I facing the cathedral. It is a work by Giambologna, executed in 1602–1607, while the Fontane dei mostri marini, the two Mannerist fountains with fantastical figures, are the work of his pupil Pietro Tacca.

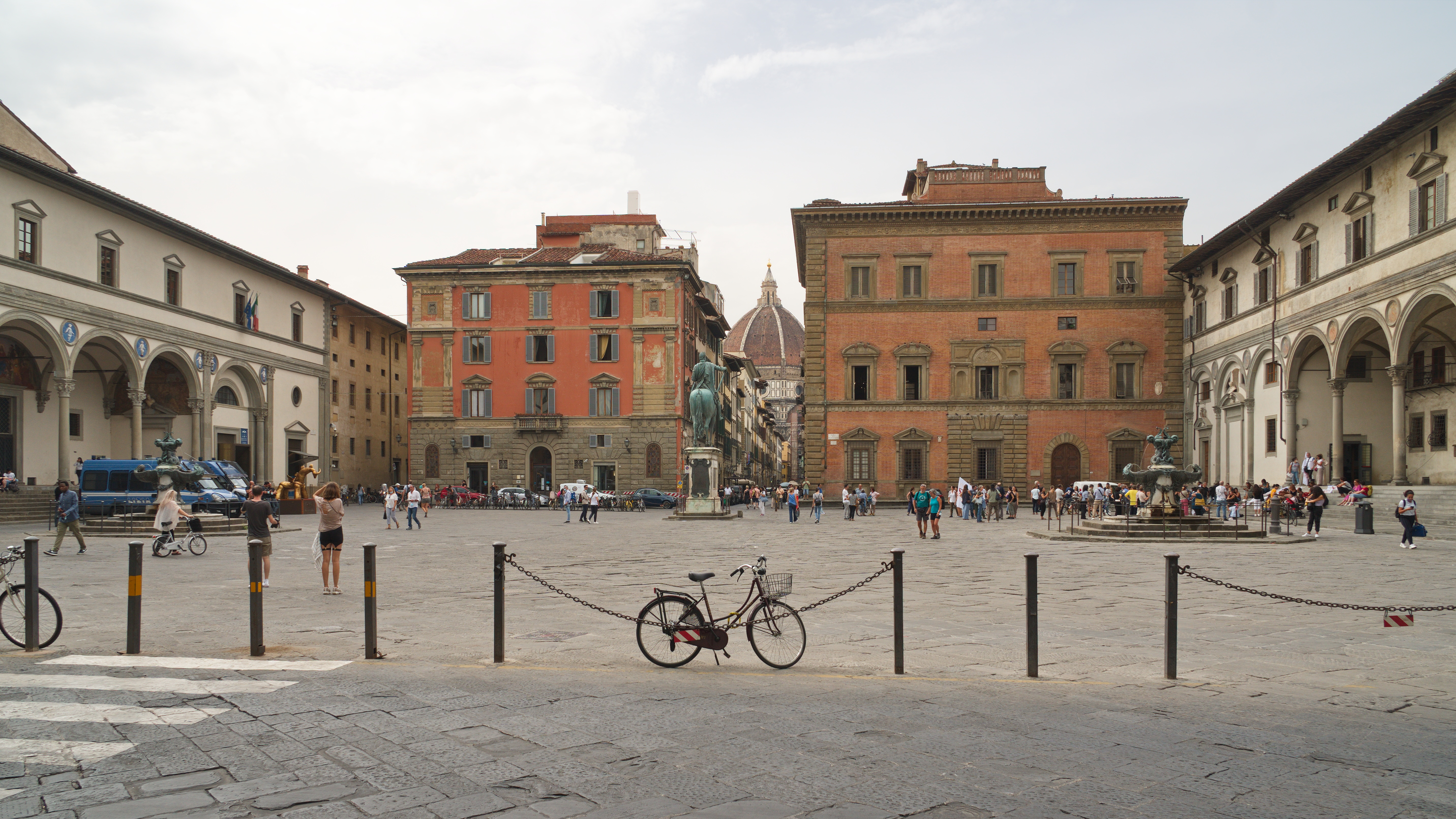
SW view towards the Cathedral, with Palazzi delle due Fontane and Budini Gattai

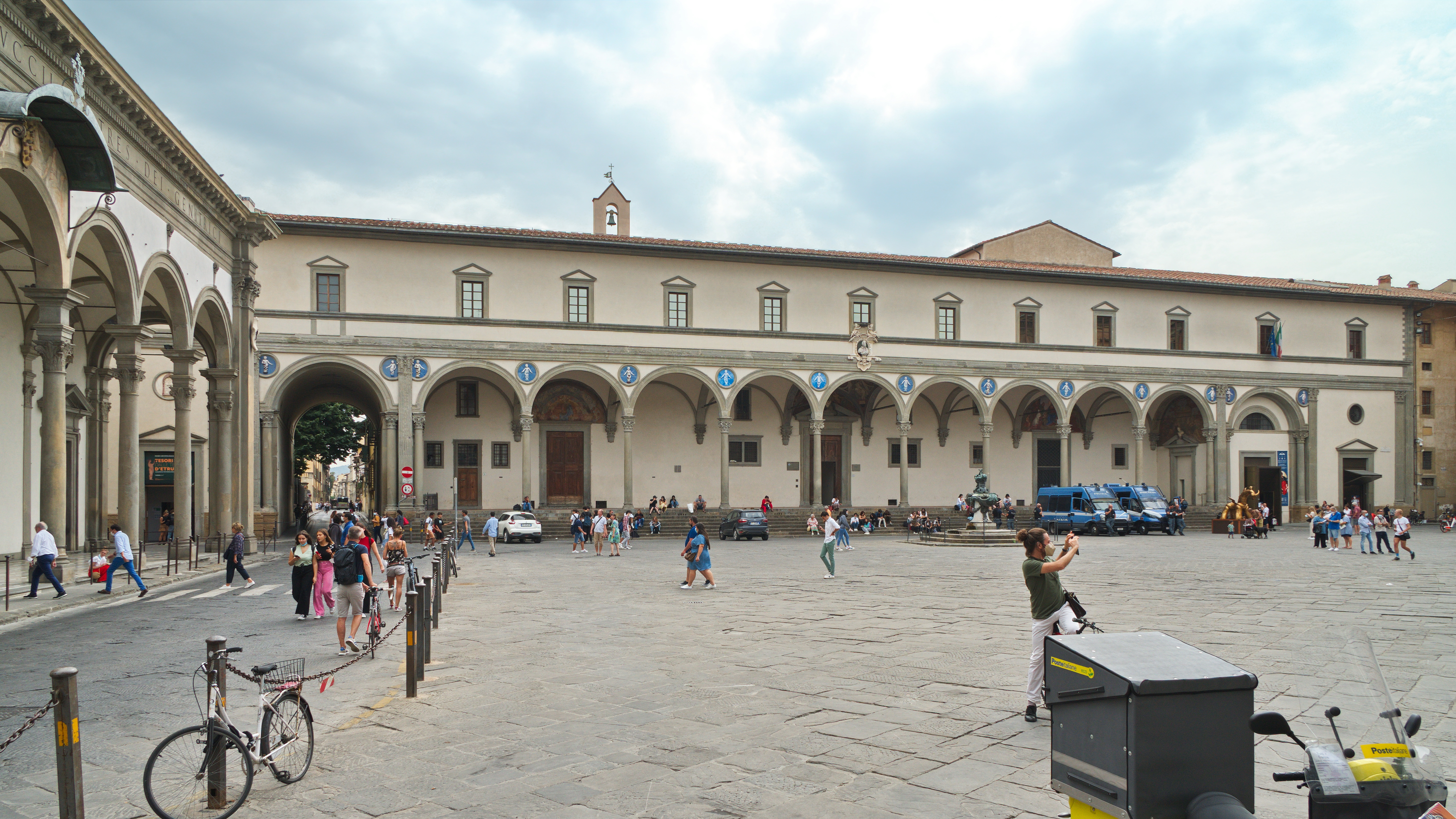
Ospedale degli Innocenti by Filippo Brunelleschi (1419–39)

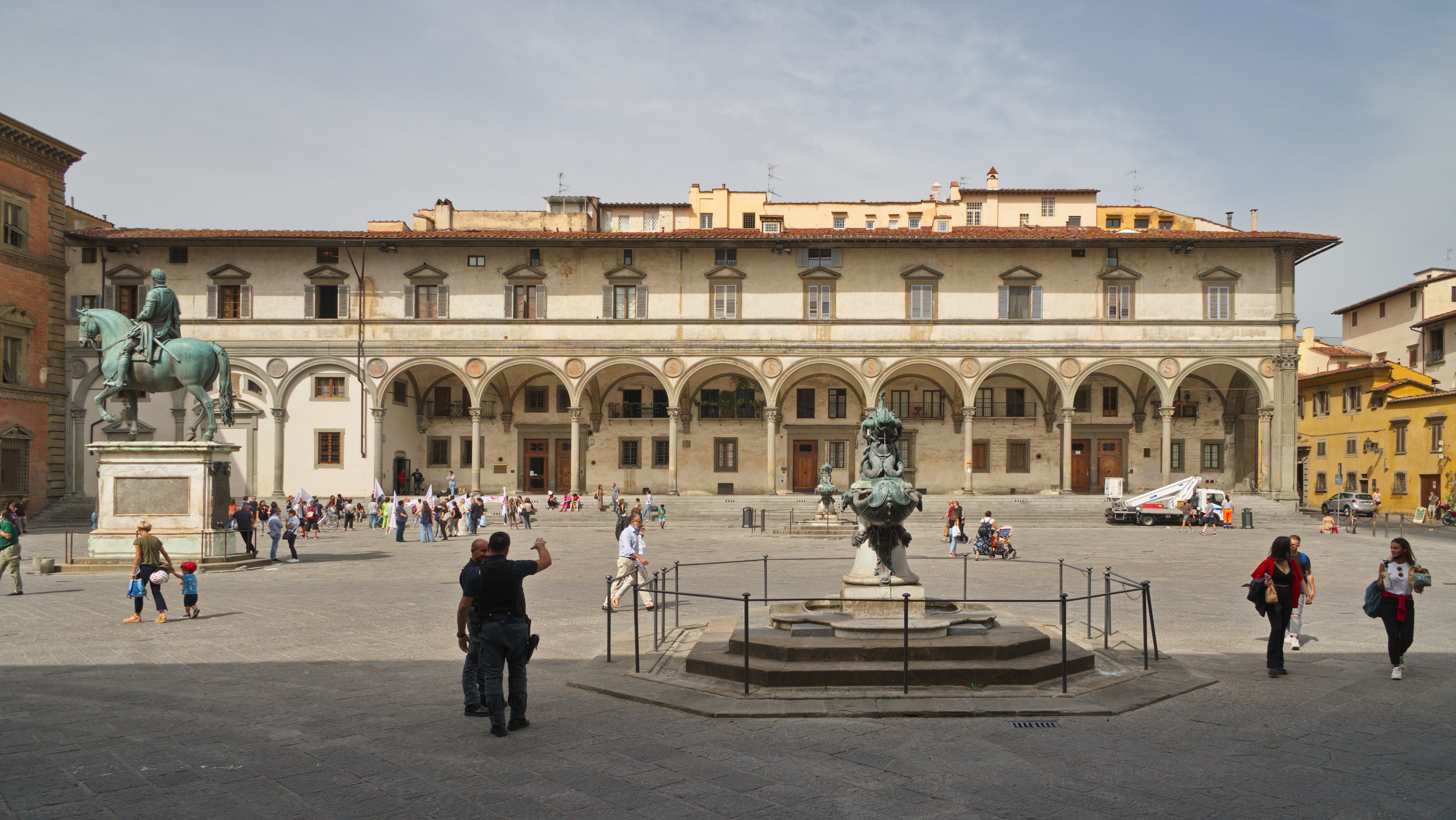
Loggia dei Servi di Maria by Antonio da Sangallo the Elder (1520s)

== Buildings around the square ==
- Santissima Annunziata
- National Archeological Museum
- Ospedale degli Innocenti
- Palazzo delle Due Fontane
- Palazzo Budini Gattai
- Loggia dei Servi di Maria
