= Palazzo Budini Gattai =

Coordinates: 43°46′34.31″N 11°15′36.85″E

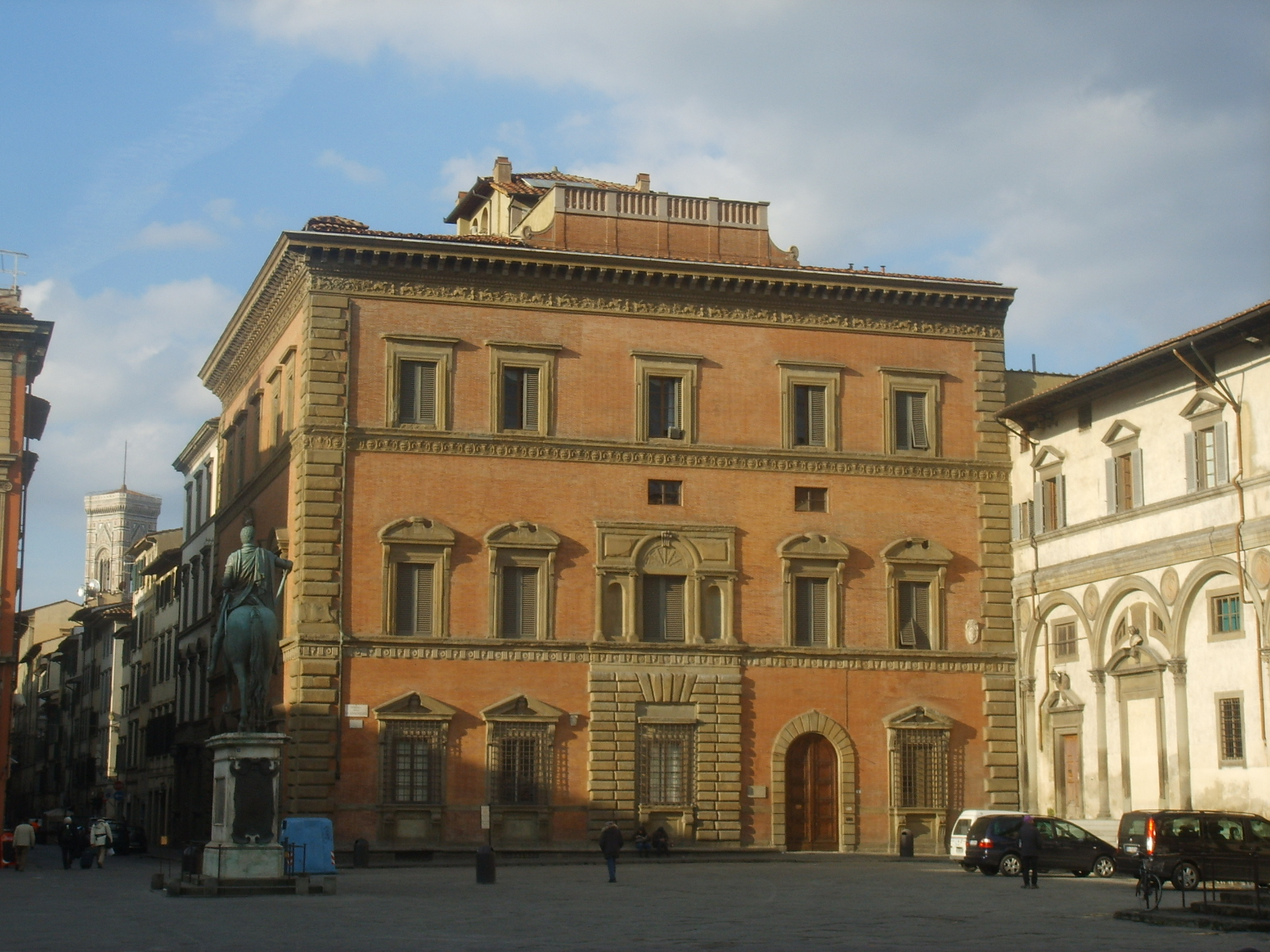
Palazzo Budini Gattai

Palazzo Budini Gattai is a palace in Piazza della Santissima Annunziata, Florence, Italy.
