= Equestrian Monument of Cosimo I =

Statue in Florence, Italy

Coordinates: 43°46′11″N 11°15′22″E

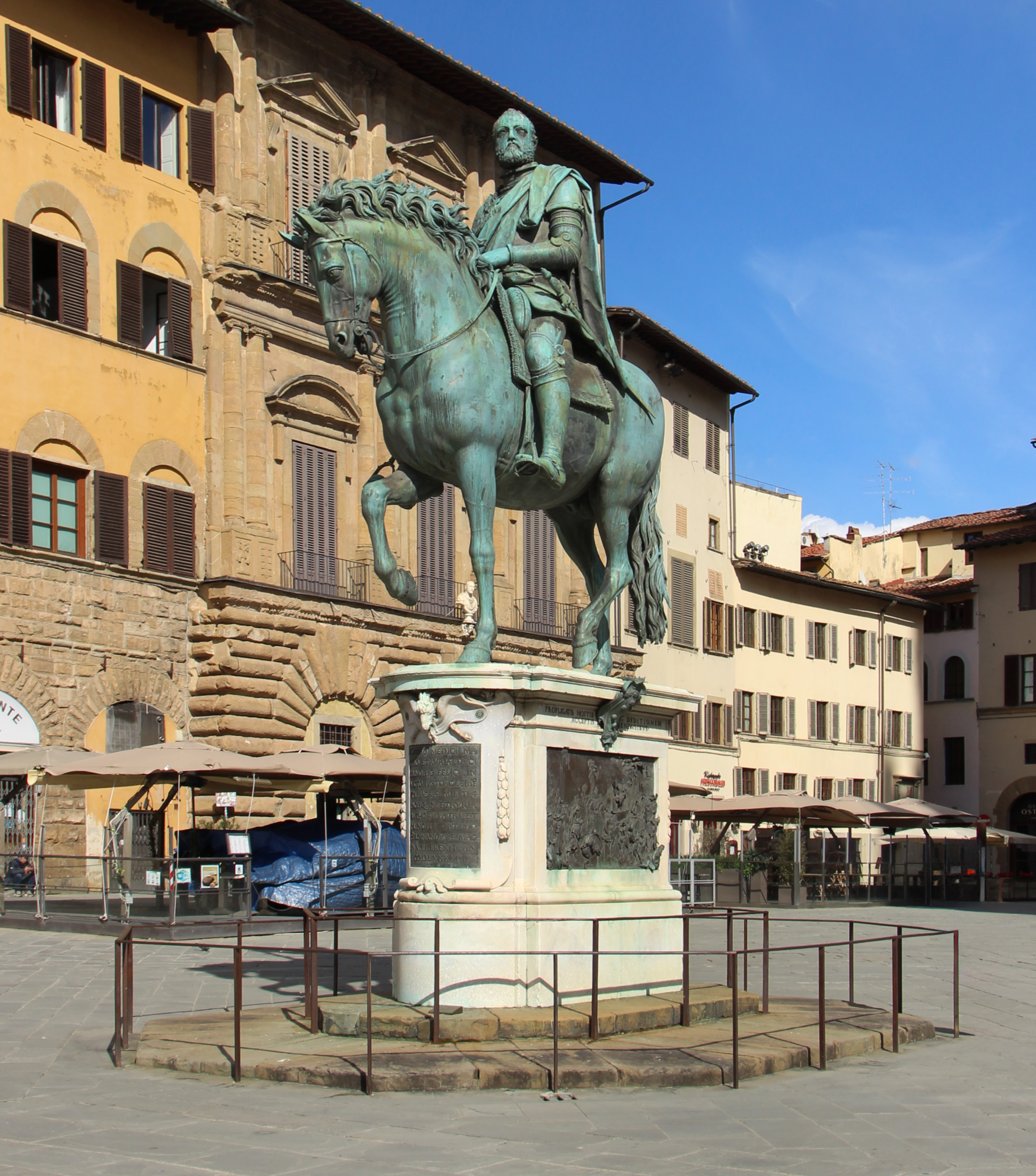
Monument of Cosimo I (1594) by Giambologna

The Equestrian Monument of Cosimo I is a bronze equestrian statue executed by Giambologna from 1587 to 1594, and erected in 1594 in the Piazza della Signoria in Florence, Tuscany, Italy.

== History ==
This statue follows the Classical Roman tradition of equestrian statues as the monument to a ruler's power, evident from the Statue of Marcus Aurelius in ancient Rome and the Regisole in Pavia, and continued in the Renaissance by examples such as Donatello's Gattamelata (1453) in Padua and Verrocchio's Statue of Bartolomeo Colleoni (1488) in Venice.

This monument was commissioned by Cosimo's son Ferdinando I from the sculptor Giambologna, who also completed the Rape of the Sabines in the adjacent Loggia dei Lanzi. The Cosimo statue stands in front of the north corner of the Palazzo della Signoria, the northernmost of the row of statues, adjacent to the Fountain of Neptune (1563) by Ammannati, that had been commissioned by Cosimo himself. Together this duo celebrates the land and sea ambitions of Cosimo. The base of the statue has reliefs with scenes from the life of Cosimo, including his coronation in Rome as grand duke in 1570 and his entrance into Siena as a ruler (1557) after his victory over that republic.

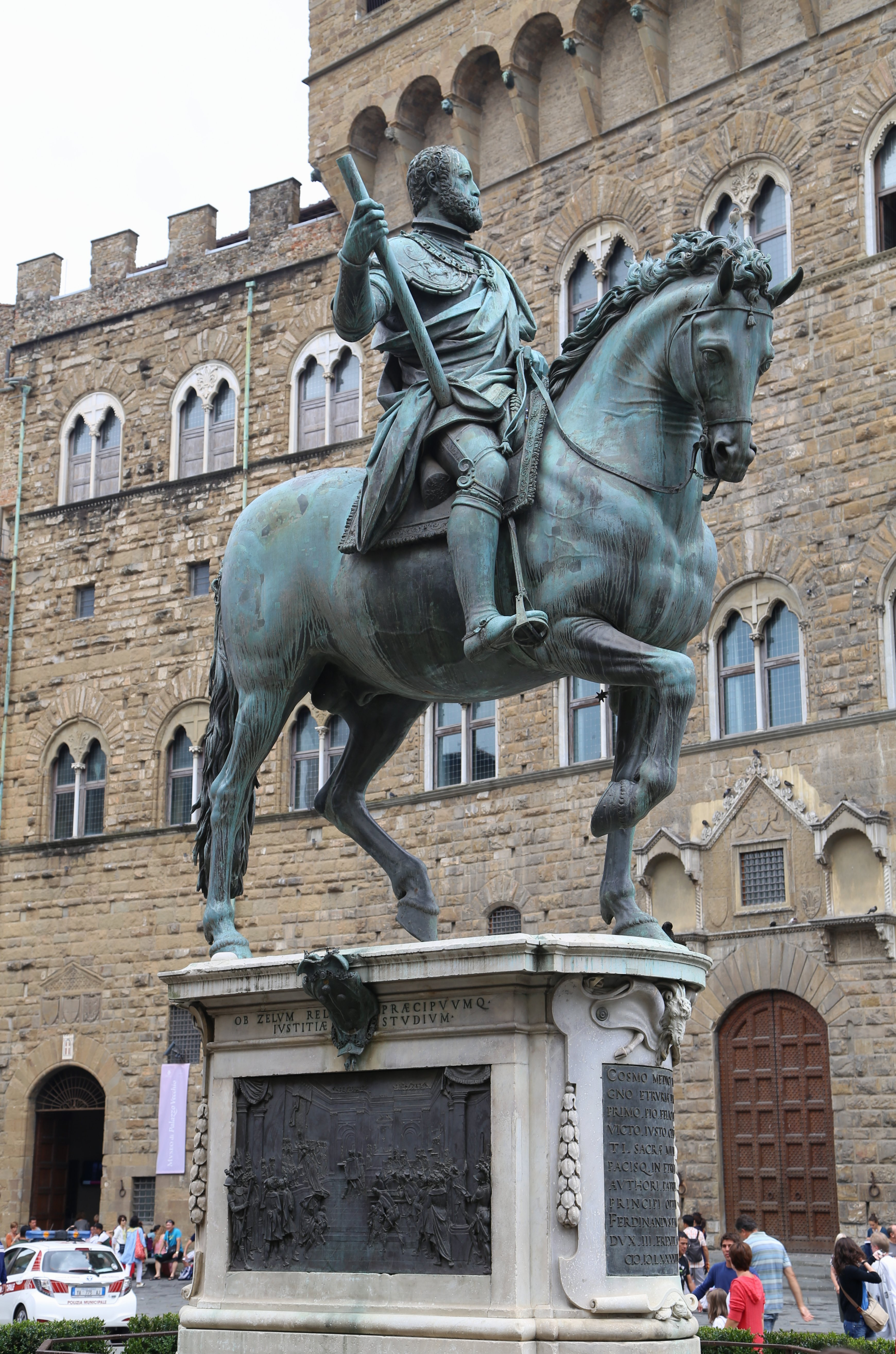
The monument seen from the north

The posture of the trotting horse in this statue is similar to those of prior statues, with right leg raised; however, unlike Marcus Aurelius, Cosimo uses stirrups and his horse shows the restraint of the bridle, albeit without much tension. Cosimo, like Gattamelata, holds a military baton, armor, and sheathed sword.

Some sources state the man and horse were cast separately, and the combined weight of the two was 23 thousand pounds. A few decades hence, Ferdinando I would have his own equestrian monument in Piazza dell'Annunziata.
