= Equestrian Monument of Ferdinando I =

Monument in Florence, Italy

Coordinates: 43°46′35″N 11°15′38″E

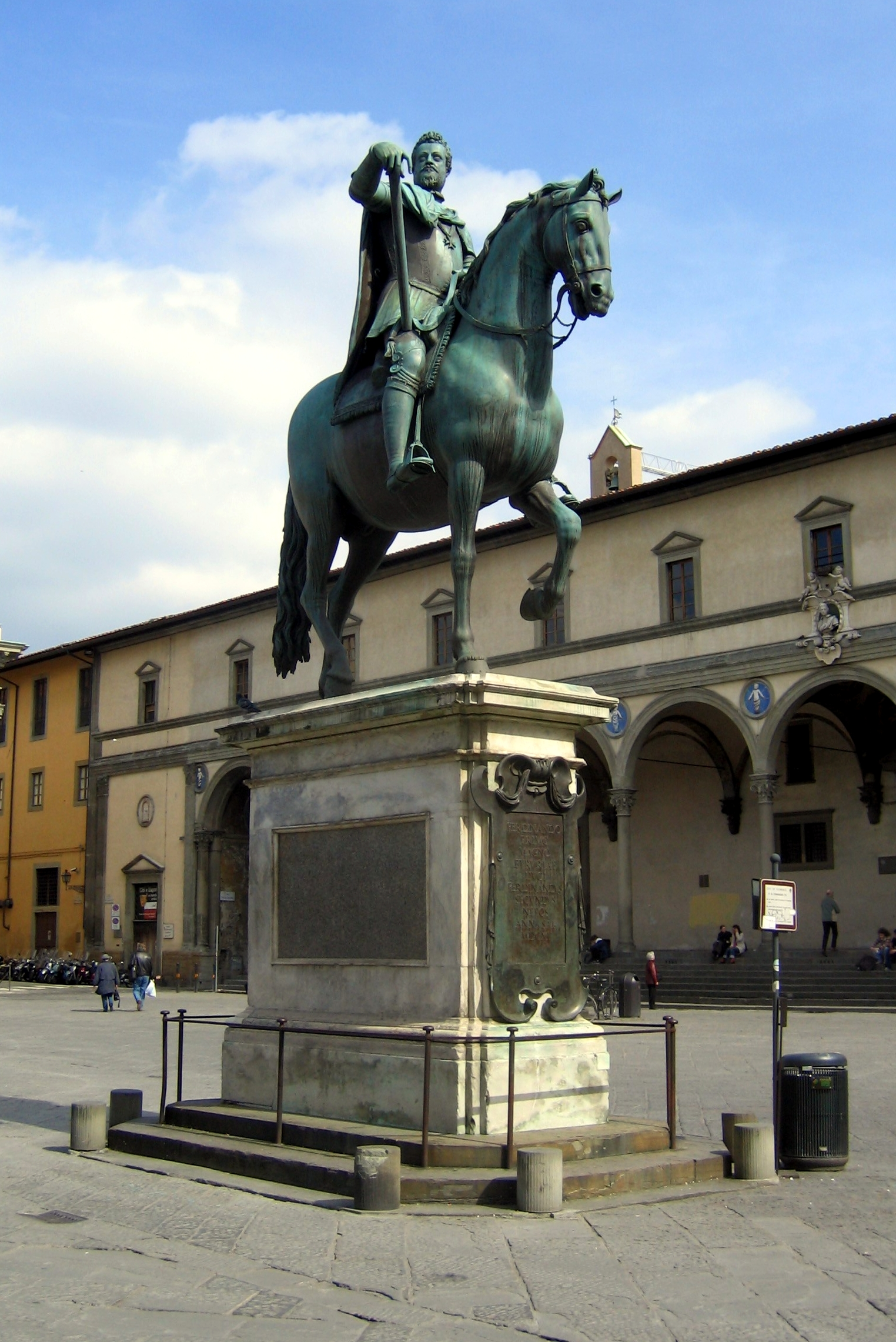
Equestrian Monument of Ferdinando I (1608) by Giambologna

The Equestrian Monument of Ferdinando I is a bronze equestrian statue by Giambologna, executed in 1602–1607, and erected in 1608 in the Piazza of the Annunziata in Florence, region of Tuscany, Italy.

== History ==
The monument was commissioned by Cosimo II, son of Ferdinando I de' Medici, Grand Duke of Tuscany, from an elder Giambologna, and was meant to be modeled on the similar Equestrian statue of Cosimo I that stands in the Piazza della Signoria.

This project was mainly completed by his pupil Pietro Tacca, and the statue was cast in 1602 and inaugurated at the site in 1608 during the festivities celebrating the marriage of Prince Cosimo II with Maria Maddalena d'Austria.

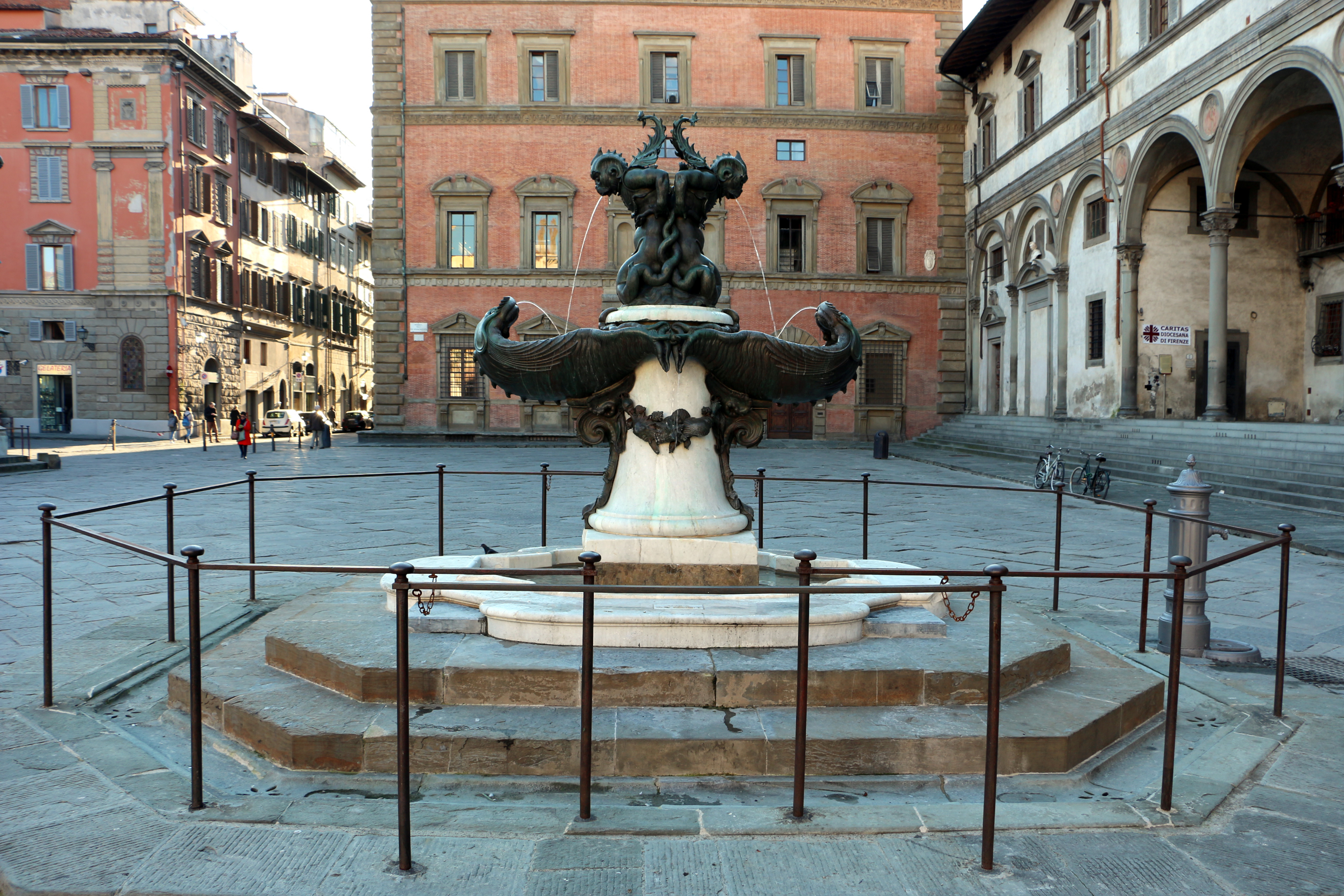
Mannerist fountain by Tacca

Grandduke Ferdinand wears armour emblazoned on the chest with the Cross of Santo Stefano, an equestrian Order established by Cosimo the elder. It is said the statue was cast with cannons taken from the Turks by the Knights of Santo Stefano.

Flanking the statue some yards to the rear of the horse are two mannerist fountains with marine gargoyles, the Fontana dei mostri marini, also created by Tacca though initially intended to be placed at the statue of Ferdinand in Livorno.
