= Piazza della Signoria =

Public square in front of the Palazzo Vecchio in Florence, Italy

- Public square
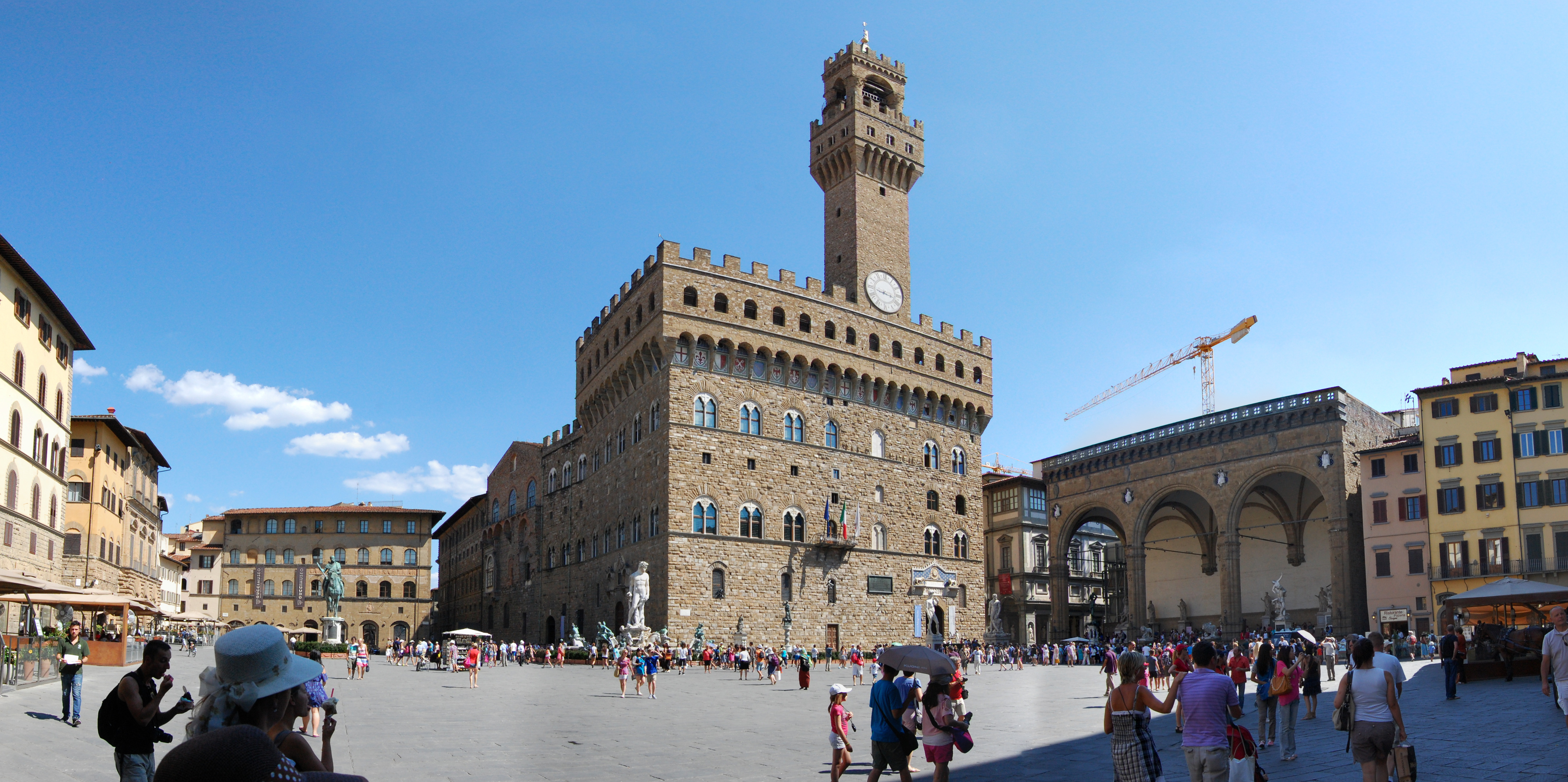
- Features: Statues Judith and Holofernes by Donatello and David by Michelangelo, Neptune Fountain
- Opened: 1330
- Surface: stone
- Location: Florence, Italy
- Location of the piazza in Florence
- Coordinates: 43°46′11″N 11°15′20″E

Piazza della Signoria (Italian: [ˈpjattsa della siɲɲoˈriːa]) is a W-shaped square in front of the Palazzo Vecchio in Florence, Central Italy. It was named after the Palazzo della Signoria, also called Palazzo Vecchio. It is the main point of the origin and history of the Florentine Republic and still maintains its reputation as the political focus of the city. It is the meeting place of Florentines as well as the numerous tourists, located near Palazzo Vecchio and Piazza del Duomo, and gateway to the Uffizi Gallery.

Designated a UNESCO World Heritage Site in 1982, Florence's Historic Centre is anchored by the iconic Piazza della Signoria, one of its most historically significant squares.

== Buildings ==
The 14th-century Palazzo Vecchio is still preeminent with its crenellated tower. The square is also shared with the Loggia della Signoria, the Uffizi Gallery, the Palace of the Tribunale della Mercanzia (1359) (now the Bureau of Agriculture), and the Palazzo Uguccioni (1550, with a facade attributed to Raphael, who however died thirty years before its construction). Located in front of the Palazzo Vecchio is the Palace of the Assicurazioni Generali (1871, built in Renaissance style).

=== Palazzo Vecchio ===
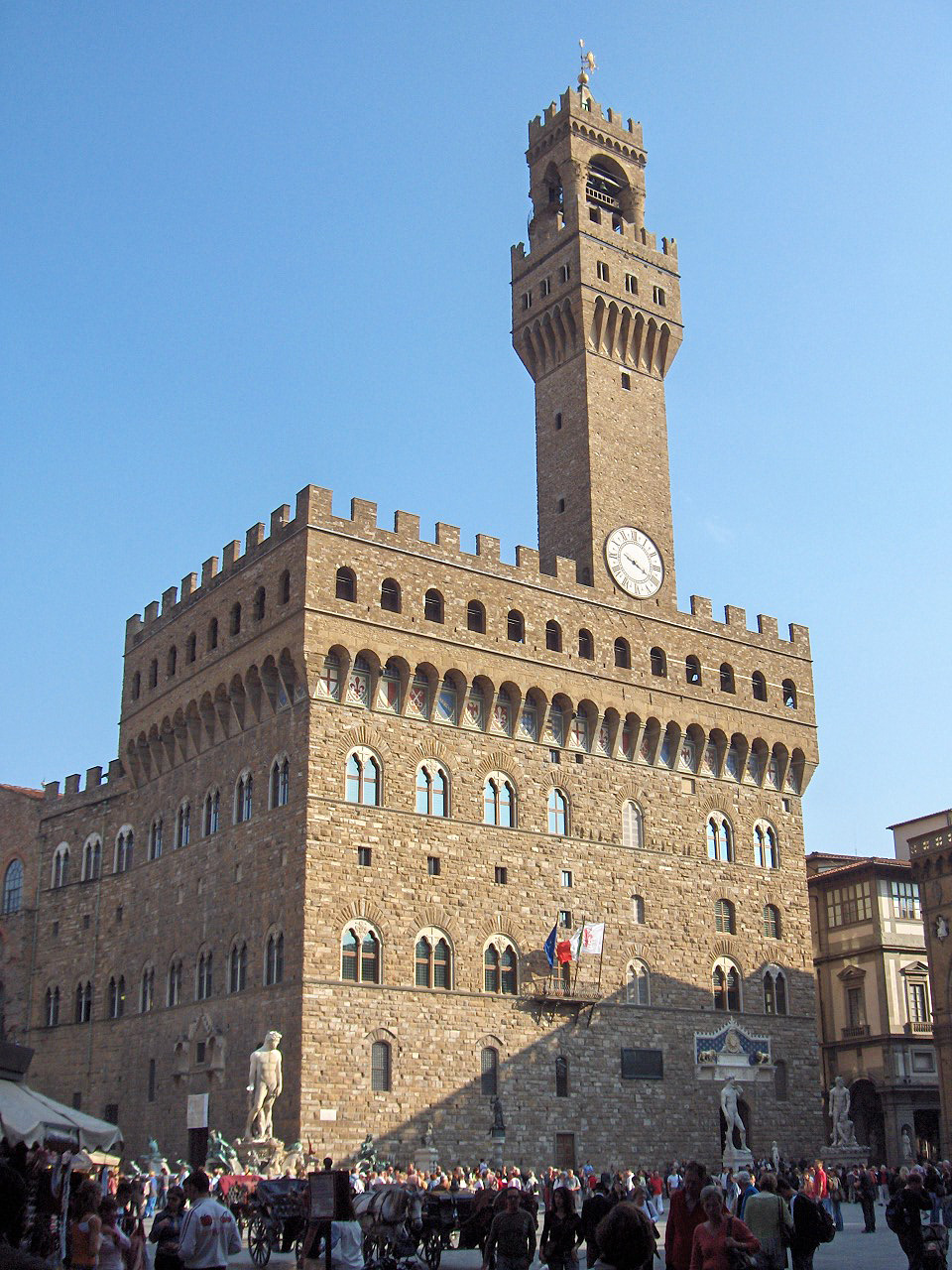
Palazzo Vecchio

The Palazzo Vecchio ("Old Palace") is the town hall of the city. This massive, Romanesque, crenellated fortress-palace is among the most impressive town halls of Tuscany. Overlooking the square with its copy of Michelangelo's David statue as well the gallery of statues in the adjacent Loggia dei Lanzi, it is one of the most significant private places in Italy, and it hosts cultural points and museums.

Originally called the Palazzo della Signoria, after the Signoria of Florence, the ruling body of the Republic of Florence, it was also given several other names: Palazzo del Popolo, Palazzo dei Priori, and Palazzo Ducale, in accordance with the varying use of the palace during its long history. The building acquired its current name when the Medici duke's residence was moved across the Arno to the Palazzo Pitti.

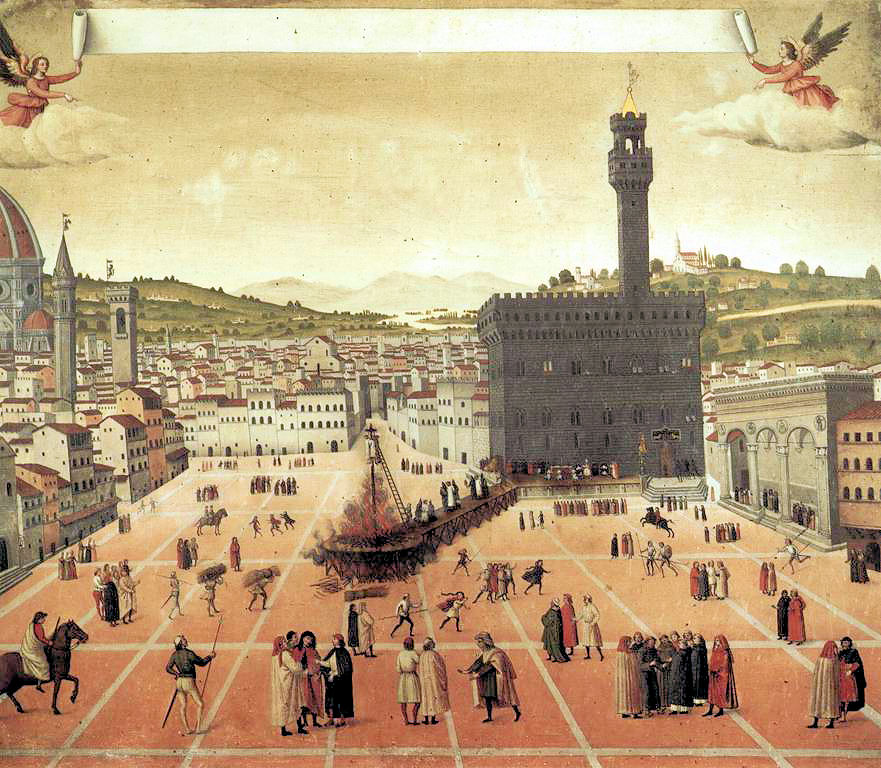
Painting of Savonarola's execution in the Piazza della Signoria

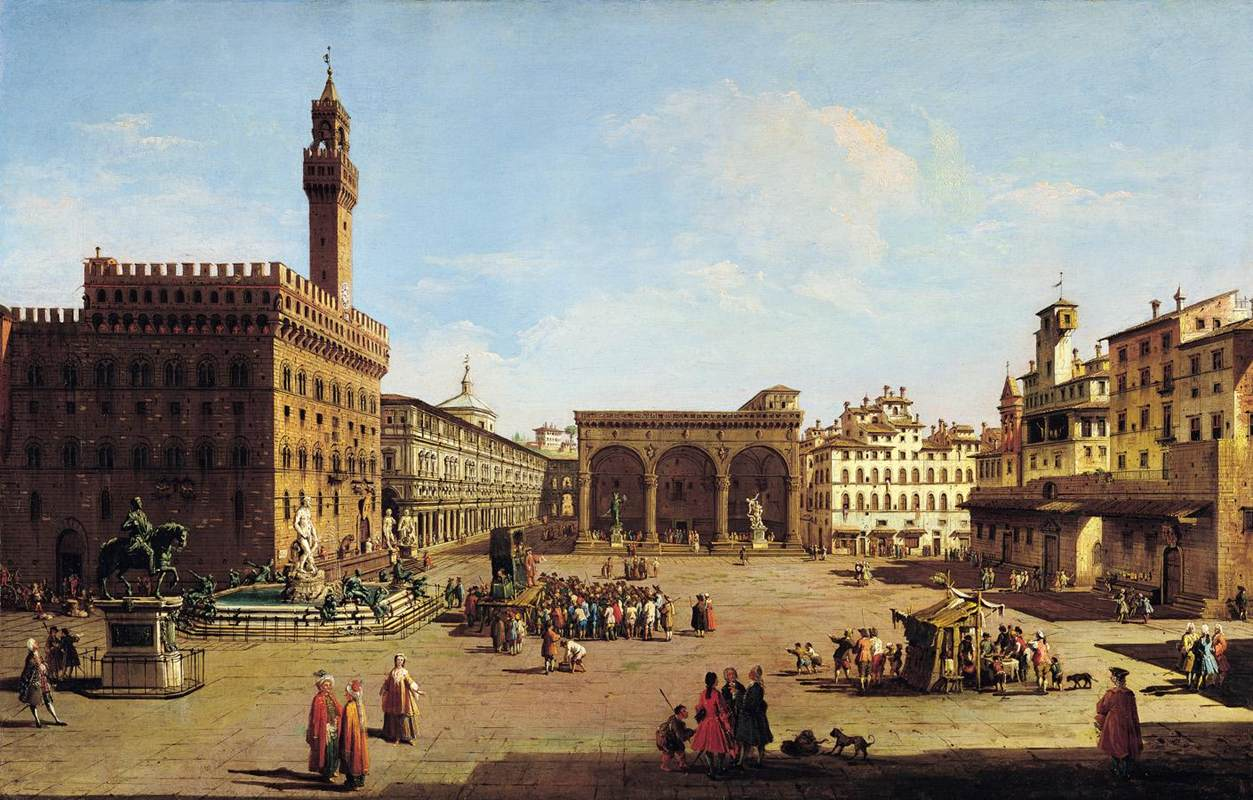
Giuseppe Zocchi, The Piazza della Signoria in Florence, first half 18th ct.

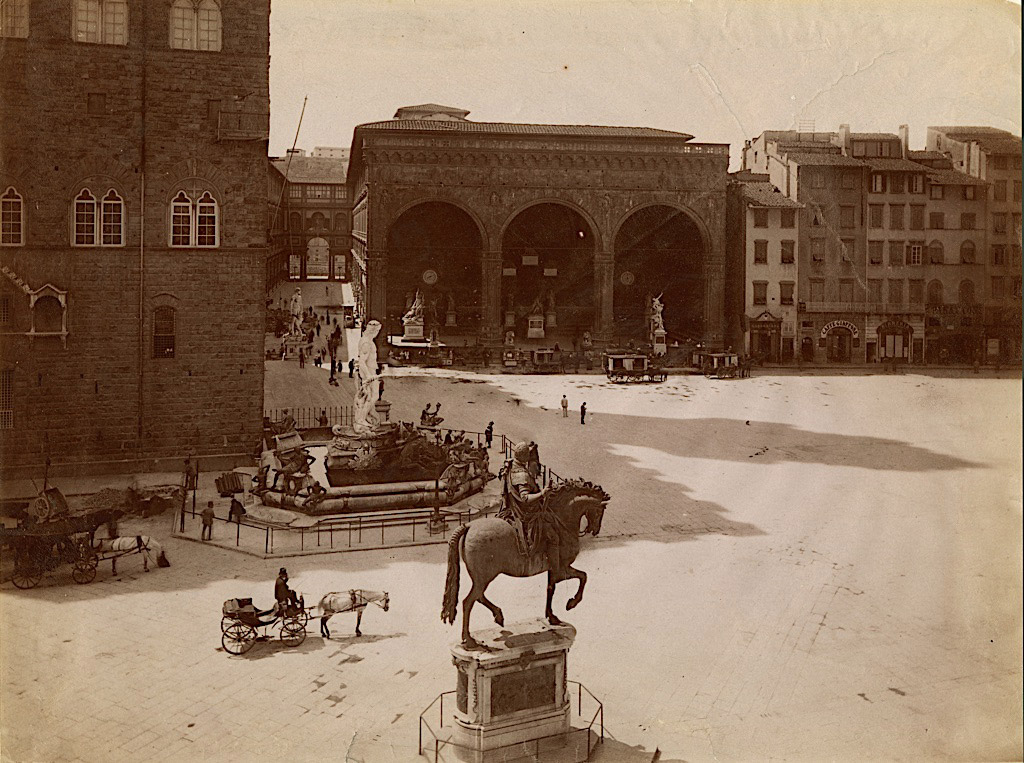
The Piazza della Signoria in c. 1873–1881, photo by Giacomo Brogi

=== Loggia dei Lanzi ===
The Loggia dei Lanzi consists of wide arches open to the street, three bays wide and one bay deep. The arches rest on clustered columns with Corinthian capitals. The wide arches appealed so much to the Florentines, that Michelangelo even proposed that they should be continued all around the Piazza della Signoria. The vivacious construction of the Loggia is in stark contrast with the severe architecture of the Palazzo Vecchio. It is effectively an open-air sculpture gallery of antique and Renaissance art including the Medici lions.

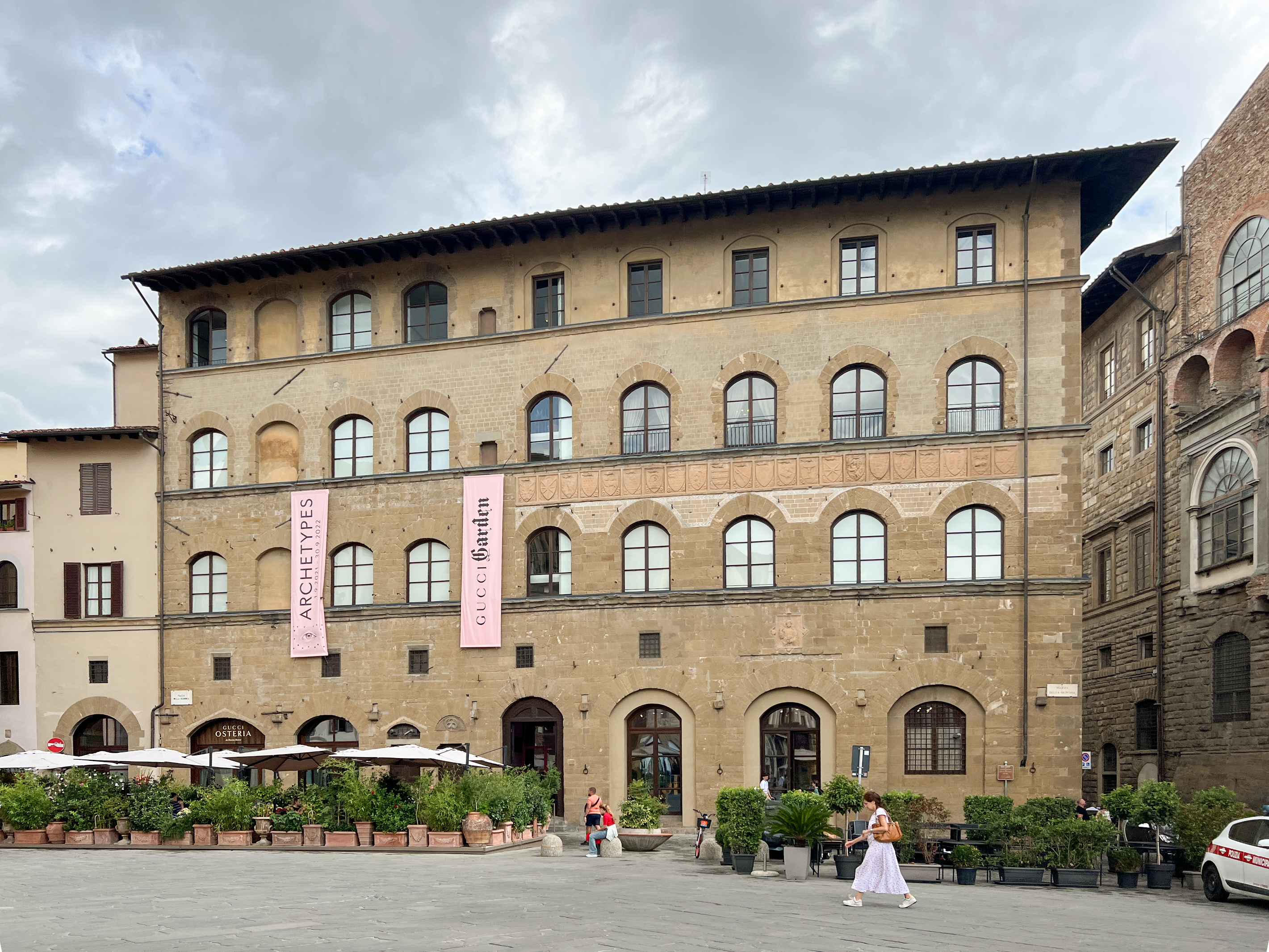
The former Palazzo del Tribunale della Mercanzia, now the Gucci Museum

=== Tribunale della Mercanzia ===
The Tribunale della Mercanzia (Tribunal of Merchandise) is a building where in the past lawyers judged in the trial between merchants. Here was a porch painted by Taddeo Gaddi, Antonio del Pollaiuolo and Sandro Botticelli, today stored in the Uffizi gallery.

=== Palazzo Uguccioni ===
Built for Giovanni Uguccioni since 1550, its design has been variously attributed to Raphael, Michelangelo, Bartolomeo Ammannati or Raffaello da Montelupo.

=== Palazzo delle Assicurazioni Generali ===
The Palazzo delle Assicurazioni Generali was designed in the Neo-Renaissance style in 1871, and is one of the very few purpose-built commercial buildings in the centre of the city. On the ground floor of this palace is the historical cafè Rivoire.

=== Other palaces ===
Other palaces are the palazzo dei Buonaguisi and the palazzo dell'Arte dei Mercatanti.

The piazza was already a central square in the original Roman town Florentia, surrounded by a theatre, Roman baths and a workshop for dyeing textiles. Added later were a church dedicated to San Romolo, a loggia and an enormous 5th-century basilica. This was shown by the archaeological treasures found beneath the square when it was repaved in the 1980s. Even remains of a Neolithic site were found. The square started taking shape from 1268 on, when houses of Ghibellines were pulled down by the victorious Guelphs. The square remained a long time untidy, full of holes. In 1385 it was paved for the first time. In 1497 Girolamo Savonarola and his followers carried out on this square the famous Bonfire of the Vanities, burning in a large pile books, gaming tables, fine dresses, and works of poets. In front of the Fountain of Neptune, a round marble plaque marks the exact spot where Savonarola was hanged and burned on May 23, 1498.

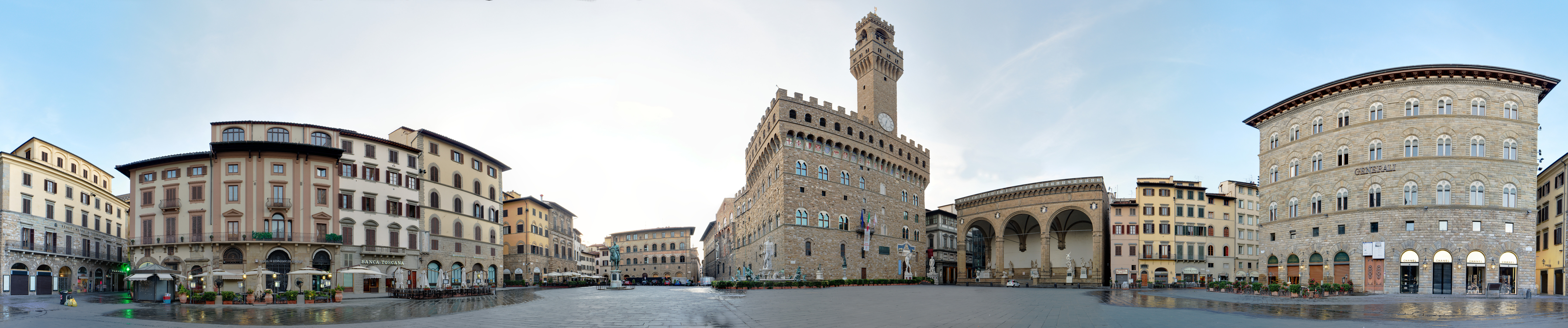
Panorama of the piazza

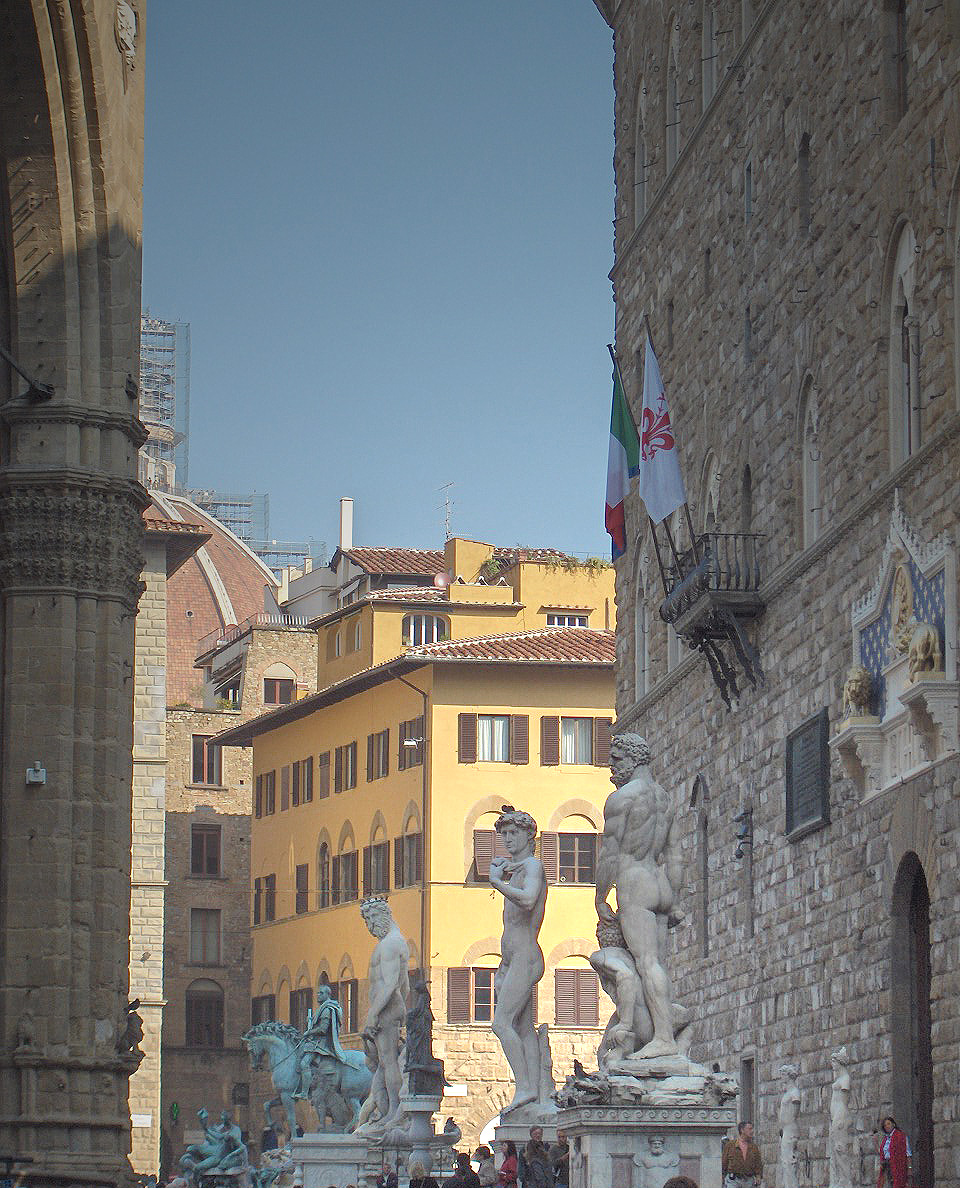
The statues in front of the Palazzo Vecchio

== Statues ==
Various imposing statues ring this square including:

1. Equestrian Monument of Cosimo I, honoring Cosimo I de' Medici and sculpted by Giambologna (1594)
2. Fountain of Neptune by Bartolomeo Ammannati (1575)
3. Il Marzocco, ("the lion")
4. Judith and Holofernes, by Donatello .
5. Copy of Michelangelo's David, over 5 meters high, at the entrance of the Palazzo Vecchio; the original by Michelangelo is housed in the Galleria dell'Accademia.
6. Hercules and Cacus by Bandinelli (1533), to the right of the Palazzo's entrance

Loggia dei Lanzi

1. Perseus with the Head of Medusa by Cellini (1554)
2. The Abduction of the Sabine Women by Giambologna (1583)
3. Medici lions, one of which was a 2nd-century Roman lion in relief the otherwise little known Giovanni di Scherano Fancelli carved free and reworked. The pendant was made by Flaminio Vacca (since 1598)

== Gallery ==
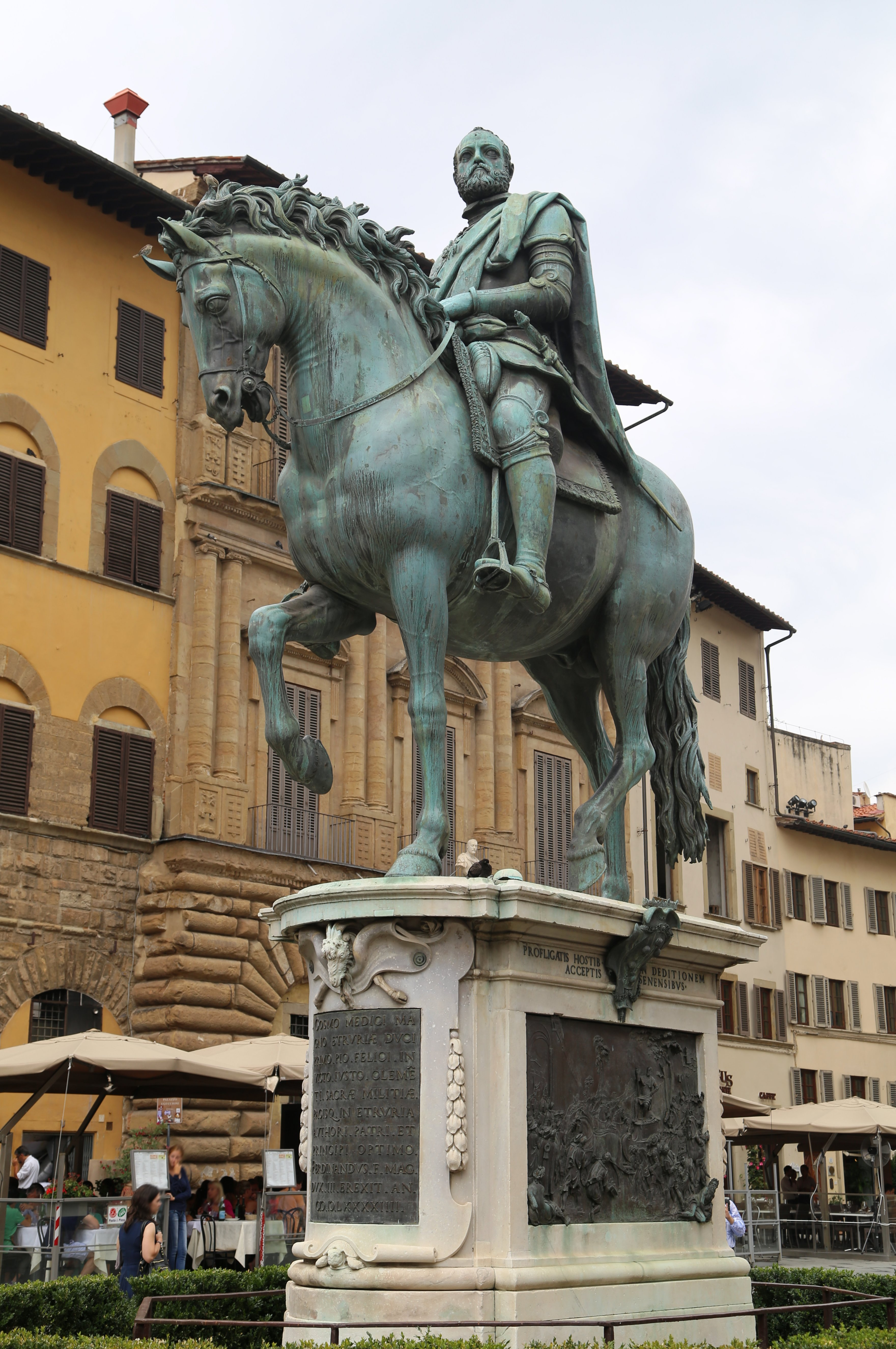
Equestrian Monument of Cosimo I by Giambologna (1594), honoring Cosimo I de' Medici

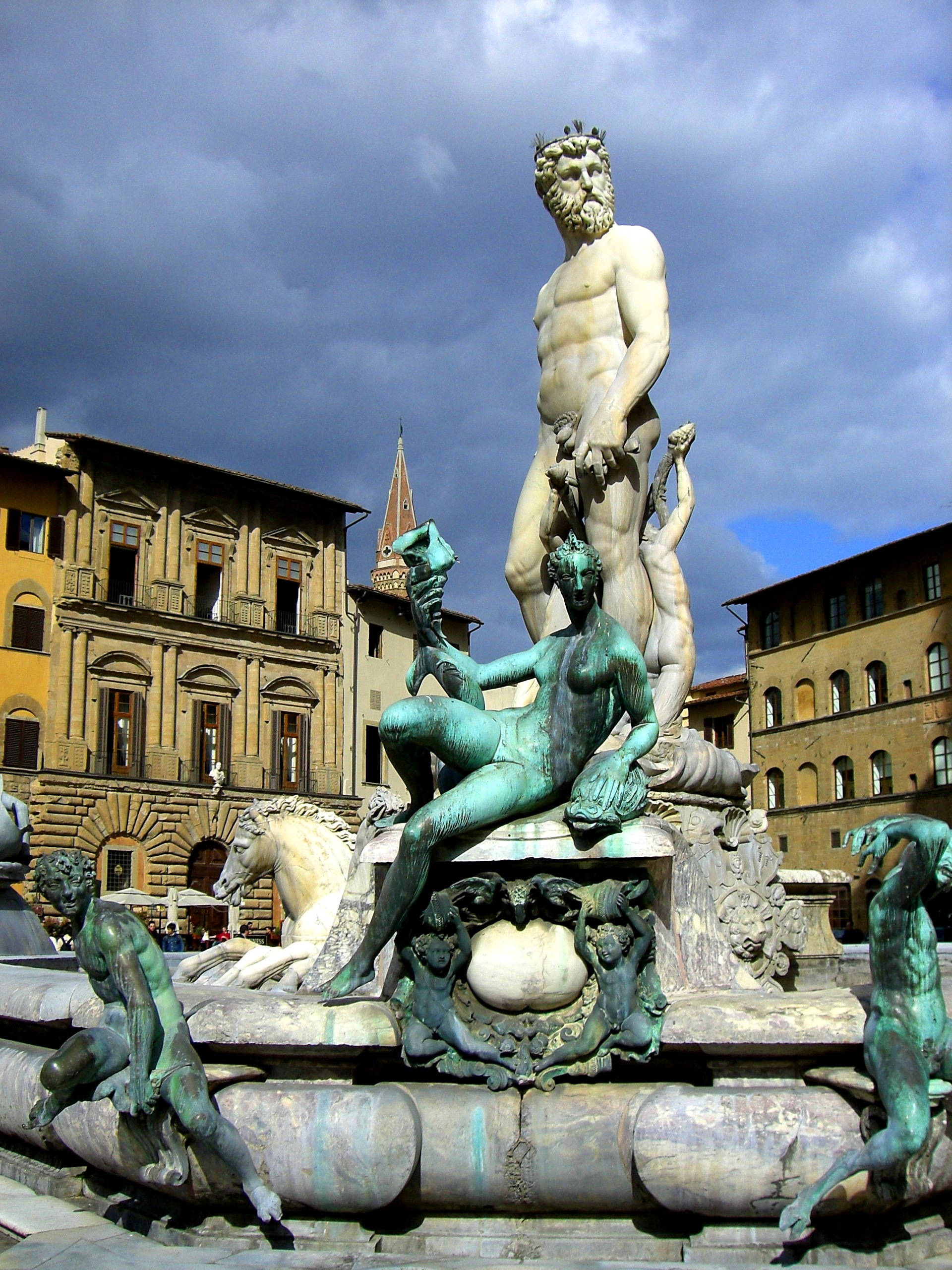
Fountain of Neptune by Bartolomeo Ammannati (1575)

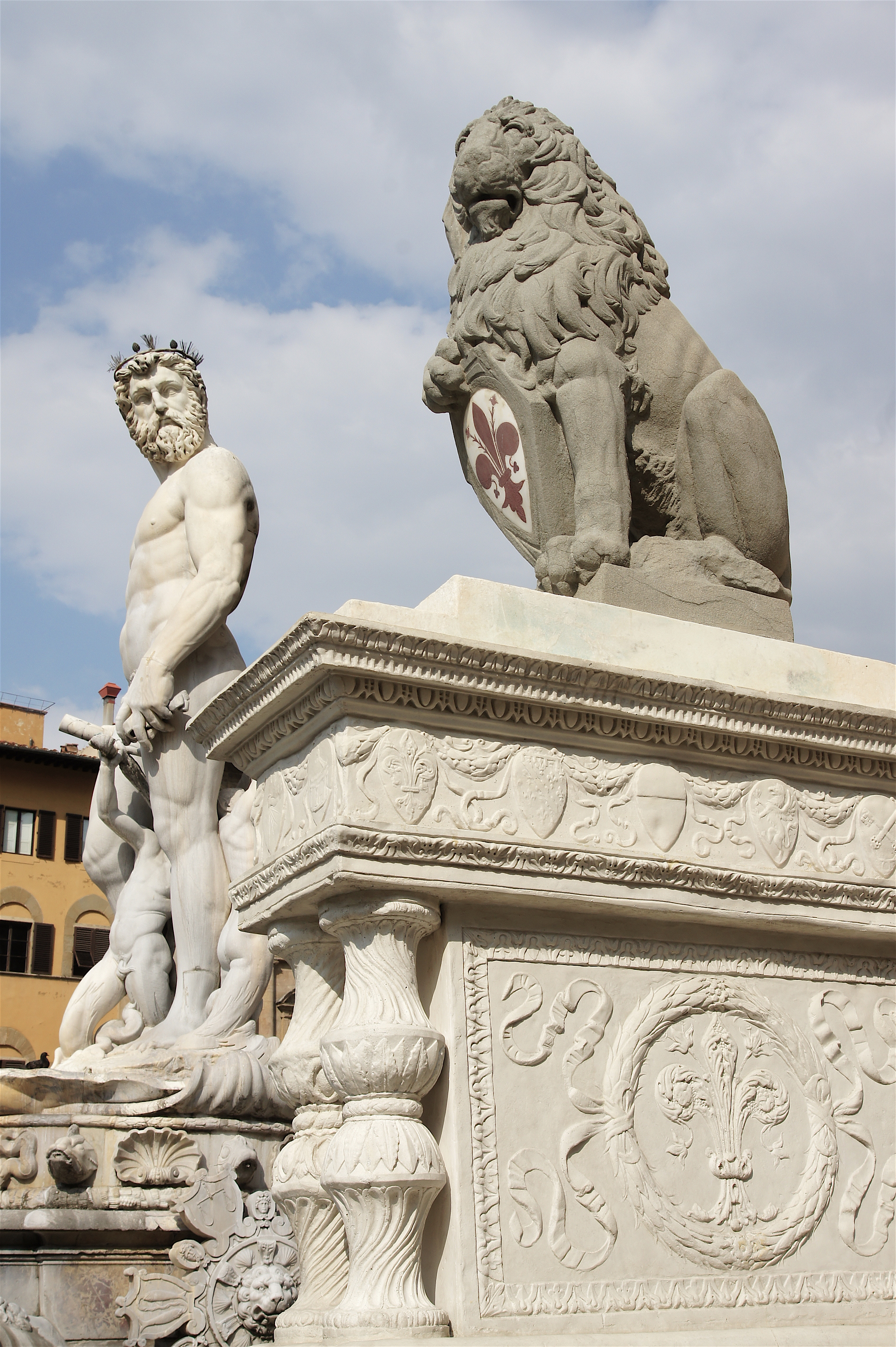
Neptune and the copy of Donatello's Marzocco, presenting the Florentine Lily (copy, original in the Bargello)

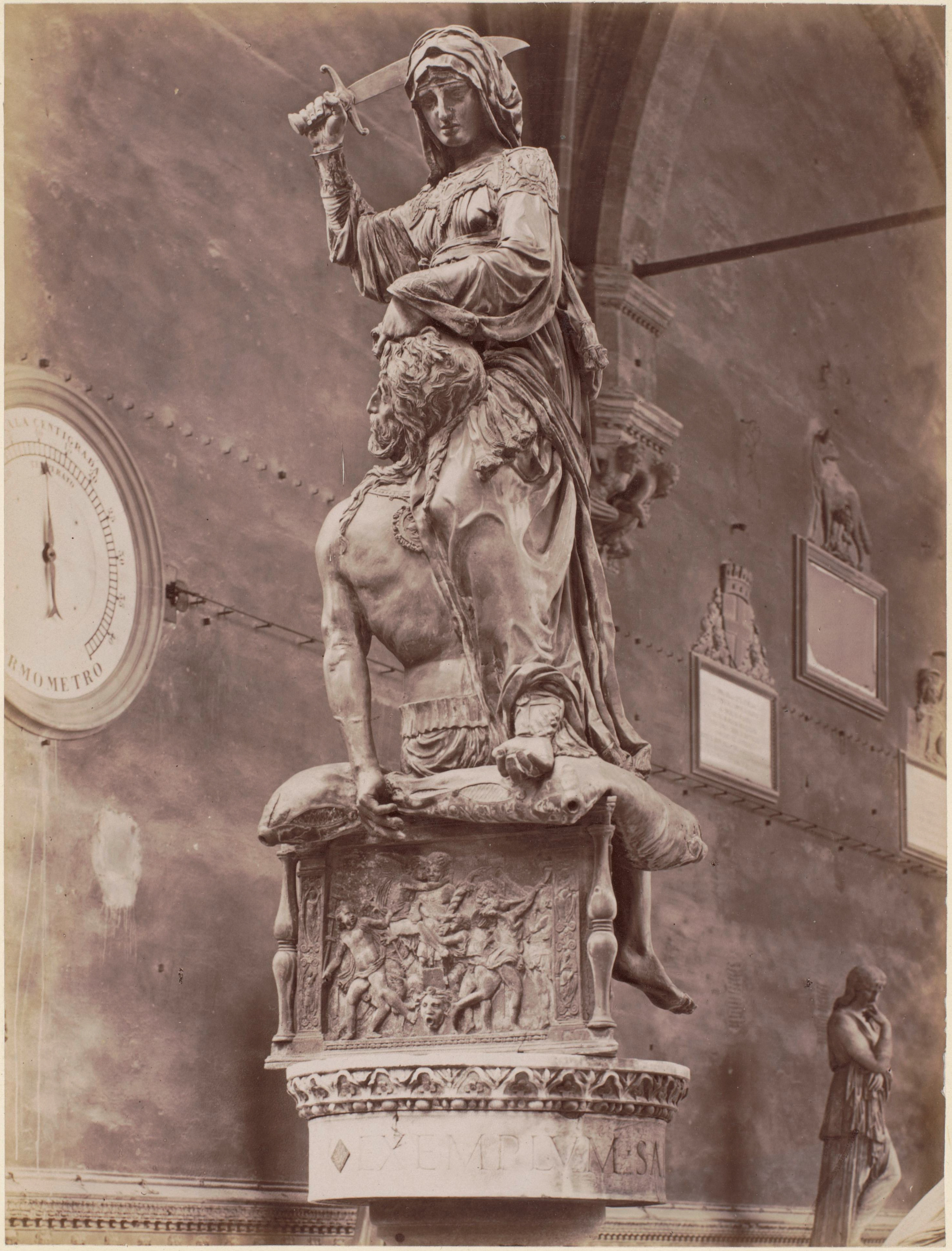
Donatello's original bronze group Judith and Holofernes, (c. 1440) still in the Loggia dei Lanzi at the end of the 19th ct. (photo: anonyme). (copy, original at Palazzo Vecchio)

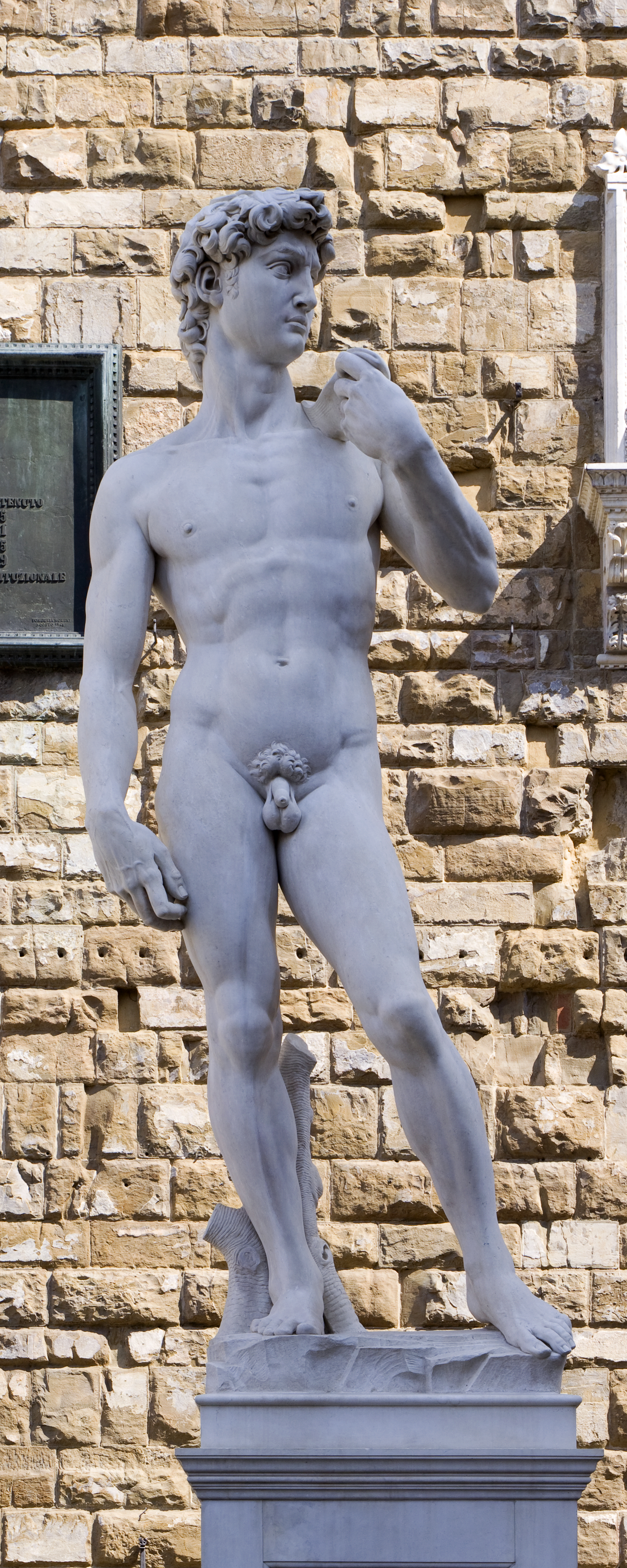
A reproduction of Michelangelo's David; the original (1501–1504) is housed in the Galleria dell'Accademia.

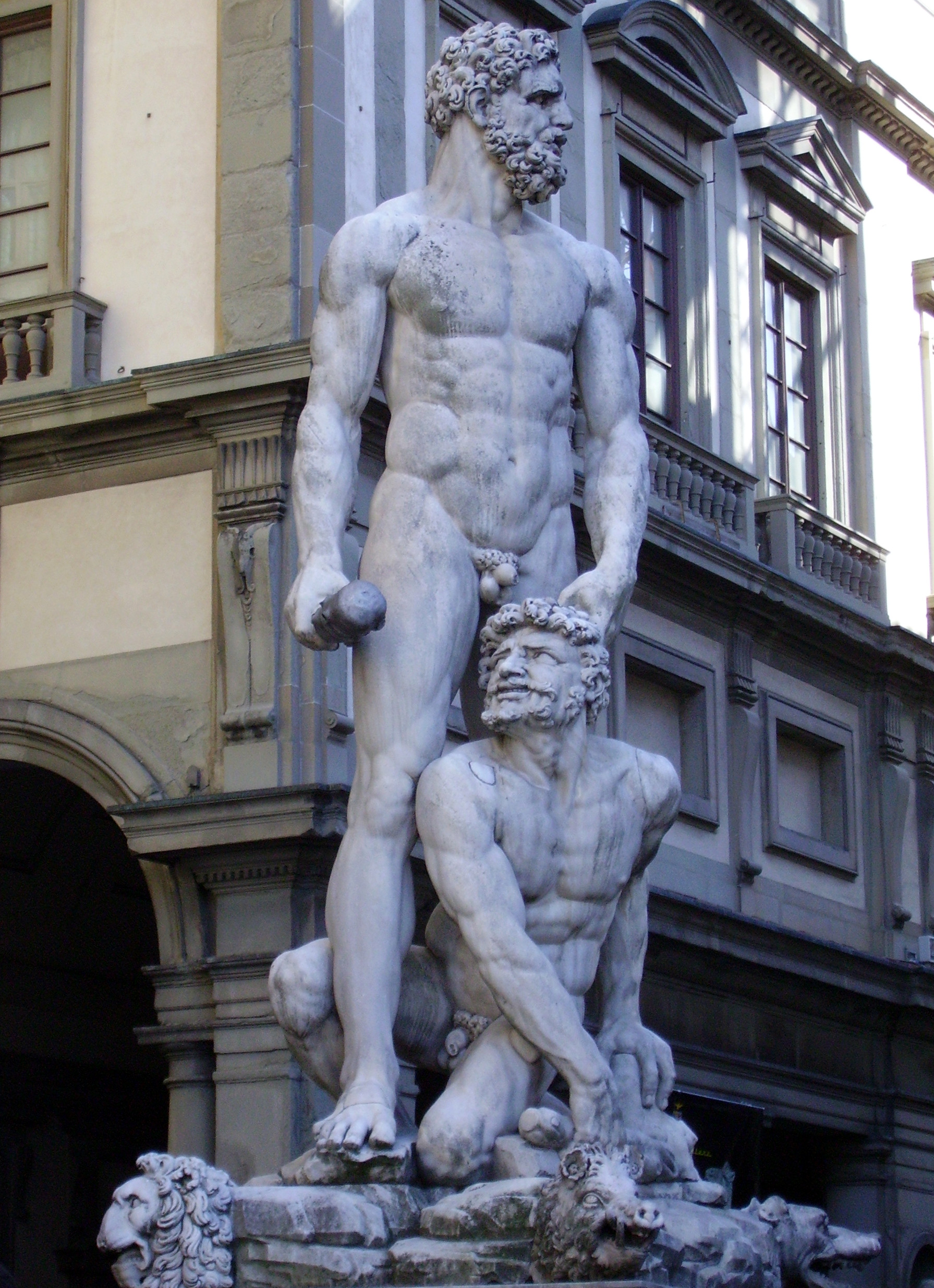
Bartolommeo Bandinelli's Hercules and Cacus (1533)

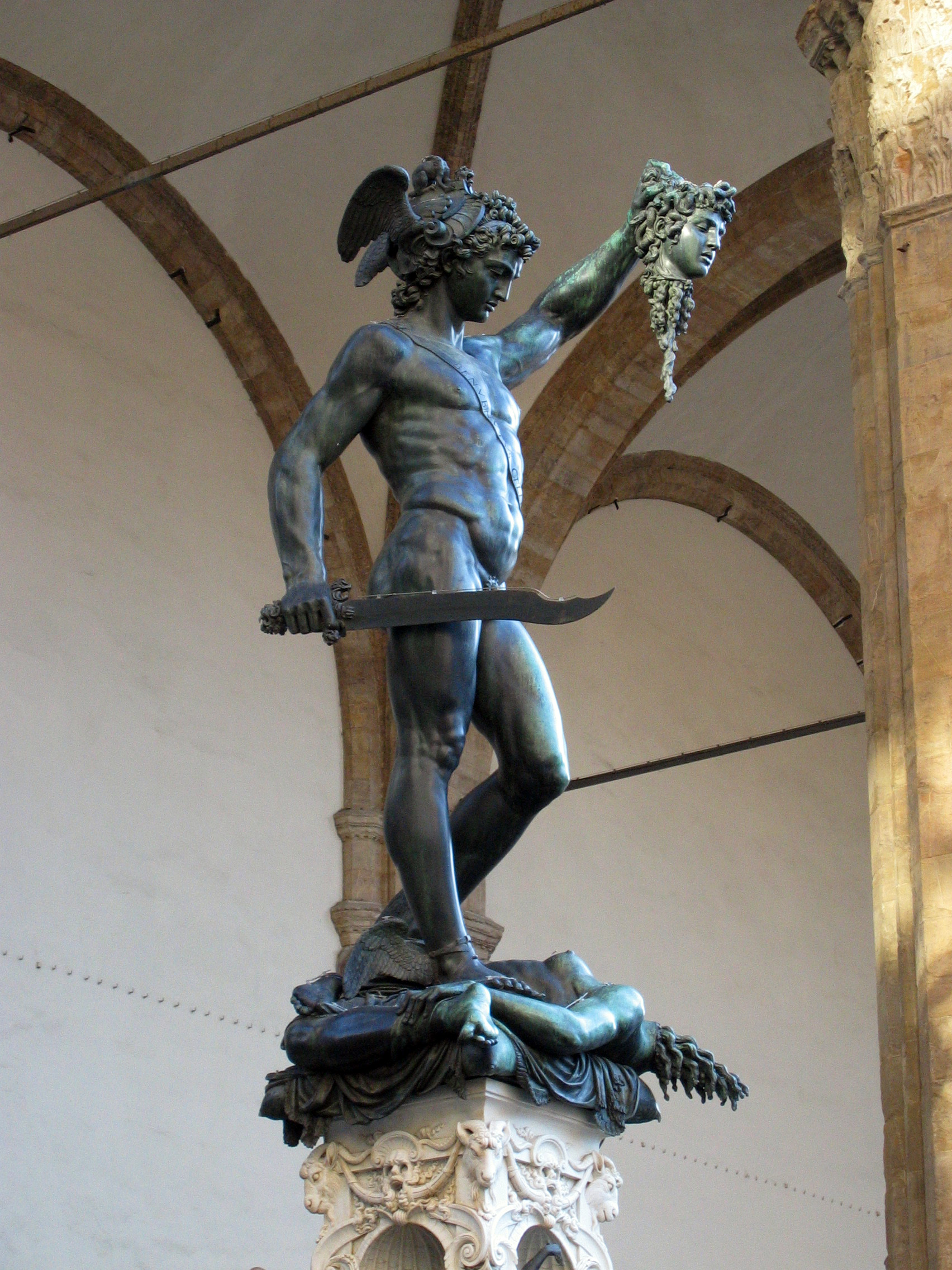
Benvenuto Cellini's statue Perseus with the Head of Medusa (1554)

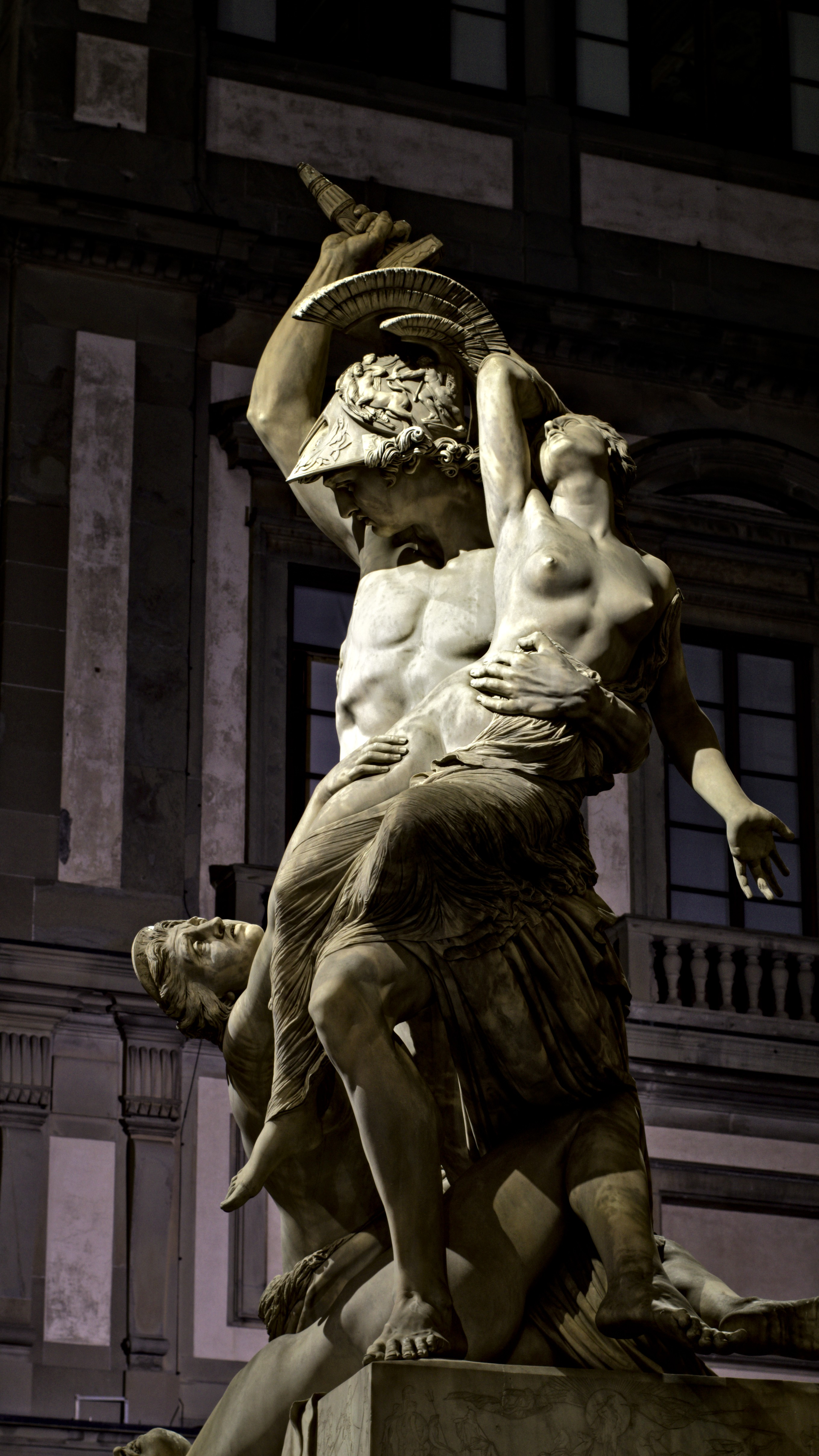
Pio Fedi's The Rape of Polyxena

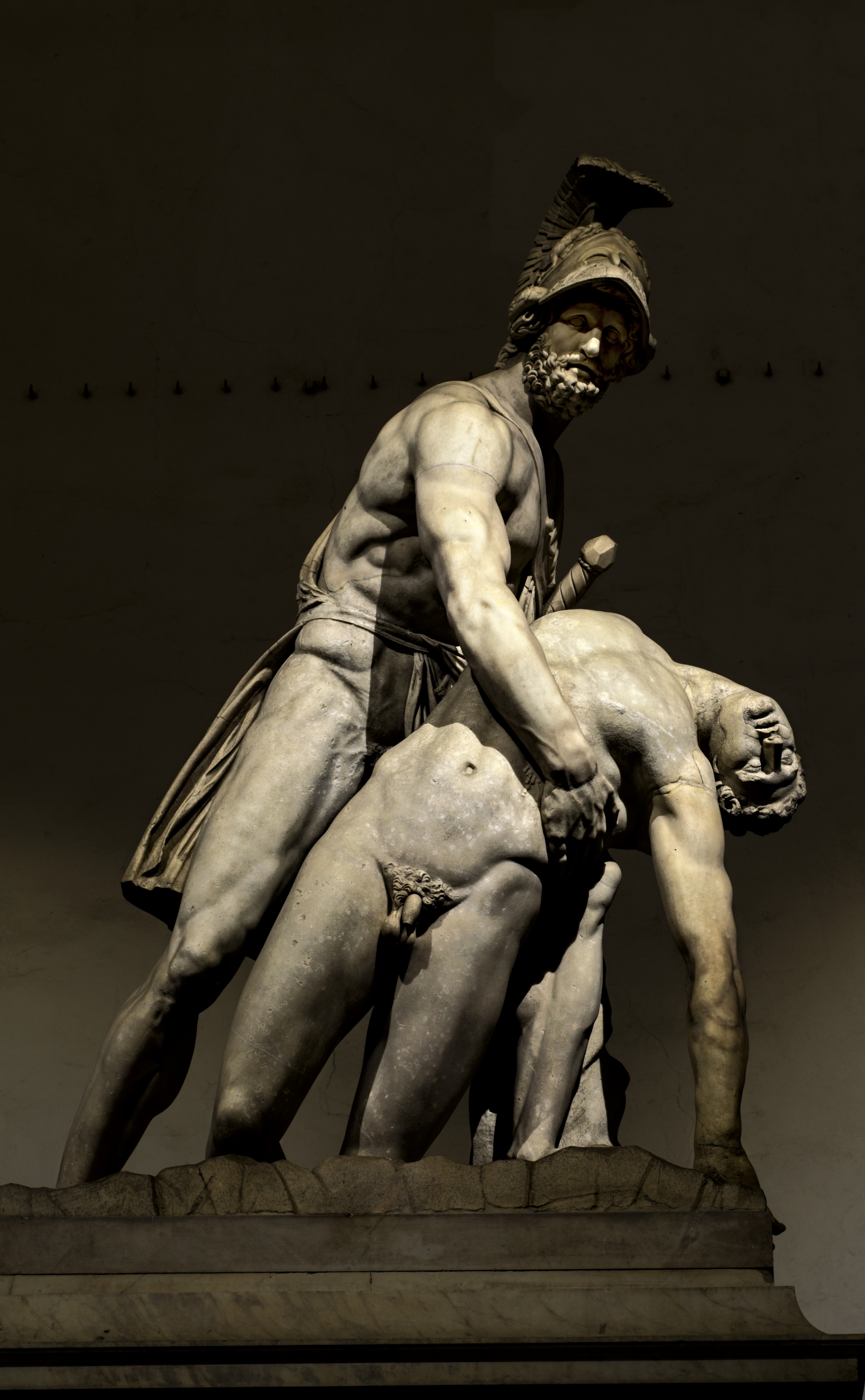
The Pasquino Group

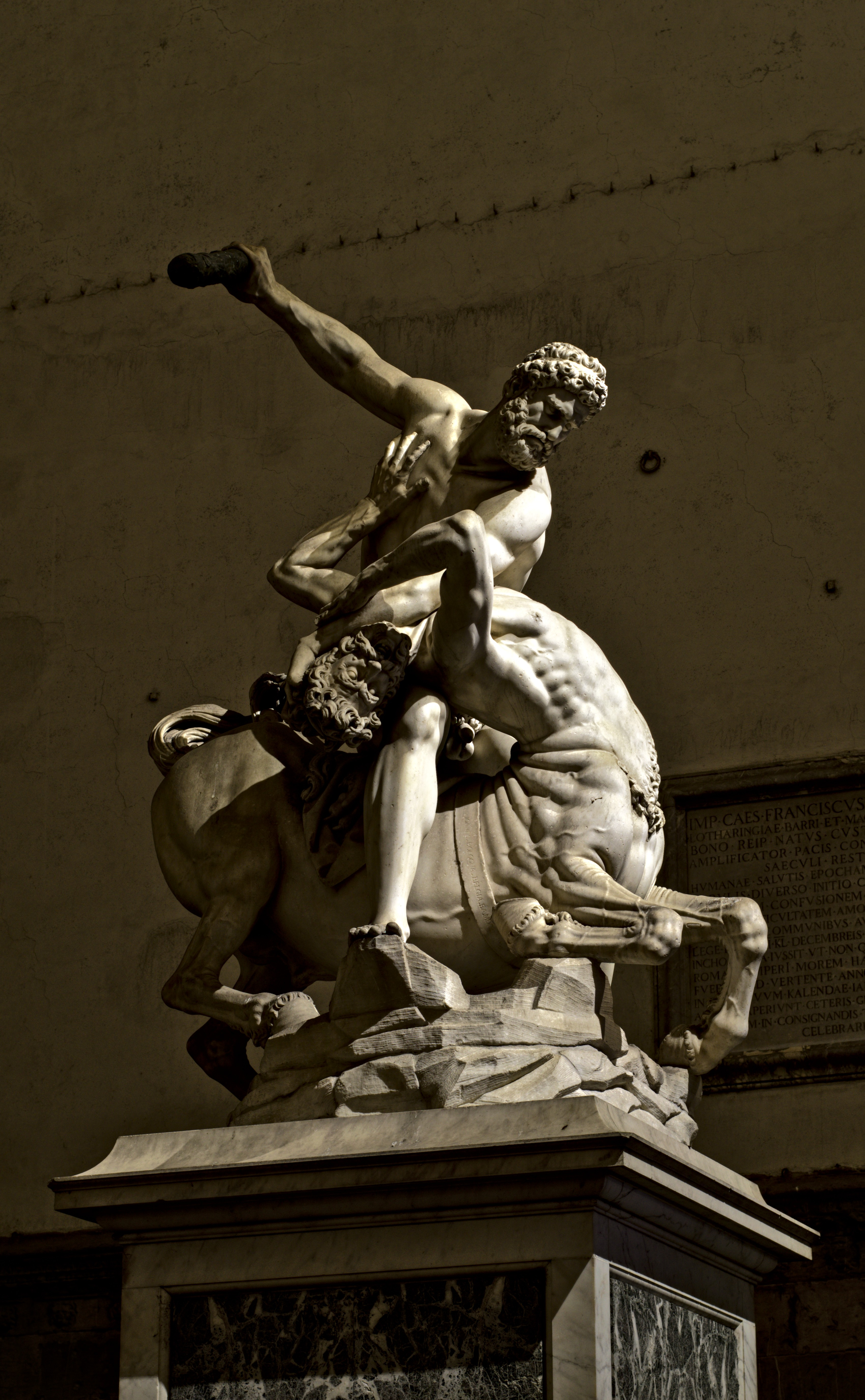
Giambologna's Heracles and Nessus

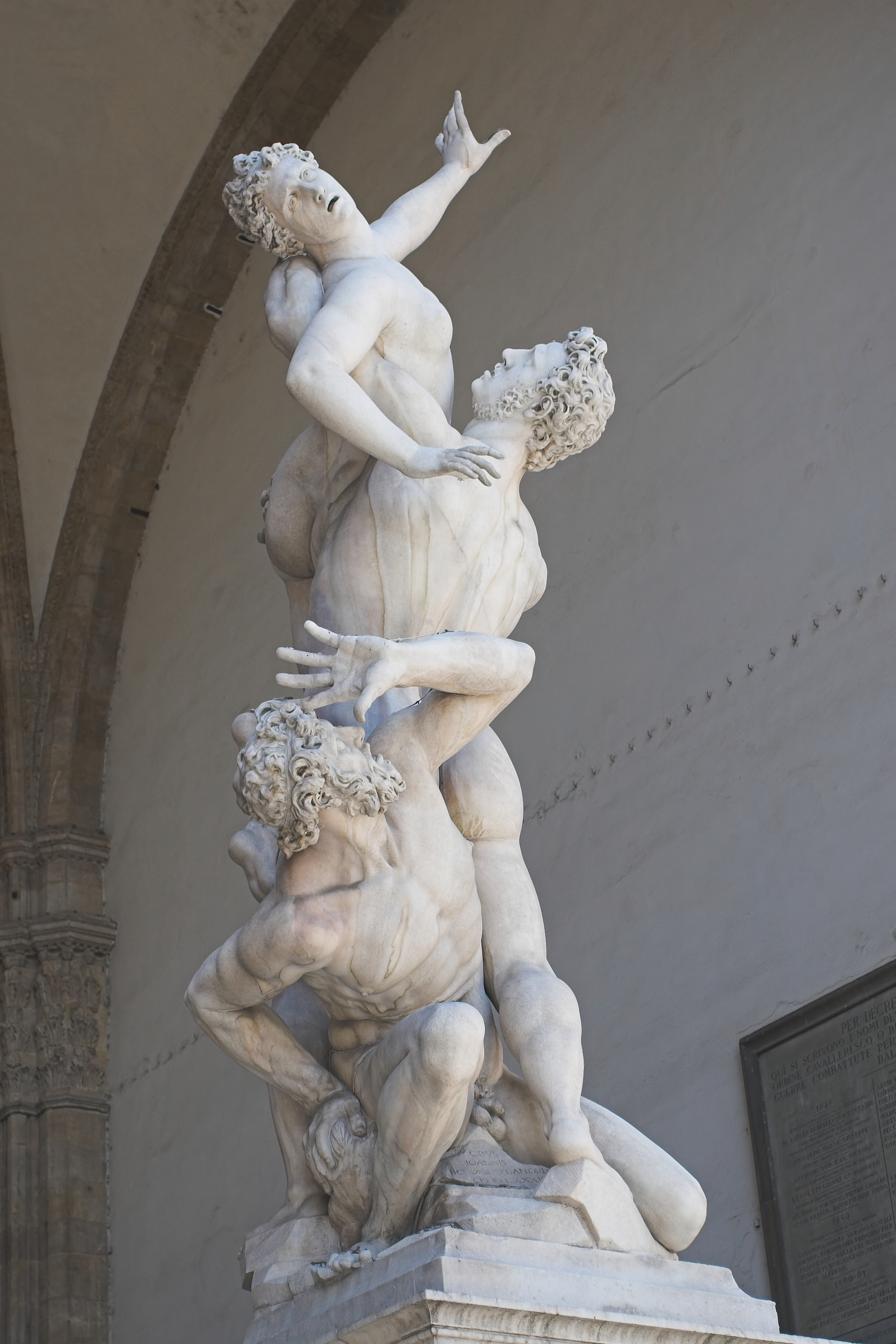
Giambologna's Abduction of a Sabine Woman (1583)

== Restrictions ==
There are several restrictions on car movements in the city with various areas designated as zona a traffico limitato (ZTL), which translates to "restricted traffic zone." Areas such as the Piazza della Signoria, as well as those of Piazza del Duomo, Via Tornabuoni, and Piazza Pitti, are entirely reserved for pedestrian use. An exception is made for fire trucks, ambulances, and local taxis. In March 2023, an American tourist drove his red, Swiss-registered Ferrari in Piazza della Signoria and received a fine of $500.
