= Palazzo Uguccioni =

Palace in Florence, Italy

Coordinates: 43°46′11.96″N 11°15′23.36″E

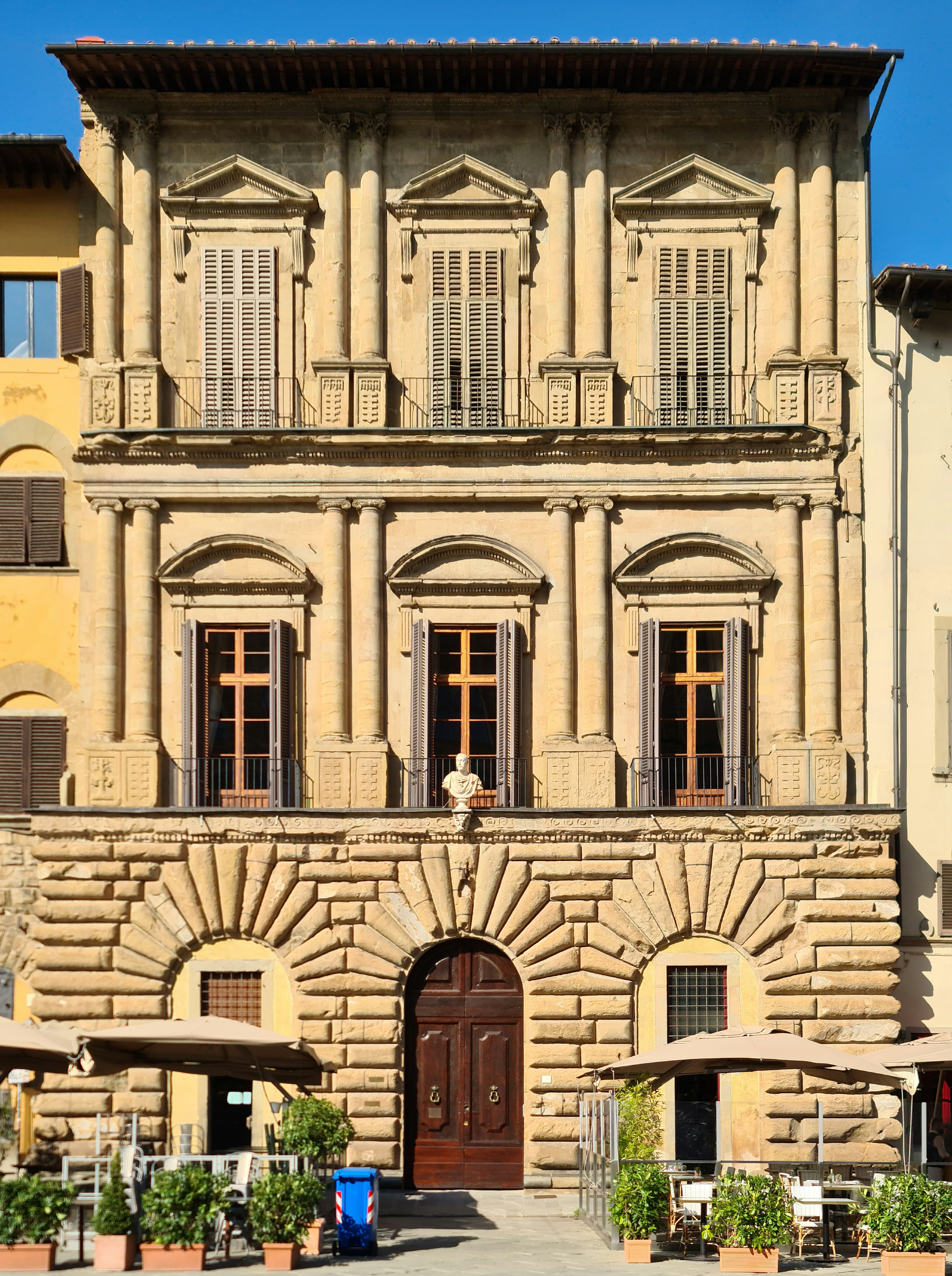
Palazzo Uguccioni.

Palazzo Uguccioni is a Renaissance palace on the Piazza della Signoria in Florence, central Italy.

The palace was built, for Giovanni Uguccioni starting from 1550. Its design has been variously attributed to Raphael, Michelangelo, Andrea Palladio, Bartolomeo Ammannati or Raffaello da Montelupo, although no proofs exists if not that its drawing came from Rome in 1549 and that its style was reminiscent of Raphael's or Bramante's, which were a novelty in Florence at the time. It is the only building in Florence with columns on its façade.

The lower floors has three arcades with rustication in pietraforte, the material used for the whole façade. The upper floors have two orders of Ionic (first floor) and Corithian (second floor) columns. The latter's pedestals have sculpted coat of arms of the family. Above the entrance is a bust of Francesco I de' Medici, perhaps executed by Giambologna.
