= Hercules and Cacus =

Sculpture by Baccio Bandinelli

Coordinates: 43°46′09″N 11°15′21″E

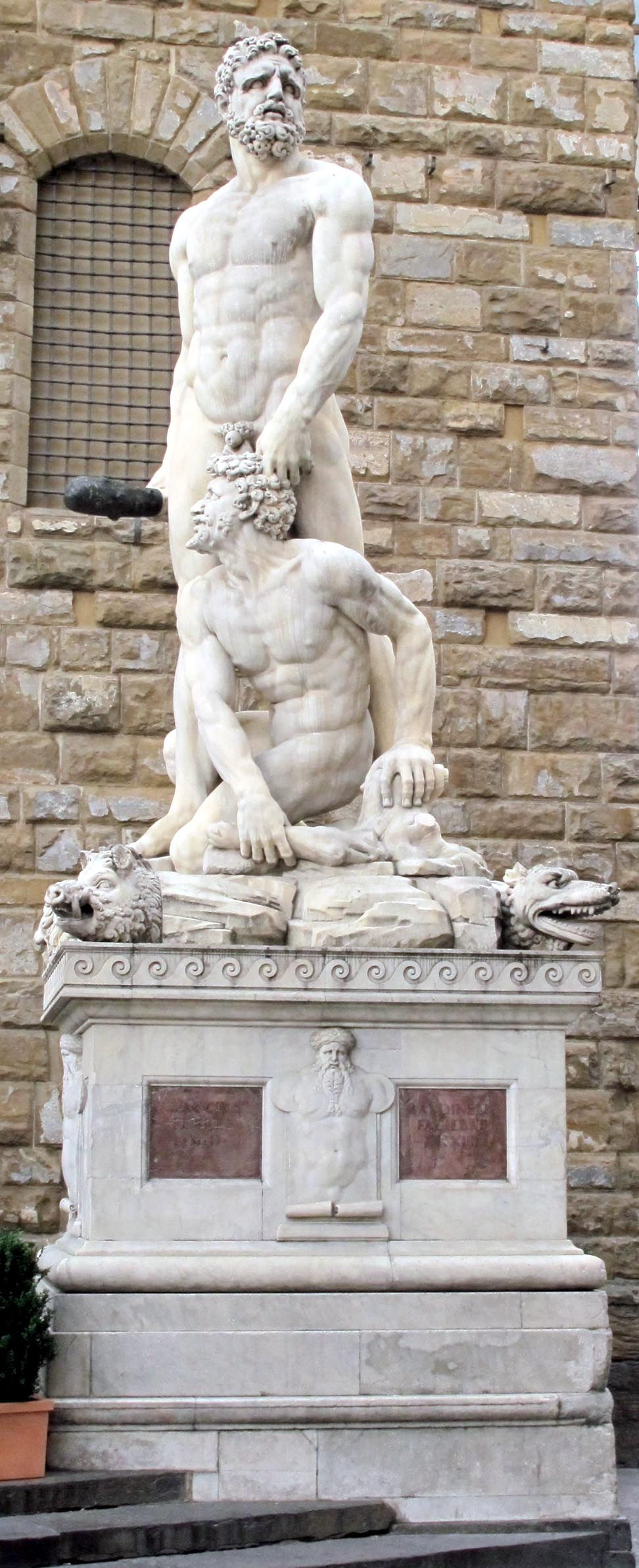
Hercules and Cacus by Baccio Bandinelli, Piazza della Signoria, Florence

Hercules and Cacus is an Italian Renaissance sculpture in marble to the right of the entrance of the Palazzo Vecchio in the Piazza della Signoria, Florence, Italy.

It has a complicated and highly political history, but the finished work is by the Florentine sculptor Baccio Bandinelli mostly from 1525 to completion in 1534. It was commissioned as a pendant to Michelangelo's David, which had been commissioned by the republican council of Florence, under Piero Soderini (gonfaloniere for life), to commemorate the victory over the Medici.

== History of the commission ==
The commission for a colossus—the completed statue stands 5.05 metres (16 feet 7 inches) tall—was originally given to Michelangelo in 1508 by Piero Soderini, leader of the Republic of Florence after the expulsion of the Medici family in 1494. It was meant to complement the David as a symbol of the republic. But the exceptionally large block did not arrive in Florence, and Michelangelo was soon busy with other projects. In 1512 the Medici returned to power.

The commission was appropriated by the pope Clement VII (Giulio de'Medici), some time during or before 1523. He was shown a wax bozzetto by Bandinelli, who received the commission. The quarried block of white Carrara marble finally arrived in Florence in 1525. It has been suggested that the block of marble was not large enough for Bandinelli's design and he was to make a new one, however, the reason for the change may have been purely for symbolic reasons. His first design was extremely active and violent, and it is likely that the Medici did not want such a harsh reminder of their brutal return to power. Vasari stated that Bandinelli had already carved the sculpture as far as the abdomen of Hercules when, in 1527, the pope was taken prisoner in Rome during its sacking, and the Medici were exiled once again from Florence.

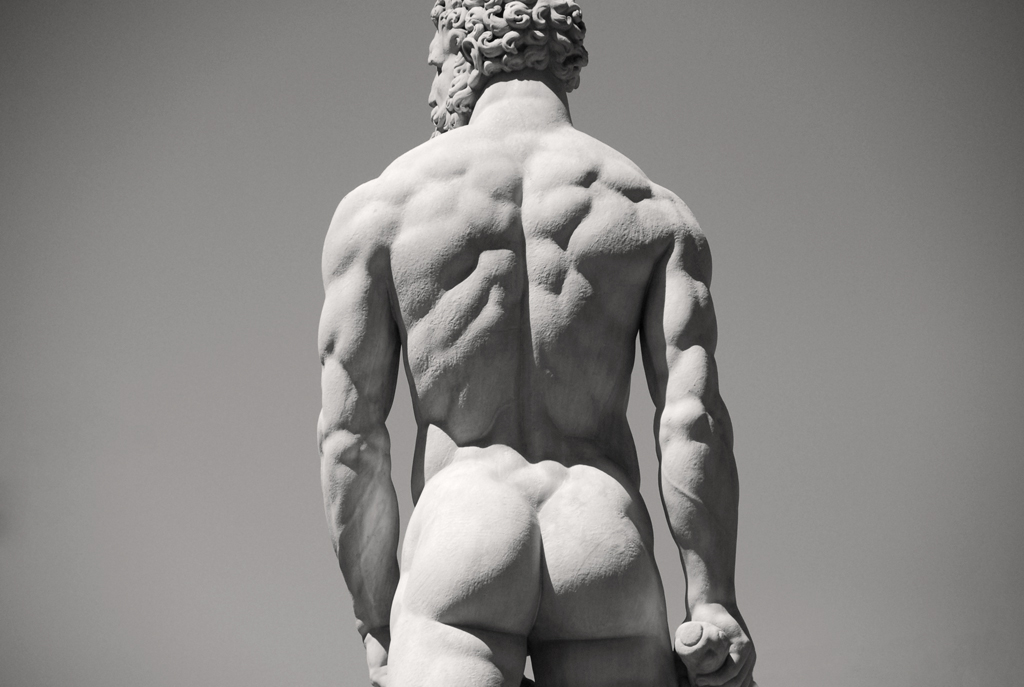
Hercules (detail)

Meanwhile, in Florence, the republican enemies of the Medici took advantage of the chaos to expel Ippolito de' Medici from the city and return the marble to Michelangelo. Vasari stated a change in subject, which is substantiated by a terracotta bozzetto, as a Samson Slaying the Philistines. This was probably to separate the project from the Medici and was allowed due to Bandinelli, as a supporter of the Medici, having to leave the city. In 1530, Emperor Charles V assisted the Medici in retaking possession of Florence after a long siege. Pope Clement VII subsequently installed his illegitimate son Alessandro de Medici as duke of Florence. Bandinelli then returned and continued his work on the statue. Finally in 1534 the work on the statue was finished transported from his studio to the Piazza della Signoria and placed on its marble pedestal as part of the ringiera.

Although descriptions of its unveiling in 1534 provided verbal and written criticisms of the marble, most were instead aimed at the Medici family for dissolving the Republic and were not aesthetic. A few of the writers of these hypercritical verses were imprisoned by Alessandro de' Medici, further suggesting a political commentary. The two harshest critics were Giorgio Vasari and Benvenuto Cellini, both of whom were champions of Michelangelo and rivals of Bandinelli for Medici patronage. Vasari lamented the change of hands from Michelangelo to Bandinelli, and the change of design. Cellini referred to the emphatic musculature as "a sack full of melons", forgetting that Michelangelo had received similar deprecation previously by Leonardo da Vinci. Neither Vasari nor Cellini can be viewed as unbiased due to their rivalry with Bandinelli. The Medici were quite satisfied and rewarded Bandinelli greatly for his efforts with land, money, and he was later placed in charge of all sculptural and architectural programs for the Medici under Cosimo I.

During a restoration in 1994 it was discovered that it consists of at least twenty pieces of marble.

== Subject ==
Here, Hercules, who killed the fire-belching monster Cacus during his tenth labor for stealing cattle, is the symbol of physical strength, which juxtaposed nicely with David as a symbol of spiritual strength, both symbols desired by the Medici. This marble group shows the basic theme of the victor (the Medici) and the vanquished (the republicans). The pause suggests the leniency of the Medici to those who would concede to their rule, and served as a warning to those who would not, as this pause can be indefinite or simply temporary.
