= Baccio Bandinelli =

Italian artist (1493–1560)

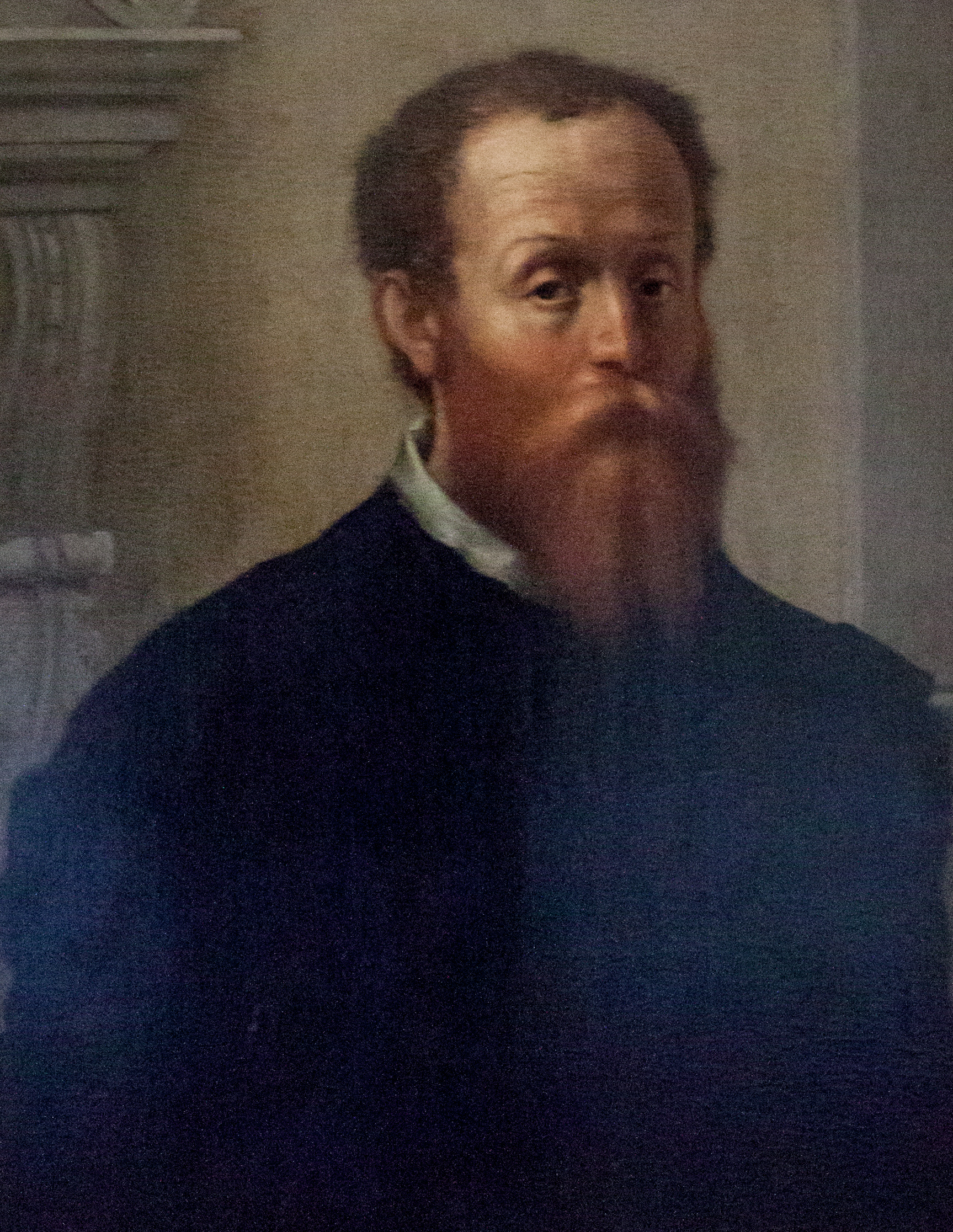
Self-portrait of Bartolommeo Bandinelli, 16th century

Baccio Bandinelli (also called Bartolomeo Brandini; 12 November 1493 – shortly before 7 February 1560) was an Italian Renaissance sculptor, draughtsman, and painter.

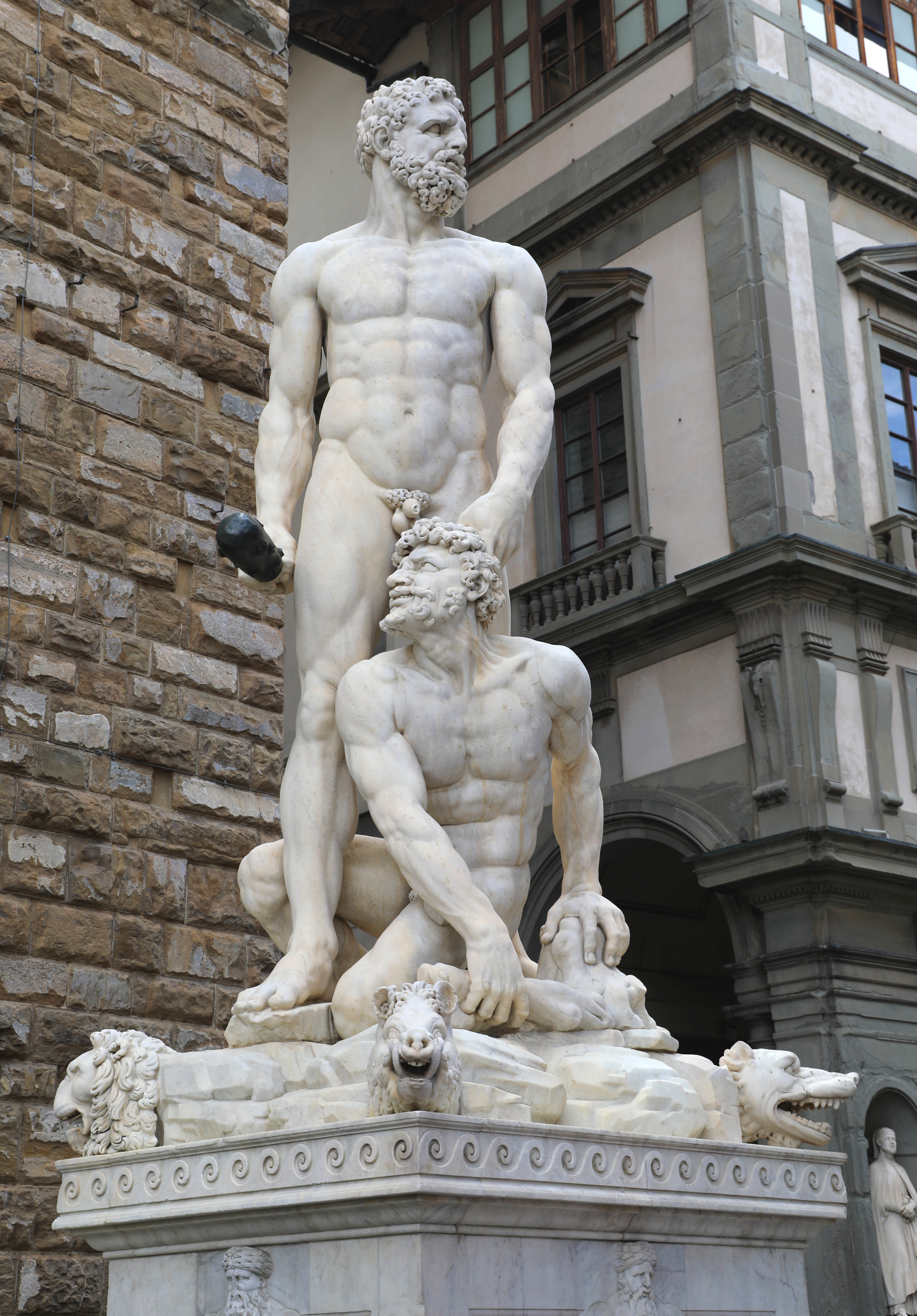
Hercules and Cacus, 1530–1534

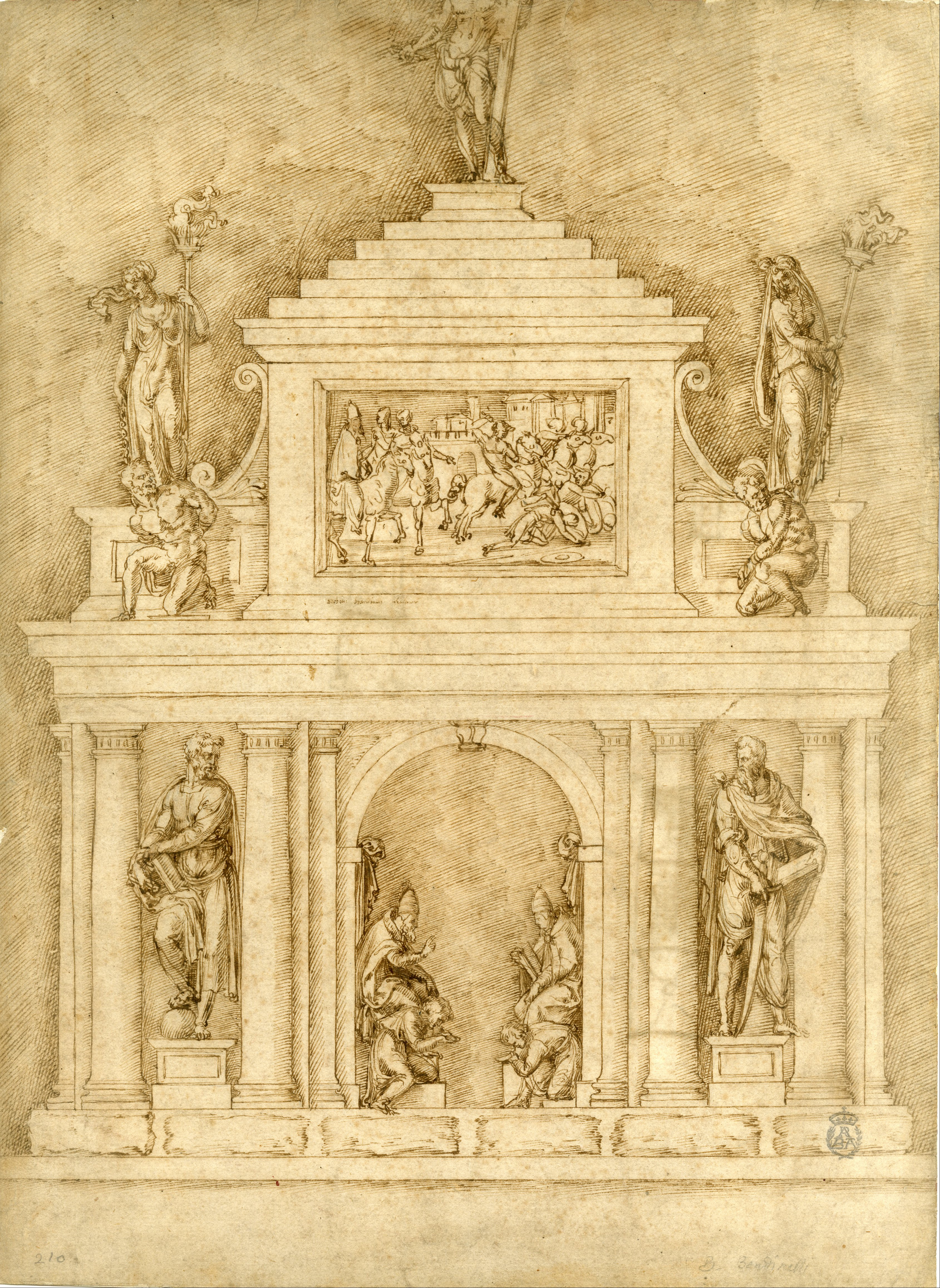
Drawing of the monument for Pope Leo X and Clement VII

== Biography ==
Bandinelli was the son of a prominent Florentine goldsmith, and first apprenticed in his shop. As a boy, he was apprenticed under Giovanni Francesco Rustici, a sculptor friend of Leonardo da Vinci. Among his earliest works was a Saint Jerome in wax, made for Giuliano de' Medici, identified as Bandinelli's by John Pope-Hennessy.

Giorgio Vasari, a former pupil in Bandinelli's workshop, claimed Bandinelli was driven by jealousy of Benvenuto Cellini and Michelangelo; and recounts that:

(When) the cartoon of Michelangelo in the Council Hall ("Battle of Cascina" at Palazzo Vecchio) was uncovered, and all the artists ran to copy it, and Baccio (most frequently) among (them),... having counterfeited the key of the chamber. In... 1512, Piero Soderini was deposed and the... Medici reinstated. In the tumult, therefore, Baccio, being by himself, secretly cut the cartoon into several pieces. Some said he did it that he might have a piece of the cartoon always near him, and others that he wanted to prevent other youths from making use of it; others again say that he did it out of affection for Leonardo da Vinci, or from the hatred he bore to Michelangelo. The loss anyhow to the city was no small one, and Baccio's fault very great.

Bandinelli's lifelong obsession with Michelangelo is a recurring theme in assessments of his career.

Bandinelli was a leader in the group of Florentine Mannerists who were inspired by the revived interest in Donatello attendant on the installation of Donatello's bas-relief panels for the pulpit in San Lorenzo, 1515. The artist presented his relief of the Deposition to Charles V at Genoa in 1529; though the relief has been lost, a bronze from it by Antonio Susini in 1600 (Musée du Louvre) shows the decisive inspiration of Donatello's emotional pitch and intensity; Bandinelli made several drawings of the Donatello reliefs, though later in life he disparaged them in a letter to Cosimo I de' Medici.

His sculptures have never inspired the admiration given those of Michelangelo, especially the colossal (5.05 m) marble group of Hercules and Cacus (completed in 1534) in the Piazza della Signoria, Florence, and Adam and Eve in the Museo Nazionale del Bargello, which both stand within sight of some of Michelangelo's masterworks. Vasari said of him "He did nothing but make bozzetti and finished little", and modern commentators have remarked on the vitality of Bandinelli's terracotta models contrasted with the finished marbles: "all the freshness of his first approach to a subject was lost in the laborious execution in marble... A brilliant draughtsman and excellent small-scale sculptor, he had a morbid fascination for colossi which he was ill-equipped to execute. His failure as a sculptor on a grand scale was accentuated by his desire to imitate Michelangelo."

Hercules and Cacus was commissioned by the Medici pope Clement VII, who had been shown a wax model. The supplied block of Carrara marble was not big enough to execute Bandinelli's original design. He had to make new wax models, one of which was chosen by the pope as the final draft. Bandinelli had already carved the sculpture as far as the abdomen of Hercules, when during the 1527 Sack of Rome, the pope was taken prisoner. Meanwhile, in Florence, republican enemies of the Medici took advantage of the chaos to exile Ippolito de' Medici. Bandinelli, a supporter of the Medici, was also exiled. In 1530 Emperor Charles V retook Florence after a long siege. Pope Clement VII subsequently installed his illegitimate son Alessandro de' Medici as duke of Tuscany. Bandinelli then returned to Florence and continued work on the statue, which was completed in 1534 and transported from the cathedral's workshop to its present marble pedestal. But from the moment it was unveiled, it faced ridicule; Cellini compared the ponderous group to 'a sack full of melons'. Afterwards, Bandinelli tried to sabotage Cellini's career. The statue was restored between February and April 1994.

Bandinelli's drawings, which have in the past masqueraded as Michelangelo's in connoisseurs' collections, came into their own in the later twentieth century.

Among Bandinelli's pupils were Vasari and Francesco de' Rossi (Il Salviati). His sons Clemente, a collaborator in his studio, and Michelangelo Bandinelli were also sculptors.

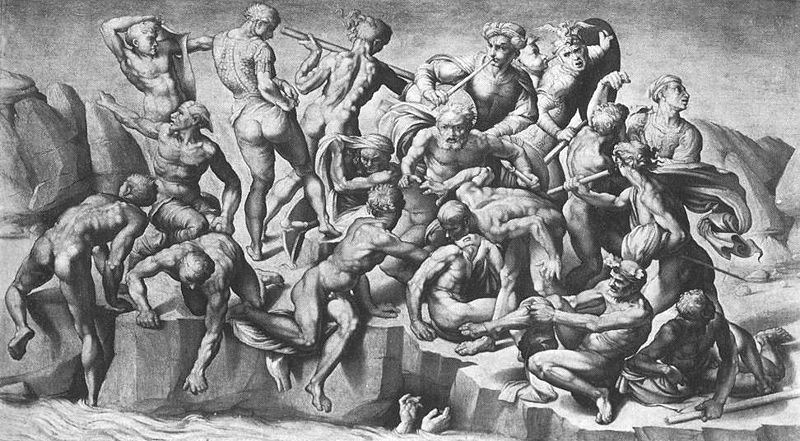
The cartoon of the Battle of Cascina by Michelangelo

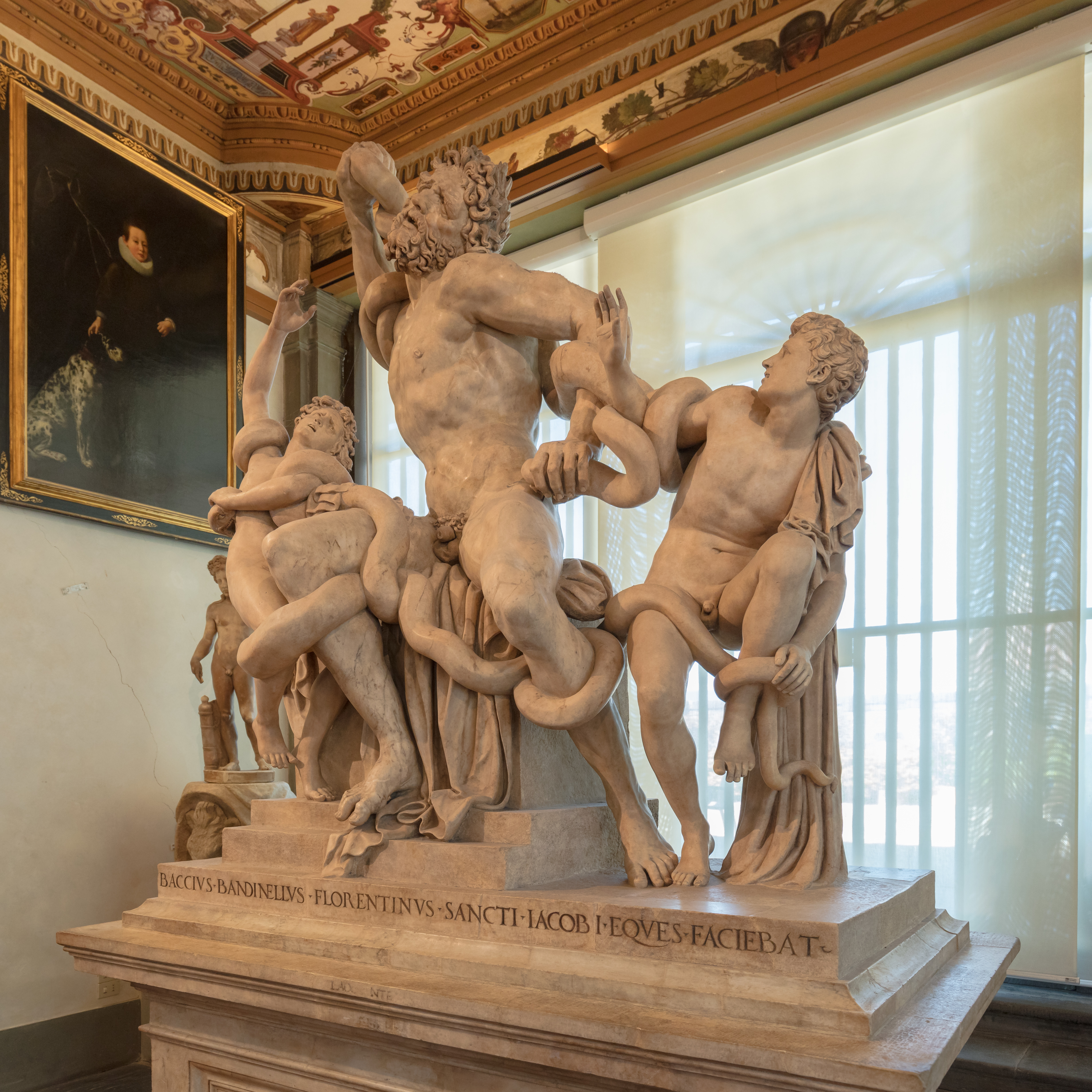
Bandinelli's copy of the Laocoön Group

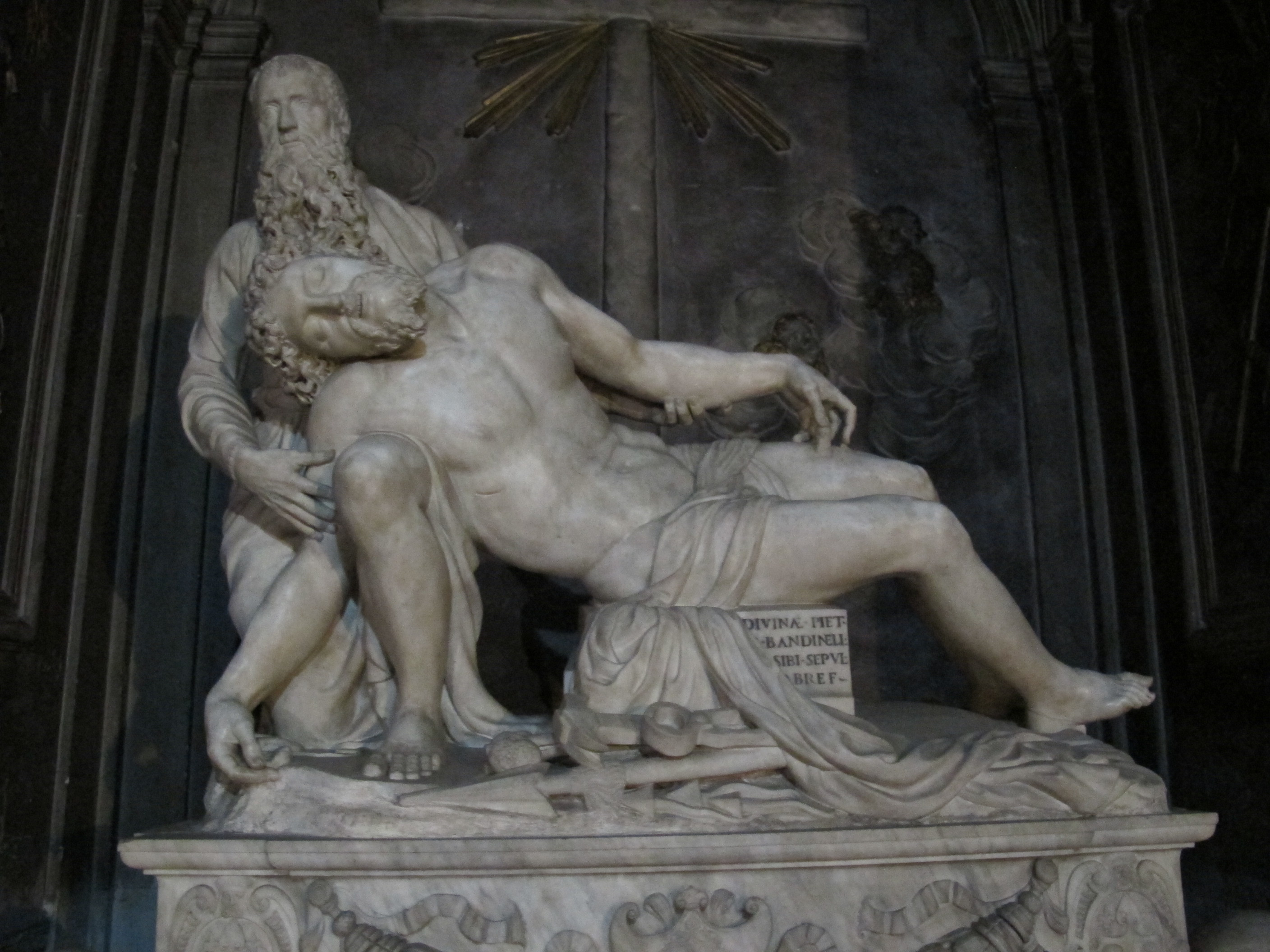
Pietà, Basilica della Santissima Annunziata, Florence

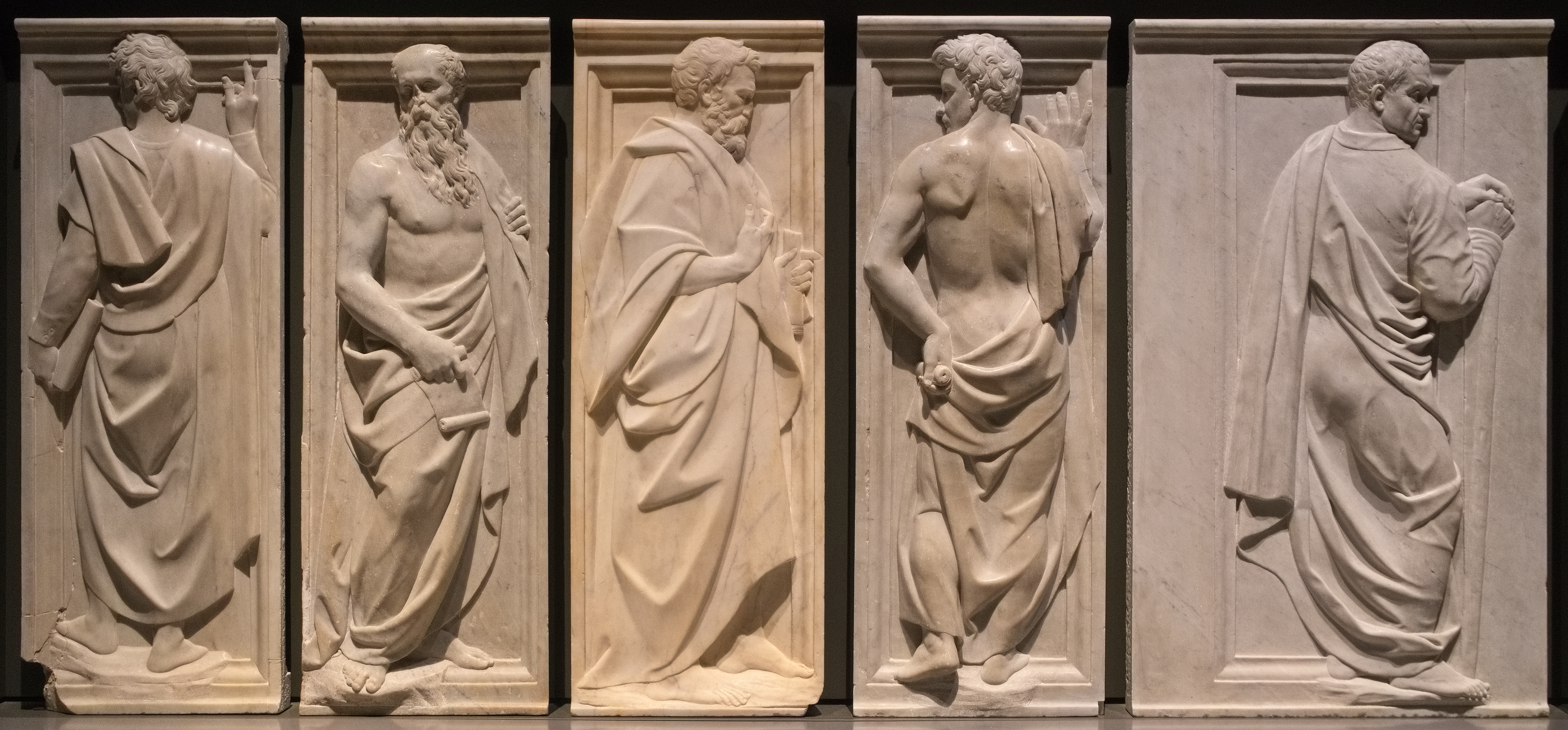
Baccio Bandinelli and collaborators, 5 of 24 reliefs from the choir of Santa Maria del Fiore, 1547–72, Museo dell'Opera del Duomo, Florence

== Selected works ==
Baccio Bandinelli's works include:

- copy of the Laocoön group, at the time in the Cortile del Belvedere, commissioned by Pope Leo X as a gift to François I. Bandinelli boasted that he would exceed the original, and when he was finished, after a hiatus during the pontificate of Adrian VI, the Medici Pope Clement VII could not bear to part with it, sent some antiquities to the King of France in its stead, and sent Baccio's Laocoön to Florence. It remains at the Uffizi.
- Tombs of the Medici popes Leo X and Clement VII in Santa Maria sopra Minerva (1536–41).
- Bust of Cosimo I de' Medici (c. 1539–40) (Metropolitan Museum of Art, acc. no. 1987.280) This had been locked away in a vault in a Swiss bank until a dealer's tip led the curator Olga Raggio to its rediscovery.
- Monument to Giovanni delle Bande Nere (1540–54), a seated figure on a magnificent pedestal, in piazza San Lorenzo, Florence
- Pietà in the Basilica della Santissima Annunziata, Florence, where Bandinelli portrayed himself in the figure of Joseph of Arimathea. Bandinelli is buried in the chapel, with his wife Giacoma Doni.
- Ceres and Apollo (1552–1556) for niches in the façade of Buontalenti's grotto in the Boboli Gardens

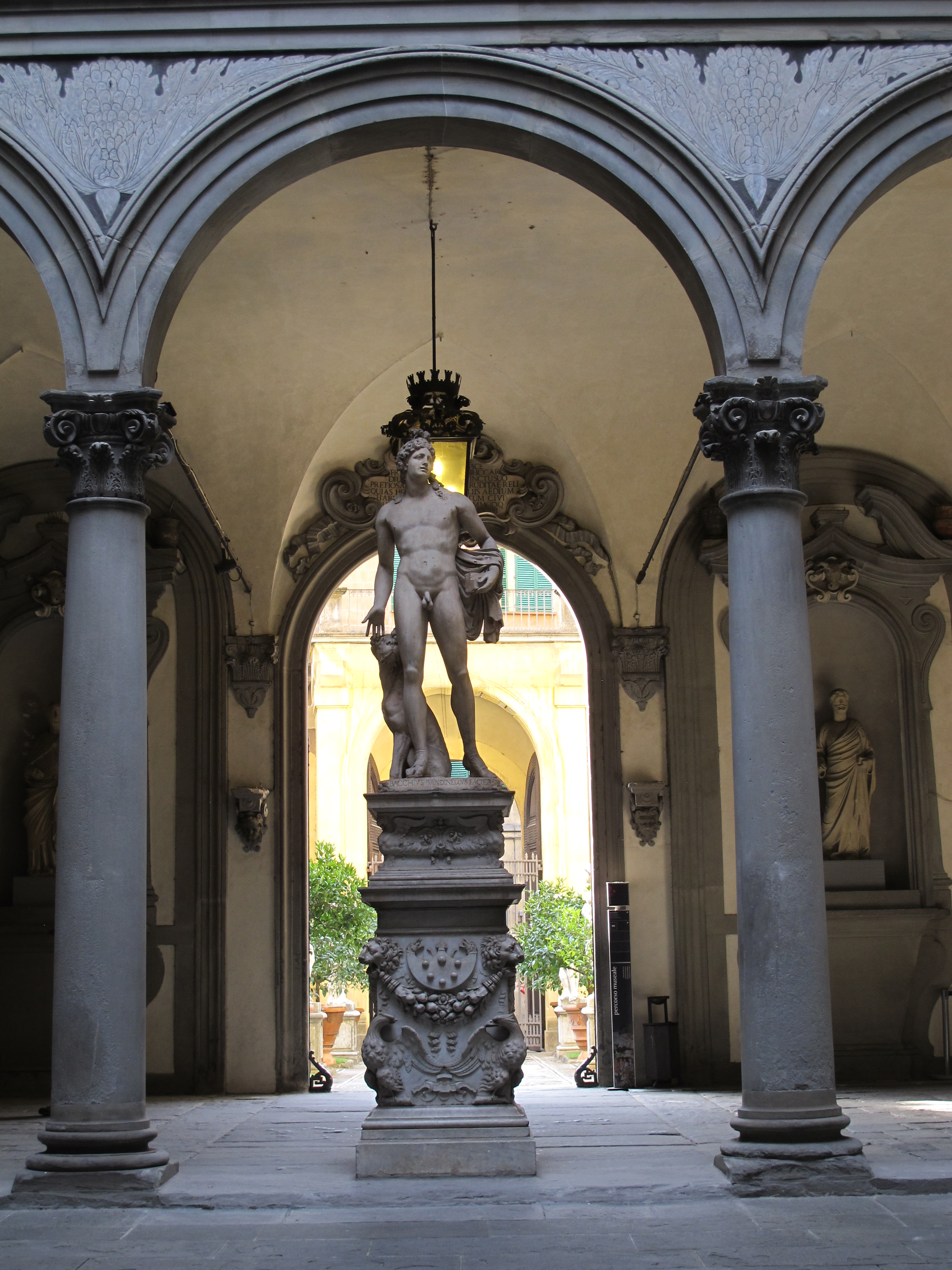
Orpheus, now in the courtyard of the Palazzo Medici-Riccardi, Florence

- Orpheus for Palazzo Vecchio, now in the courtyard of the Palazzo Medici-Riccardi. One of Bandinelli's few signed works.
- Works for the Duomo, Florence, including the high altar and its Adam and Eve (1551), now in the Bargello and Pietà now in the crypt of Santa Croce; much-praised bas-reliefs made for the enclosure of the choir, designed by the architect Giuliano di Baccio d'Angnolo (1555), now in the Museo dell'Opera del Duomo; Saint Peter, one of eight apostles by various sculptors in the piers of the crossing.
- Works in Palazzo Vecchio, including, in the Audience Hall, a statue of Grand Duke Cosimo I de' Medici and one of Pope Leo X blessing (finished after Bandinelli's death by Vincenzo de' Rossi)
- God the Father (1549) in Santa Croce cloister
- Andrea Doria as Neptune, outside Carrara Cathedral. When Carrara was lost for a short while to the Genoese Republic, Bandinelli was commissioned to sculpt Andrea Doria. Afterwards the Florentine Republic recaptured the city and such a symbol of Genoese dominion was rendered inappropriate, so the statue was renamed Neptune. This rechristening as the Roman sea divinity was suggested by the fountain sea creatures at the statue's base.
- In the Bargello are also a number of lesser works: Noah (bas-relief), portrait busts of Eleonora di Toledo and Cosimo I de' Medici, Venus, Leda, Hercules, Bacchus, Cleopatra, and a portrait bust of an unknown man.
- A youthful portrait by Andrea del Sarto c. 1517 is conserved at the Uffizi.

== See also ==
- Portrait of a Lady known as Smeralda Bandinelli by Botticelli (portrait of Baccio's grandmother)
