= Palazzo delle Assicurazioni Generali, Florence =

Palazzo in Florence

Coordinates: 43°46′10.85″N 11°15′18.62″E

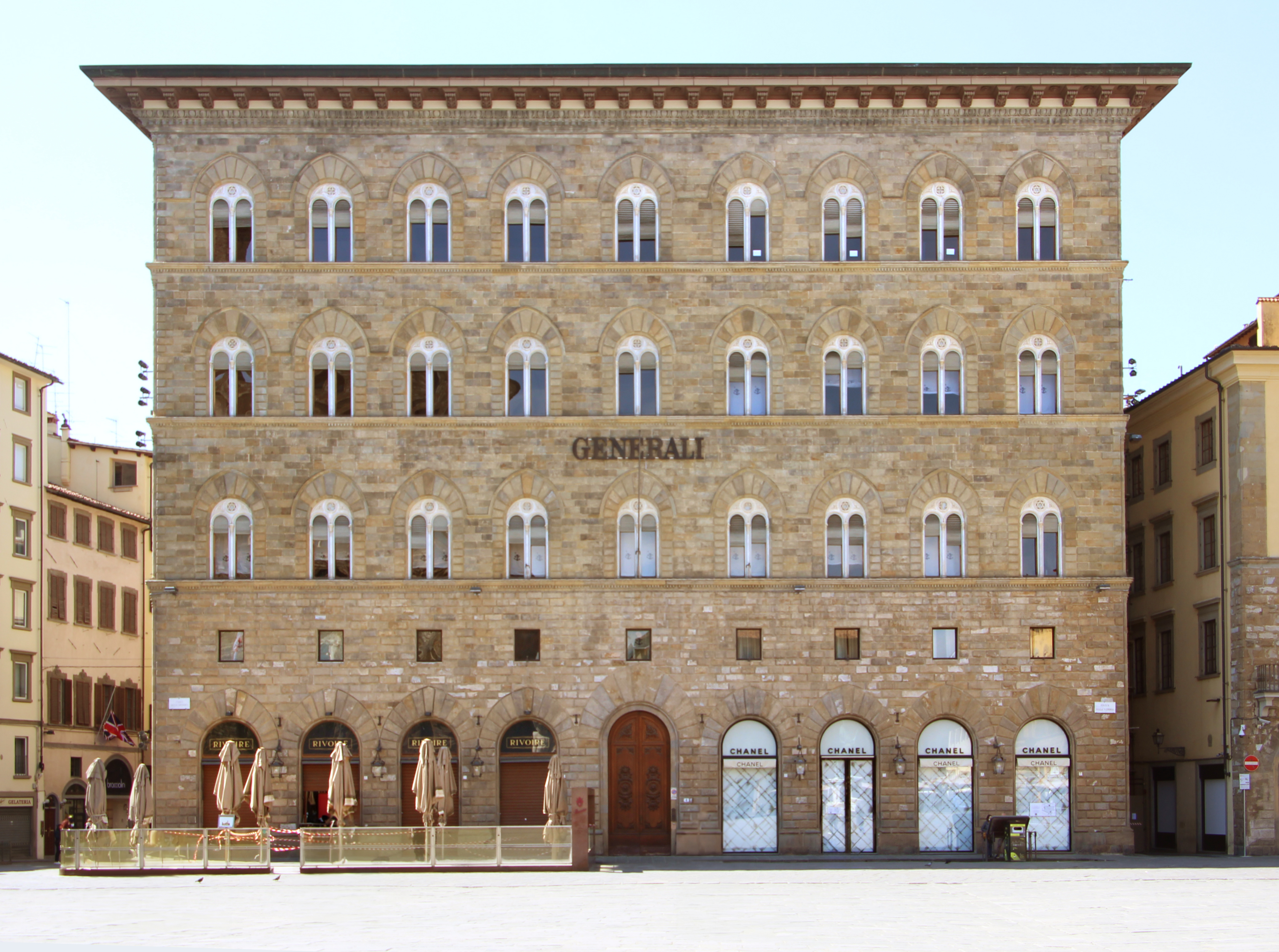
Palazzo delle Assicurazioni Generali in Florence

The Palazzo delle Assicurazioni Generali is a building in the Piazza della Signoria in Florence, Italy. Also known as the Palazzo Fenzi, it was built in 1871 by the Fenzi banking family and designed in the Neo-Renaissance style by Giuseppe Martelli. It is one of the very few purpose built commercial buildings in the centre of the city, though it housed on the upper floors reception rooms for the Fenzi family. The site was formerly occupied by the "Pisan Loggia" and the "Chiese de Santa Cecilia".

The building unsuccessfully vies for dominance in the piazza with the more historical and architecturally important Palazzo Signoria, today known as the Palazzo Vecchio. In spite of its height and size the architecture of the Palazzo delle Assicurazioni Generali harmonises with that of the surrounding buildings, and does not appear as a new imposter in the piazza. However, this is not a view shared by all, one source describes those buildings of Piazza della Signoria occupied by banks and Insurance companies as "seeming to belong to some cold northern climate rather than to the city that gave birth to the colour and vitality of the Renaissance" Part of the ground floor is home to one of Florence's more fashionable and historical cafés – "Rivoire", founded in 1872.
