= Rivoire =

Rivoire is a surname. Notable people with the surname include:

- André Rivoire (1872–1930), French poet and playwright
- Apollos Rivoire (1702–1754), French-American silversmith
- Raymond Rivoire (1884–1966), French sculptor

== See also ==
- Haute-Rivoire, commune in the Rhône department in eastern France
