= Italian Renaissance sculpture =

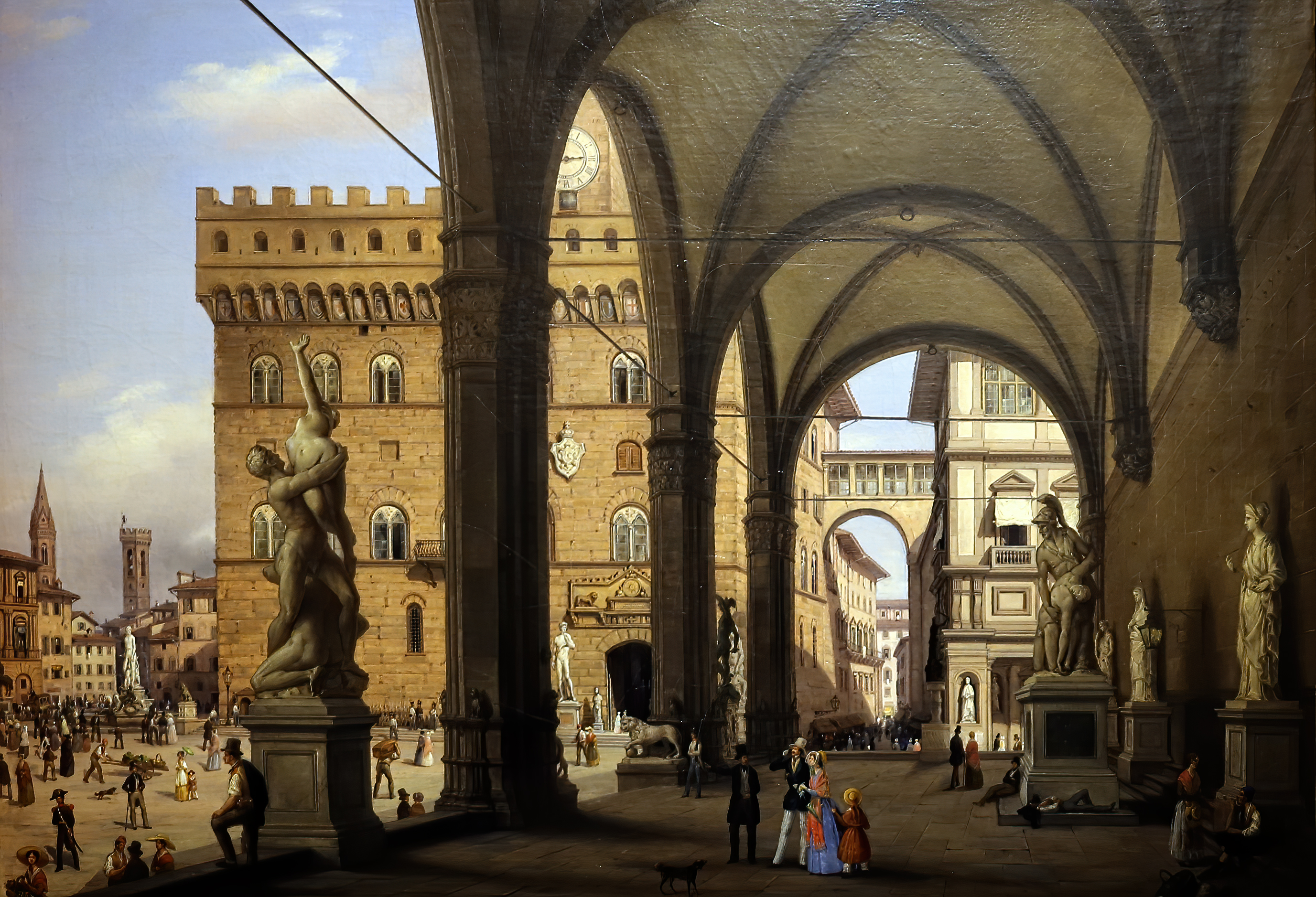
Painting of the Piazza della Signoria and Loggia dei Lanzi in Florence, 1830, Carlo Canella. From left, Fountain of Neptune, Rape of the Sabine by Giambologna, David by Michelangelo, one of the Medici Lions, Perseus with the Head of Medusa by Benvenuto Cellini, hiding Hercules and Cacus by Baccio Bandinelli. Away from the loggia wall, the Medici Pasquino Group, copying an ancient Roman subject.

Italian Renaissance sculpture was an important part of the art of the Italian Renaissance, in the early stages arguably representing the leading edge. The example of Ancient Roman sculpture hung very heavily over it, both in terms of style and the uses to which sculpture was put. In complete contrast to painting, there were many surviving Roman sculptures around Italy, above all in Rome, and new ones were being excavated all the time, and keenly collected. Apart from a handful of major figures, especially Michelangelo and Donatello, it is today less well-known than Italian Renaissance painting, but this was not the case at the time.

Italian Renaissance sculpture was dominated by the north, above all by Florence. This was especially the case in the quattrocento (15th century), after which Rome came to equal or exceed it as a centre, though producing few sculptors itself. Major Florentine sculptors in stone included (in rough chronological order, with dates of death) Orcagna (1368), Nanni di Banco (1421), Filippo Brunelleschi (1446), Nanni di Bartolo (1451), Lorenzo Ghiberti (1455), Donatello (1466), Bernardo (1464) and his brother Antonio Rossellino (1479), Andrea del Verrocchio (1488), Antonio del Pollaiuolo (1498), Michelangelo (1564), and Jacopo Sansovino (1570). Elsewhere there was the Siennese Jacopo della Quercia (1438), from Lombardy Pietro Lombardo (1515) and his sons, Giovanni Antonio Amadeo (1522), Andrea Sansovino (1529), Vincenzo Danti (1576), Leone Leoni (1590), and Giambologna (1608, born in Flanders).

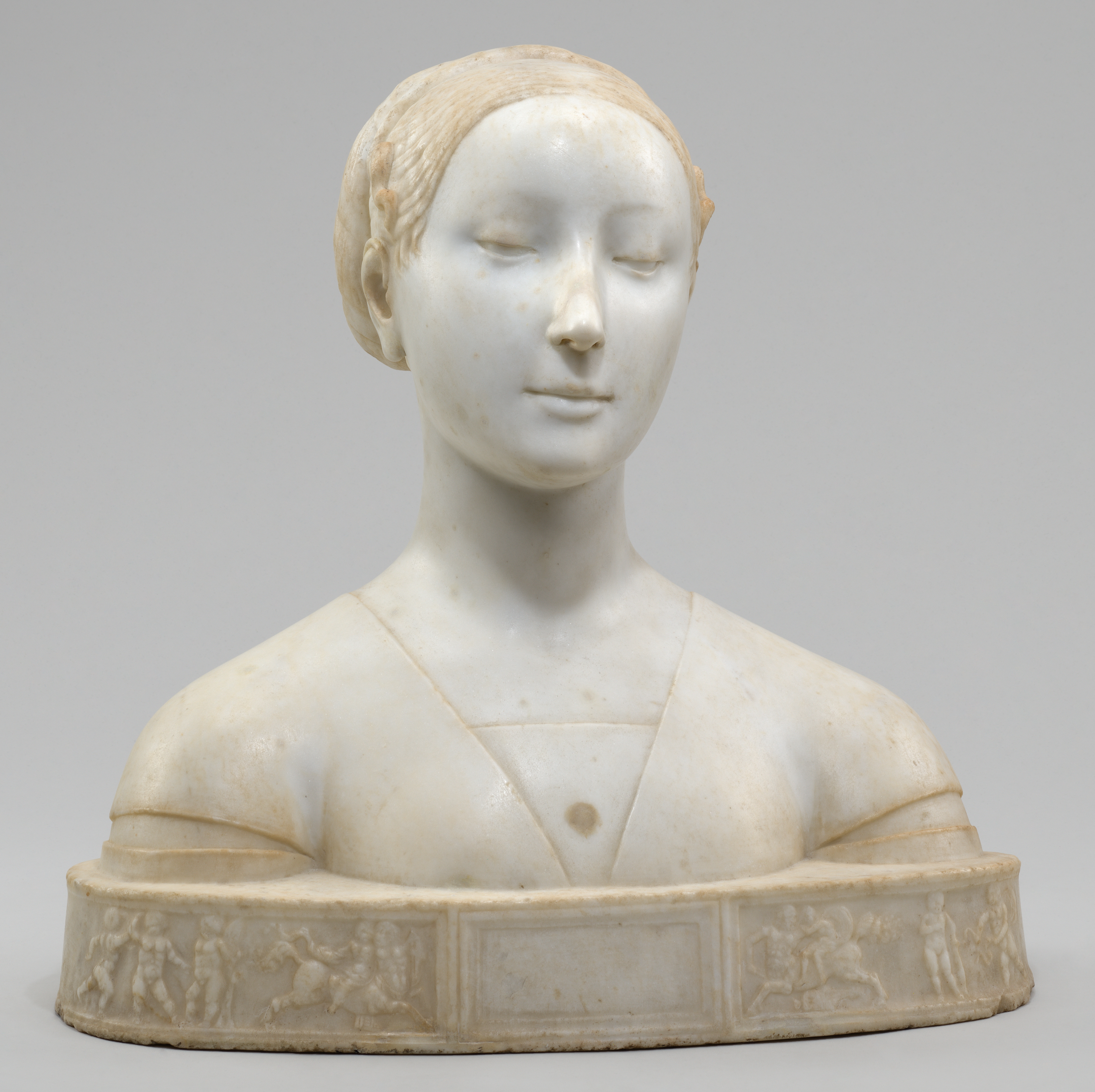
Francesco Laurana, A Princess of the House of Aragon, c. 1475

While church sculpture continued to provide more large commissions than any other source, followed by civic monuments, a number of other settings for sculpture appeared or increased in prominence during the period. Secular portraits had previously mostly been funerary art, and large tomb monuments became considerably more elaborate. Relief panels were used in a number of materials and settings, or sometimes treated as portable objects like paintings. Small bronzes, usually of secular subjects, became increasingly important from the late 15th century onwards, while new forms included the medal, initially mostly presenting people rather than events, and the plaquette with a small scene in metal relief.

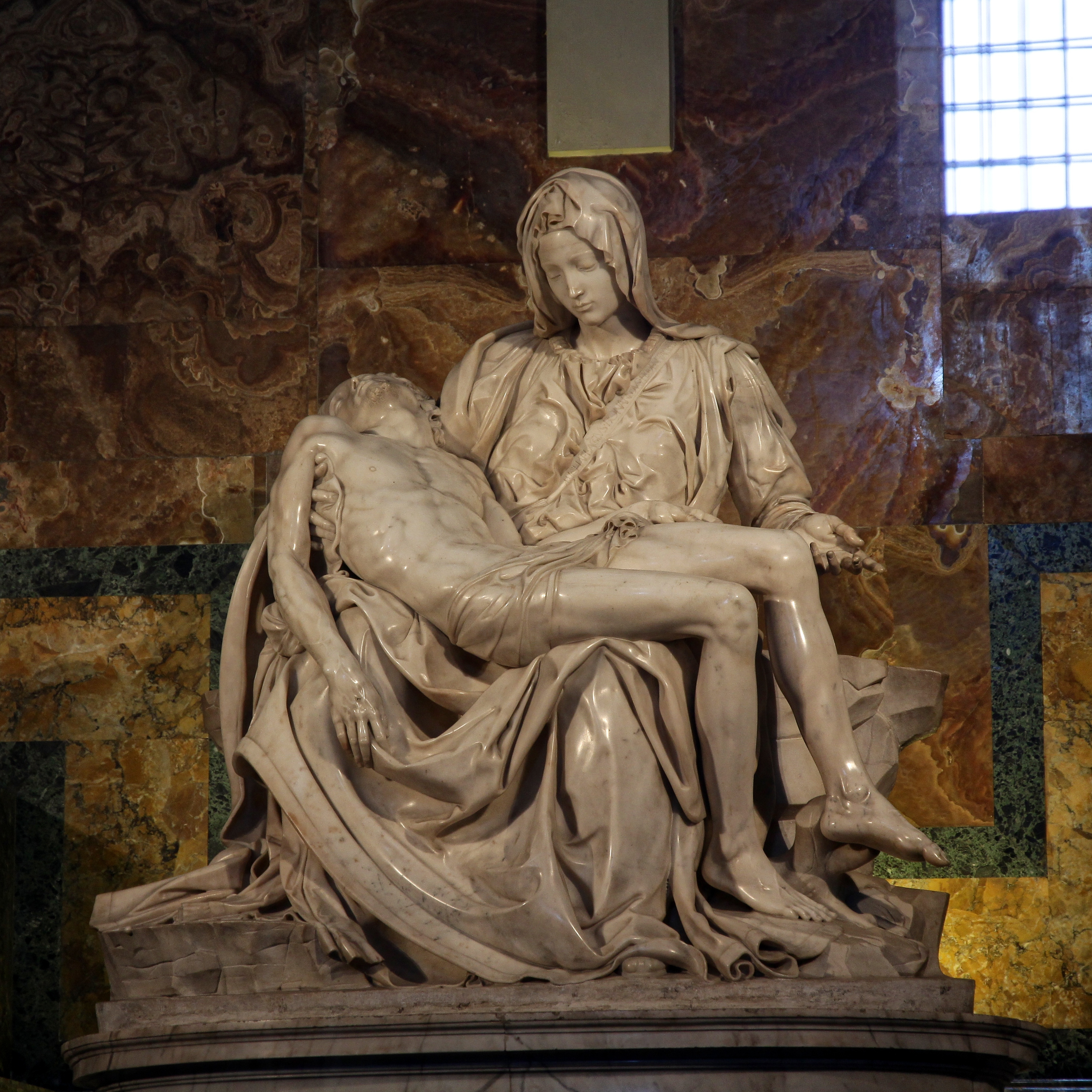
Michelangelo's Pietà, completed in 1499.

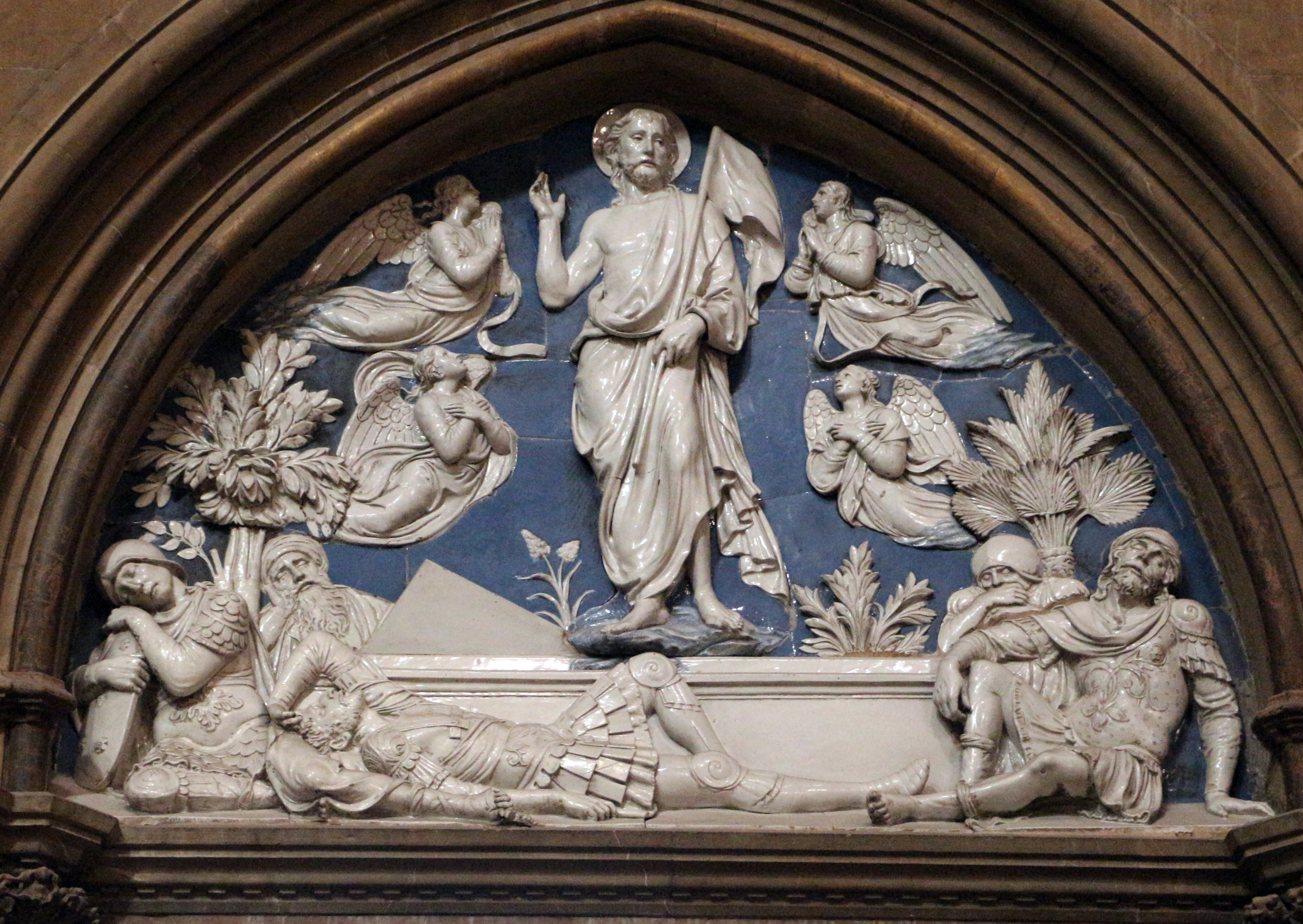
Luca della Robbia, Resurrection, glazed terracotta, 1445.

The term "sculptor" only came into use during the 15th century; before that sculptors were known as stonecarvers, woodcarvers and so forth. Statua ("statue", and the art of making them) was another new Italian word, replacing medieval terms such as figura, simulacrum and imago, also used for painted images.

== Periods ==
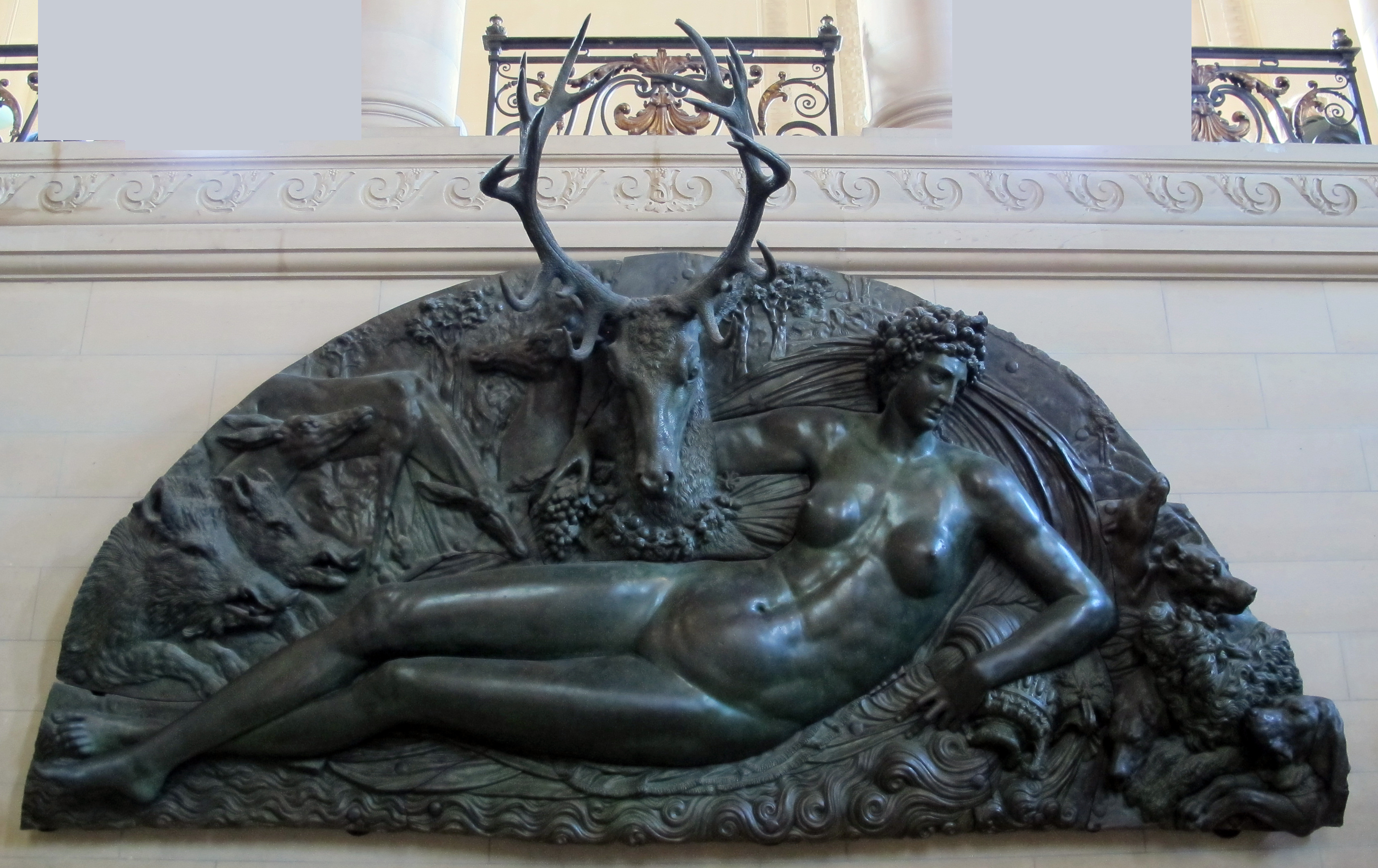
Nymph of Fontainebleau, Benvenuto Cellini, bronze, c. 1543, Louvre (H. 2.05 m; L. 4.09 m)

Gothic architecture, and Gothic art in general, had a limited penetration in Italy, arriving late and mostly affecting the far north, Venice and Lombardy in particular, often only as an ornamental style in borders and capitals. Classical traditions were more deeply rooted than north of the Alps, making a deliberate revival of classical style less of a sharp change. In the Trecento (14th century), sculptors might be asked to work on buildings generally in a Gothic style, or those that were not. Some sculptors could adjust their styles somewhat to fit in, others did not. This complicated situation makes giving a clear start date for Renaissance sculpture difficult if not impossible.

As with Italian Renaissance painting, sculpture is conventionally divided into Early Renaissance, High Renaissance, Mannerist and Late Renaissance periods. Conveniently, 1400 and 1500 work fairly well as dates to mark significant changes in style, with key turning points being the competition for designs for the doors of the Florence Baptistery, announced in late 1400, and Michelangelo's Pietà, completed in 1499, and his David, begun in 1501. Sometimes the 15th century is divided around 1450 (or earlier) into a "First Renaissance" and "Second Renaissance", to some extent following Vasari.

Mannerist style starts to emerge around 1520, but the Sack of Rome in 1527, which greatly shook up and dispersed what had become the leading centre, provides a generally accepted end to the High Renaissance phase; the Medici were expelled from Florence the same year, displacing other artists. Though his workshop continued to turn out work in his style, the death of Giambologna in 1608, when Baroque sculpture was already well-established in Rome, can be taken to mark the end of the period.

== Materials ==
Generally, "sculpture of any quality" was more expensive than an equivalent in painting, and when in bronze dramatically so. The painted Equestrian Monument of Niccolò da Tolentino of 1456 by Andrea del Castagno appears to have cost only 24 florins, while Donatello's equestrian bronze of Gattamelata, several years earlier, has been "estimated conservatively" at 1,650 florins. Michelangelo was paid 3,000 florins for painting the Sistine Chapel ceiling, while Ghiberti said his first set of doors for the Florence Baptistery, a century earlier, had cost 22,000, with perhaps a quarter representing the cost of materials.

Understandably, sculptors tended "to produce the best work in the most durable materials", stone or metal; there was a great deal of quicker and cheaper work in other materials that has mostly not survived. Sculptors made considerable use of drawings, and then of small and sometimes full-size modelli or maquettes in clay, with an internal framework of iron rods where necessary. But such models were rarely fired, and very few have survived. Leonardo da Vinci's project for the Sforza Horse is an example.

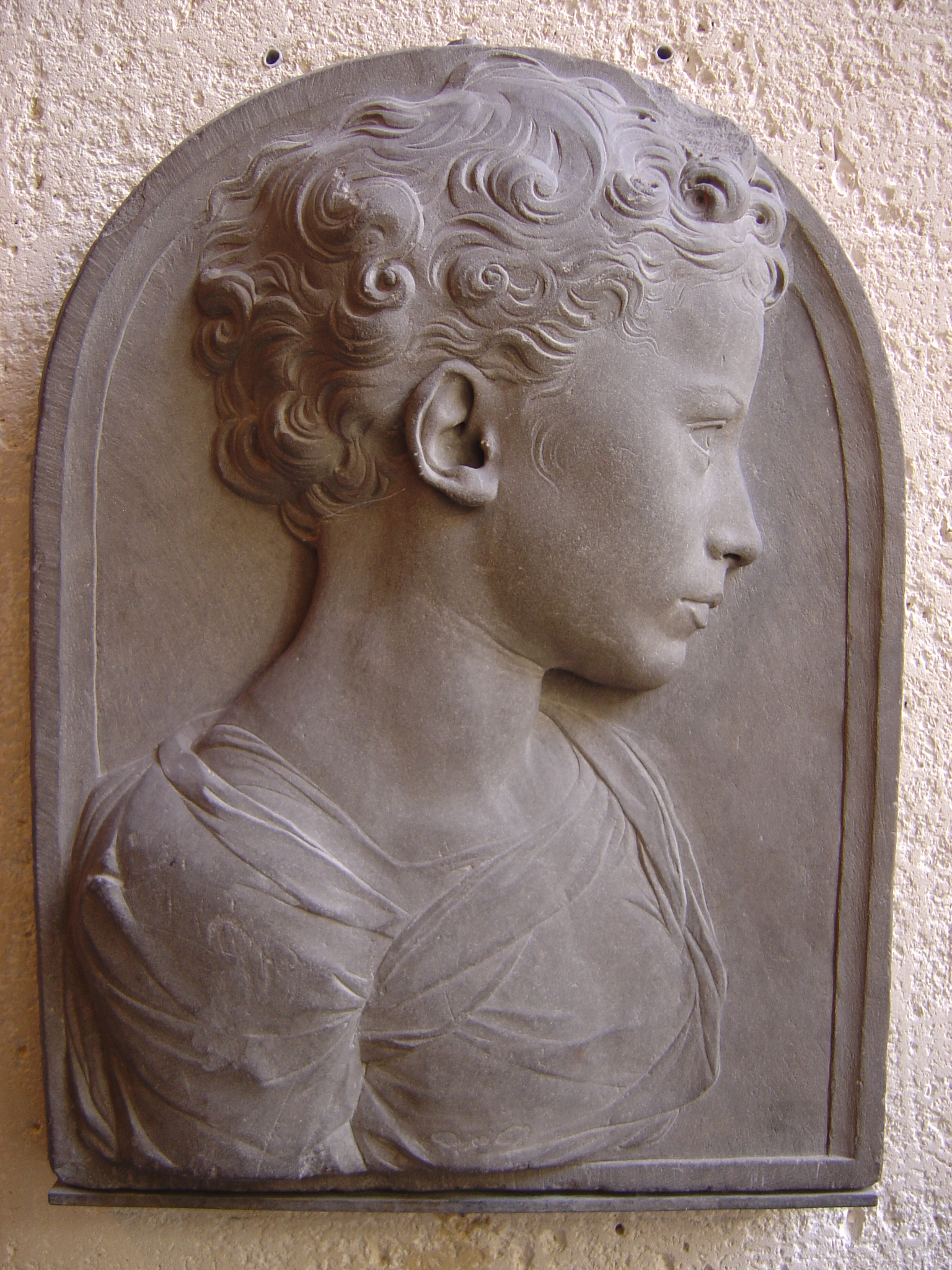
Relief bust of a boy in pietra serena, unknown, c. 1500

Many sculptors worked in several materials; for example Antonio del Pollaiuolo produced finished work in stone, bronze, wood, and terracotta, as well as painting in tempera, oils and fresco, and producing an important engraving. Donatello's Saint George, for the armourers and swordsmith's guild, at the Orsanmichele is in marble, but originally wore a bronze helmet and carried a sword. Donatello also worked in wood, terracotta and plaster. Especially in the 15th century, many architects were sculptors by training, and several practised as both for most of their career.

=== Stone ===
Marble, above all the pure white statuario grade of Carrara marble from the Apuan Alps in the north of Tuscany, was the most popular material for fine sculpture. Many Tuscan sculptors went to the quarries to "rough out" large works, some finishing them at Pisa nearby, so saving the cost of transporting large blocks. Long-distance transport was usually by boat, either by sea or down the Arno to Florence.

Although most parts of Italy had stone that could be carved, the other most favoured stone was also in the north, from Istria on the Adriatic, now in Croatia and partly Slovenia. Istrian stone is "marble-like stone, capable of a polished finish, but far more varied in texture and colour than the Apuan white marble". The grey Tuscan sandstone known as pietra serena was mainly used as building stone, often contrasting with white marble, as in Florence Cathedral. But it was sometimes used for sculpture, especially in smaller reliefs and carved scenes on buildings.

=== Metal ===
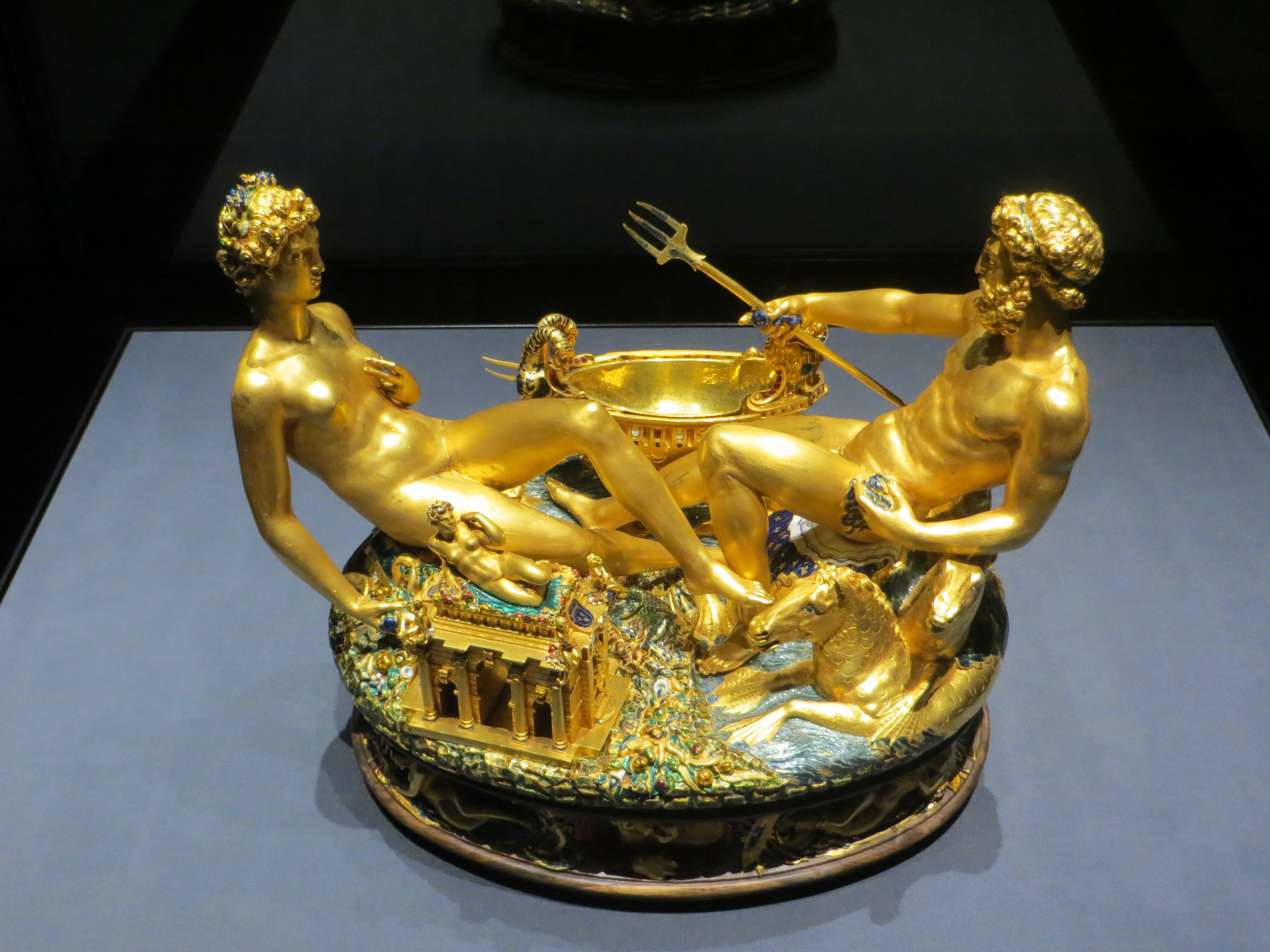
Cellini Salt Cellar, gold and enamels, by Benvenuto Cellini

A bronze sculpture was then about ten times more expensive than marble and the difficult founding or making the alloy, as well as the lost wax technique of casting was most often performed by the sculptor and his studio. This involved making a finished maquette in wax, or wax over clay, which is then destroyed during casting; the Horse and Rider is a very rare wax sculpture, probably a maquette that was never cast, which has survived; there is a small number of others, mostly small preliminary studies.

After the basic casting, which might be performed by outside specialists, there was a good deal of sculptor's work to be done in cleaning up, touching up and finishing the surface by polishing. In some cases this stage stretched over years, and used different sculptors.

Despite its cost and difficulty, following the classical taste known from ancient literature such as Pliny the Elder, and the very few ancient examples then known, bronze enjoyed a special prestige, even at a small scale. In late medieval Italy it had been mostly used for grand cathedral doors, as at Pisa and San Marco in Venice, and the early Renaissance continued this, most famously at the Florence Baptistry. Lorenzo Ghiberti's slightly over life-size bronze Saint John the Baptist for Orsanmichele (1412) was unprecedented.

Bronze might be gilded. A range of metals were used for casts of portrait medals of princely, or just wealthy, patrons, and sometimes for plaquettes. Bronze was the normal metal, but a few might be cast in gold or silver, for presentation to persons of the same or higher rank, and some in lead. Especially in the princely courts, above all the richest, Milan, small cast figures and sculpted objects such as inkwells were often made in gold and silver, but almost all of these have been melted down for their bullion value at some point. The famous gold Cellini Salt Cellar, made in 1543 for Francis I of France by Benvenuto Cellini is almost the sole survivor in gold, now in Vienna. The set of 12 silver-gilt cups called the Aldobrandini Tazze were made for an Italian family before 1603, but perhaps not by Italians. The Ghisi Shield of 1554 is another example of tiny scenes in relief.

=== Wood ===
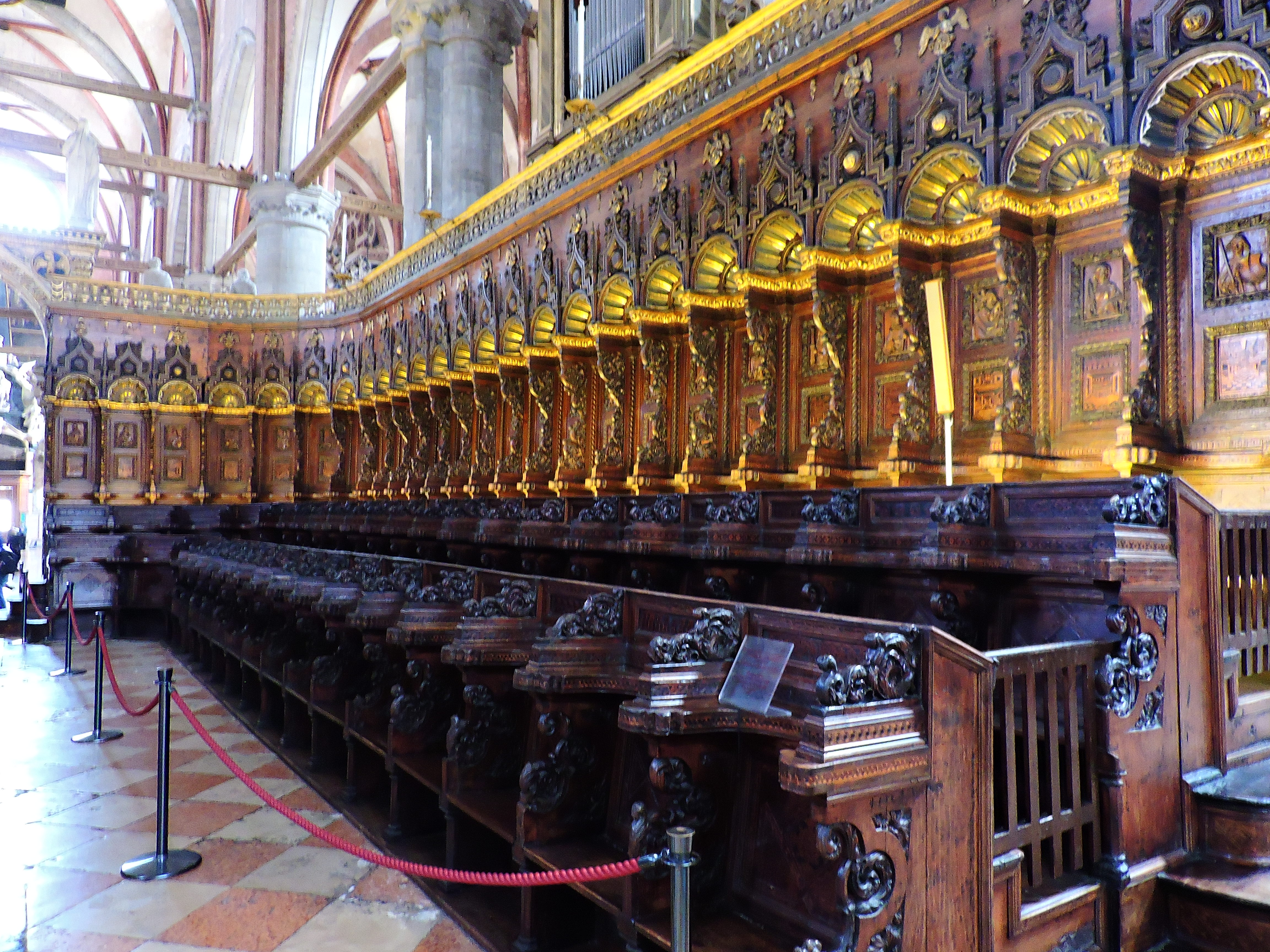
Choir stalls at the Frari, Venice

Unlike north of the Alps, wood was not a prestigious material, but because of its light weight continued to be used for Crucifixion figures, often hung in mid-air or on walls in churches, for example the Brunelleschi Crucifix in Santa Maria Novella. Other exceptions included Donatello's several figures for the altarpiece of the Frari church in Venice, his Penitent Magdalene and works by Francesco di Valdambrino in Tuscany around 1410. When wood was used, it was usually painted, either by a painter or the sculptor or his workshop. Decorative carvings in wood were common, for furniture, panelling, and other uses. Choir stalls in large churches often included a good deal of sculpture; sometimes these included figures and narrative scenes. In the early 15th century, wood figures by Domenico di Niccolò dei Cori in Siena moved towards "a new eloquence in gesture and facial expression".

=== Terracotta ===
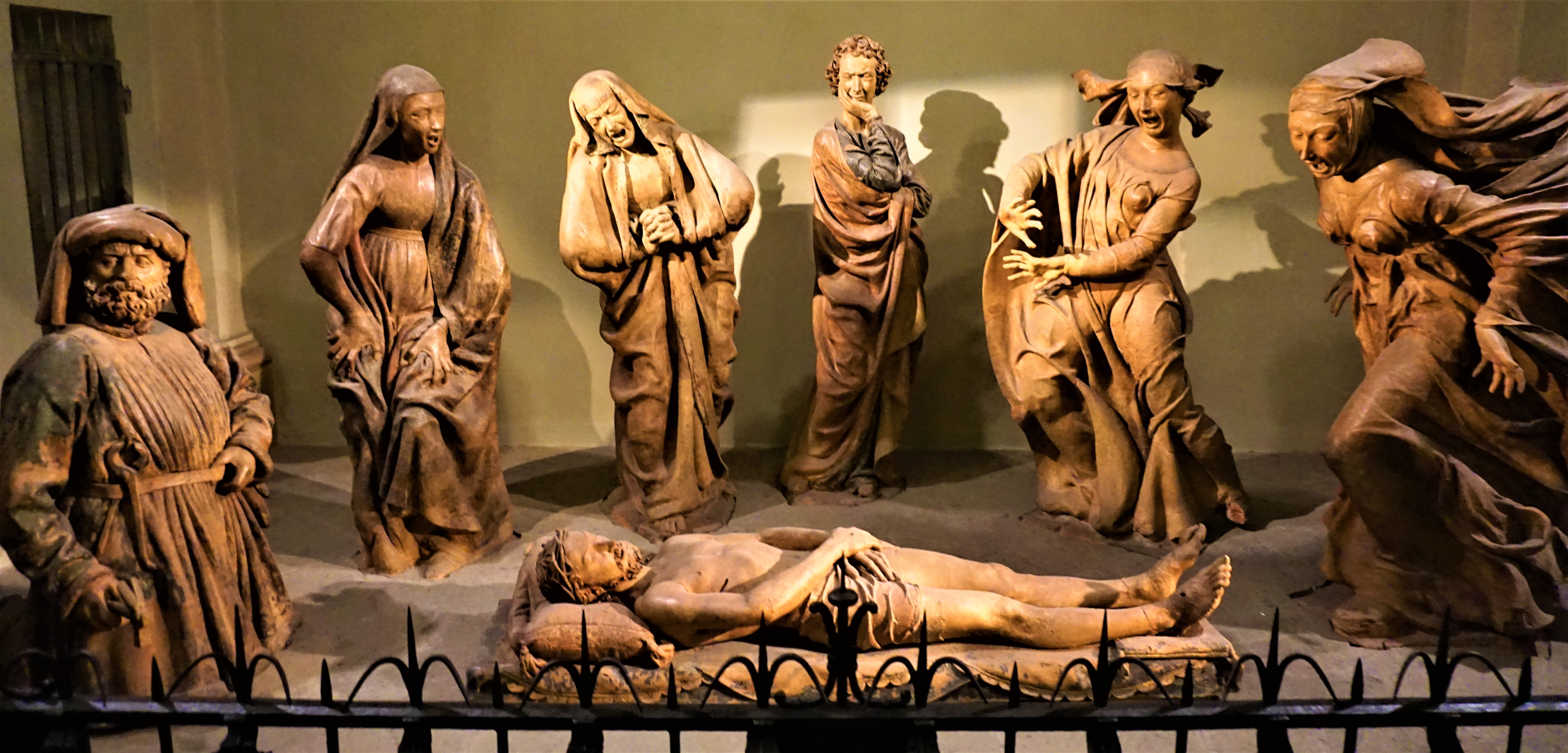
Lamentation group in terracotta, Niccolo dell'Arca, Santa Maria della Vita, Bologna, c. 1460 or later.

Apart from the widespread use of clay for modelli, normally left unfired, the three generations of the Della Robbia family in Florence ran a large workshop producing tin-glazed and brightly painted terracotta statuary, initially mostly religious reliefs for the exteriors of buildings, then later smaller works such as Madonnas for private chapels or bedrooms. Other artists developed a style of terracotta head and chest portraits. Several works of finished monumental sculpture (rather than models or studies) were made in terracotta, mostly painted. These were mostly religious; a number of them were large groups with six or so mourners surrounding the dead Christ in a Lamentation of Christ. These were far cheaper than marble would have been, and the most famous group, by Niccolo dell'Arca for a church in Bologna, uses terracotta to achieve effects of flying drapery that could not have been done in stone. Guido Mazzoni was another specialist in large terracotta groups.

=== Other materials ===
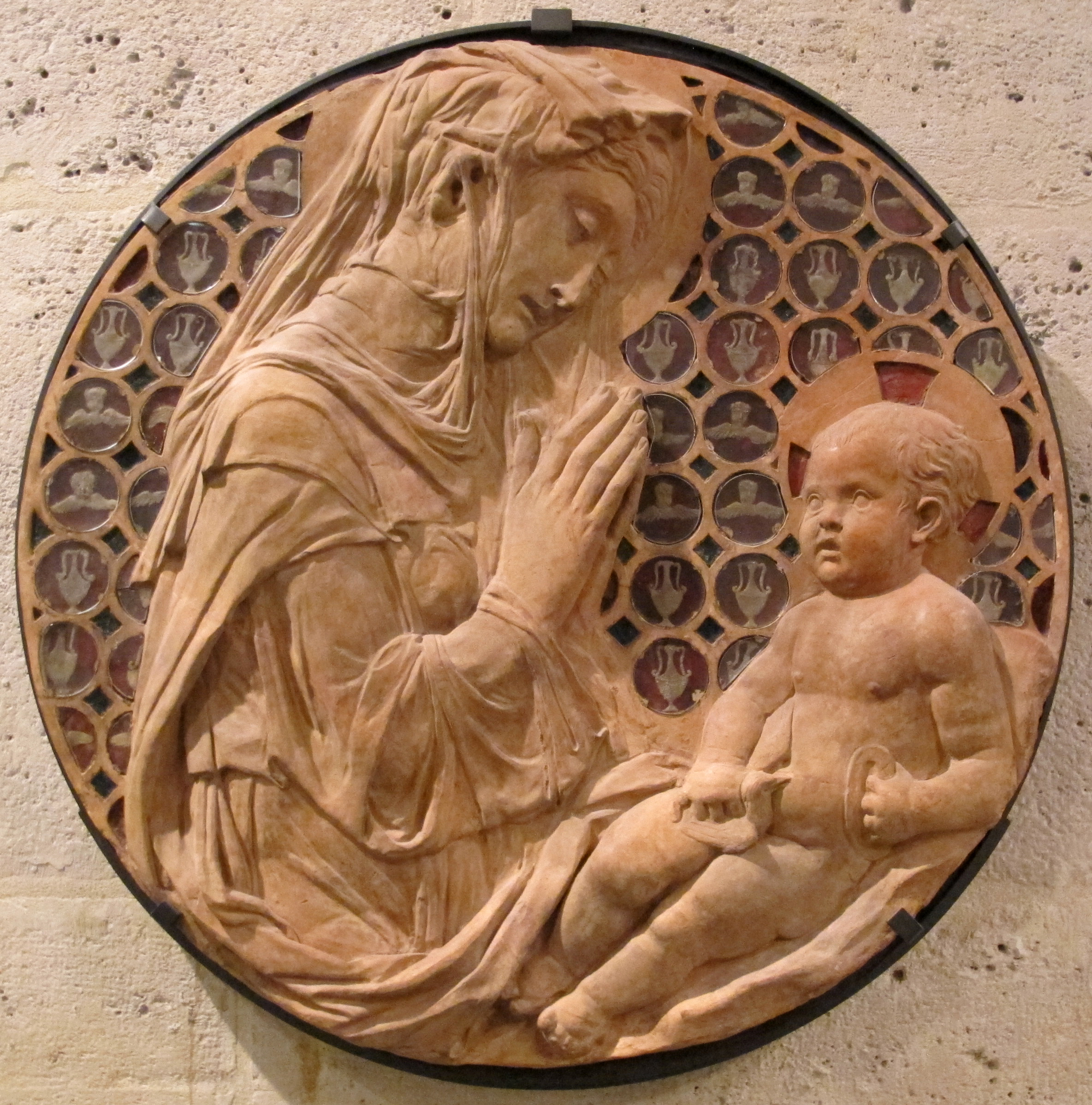
Donatello, "Piot Madonna", terracotta, with medallions of coloured wax under glass and traces of gilding, c. 1440.

Stucco, sometimes painted to imitate bronze, was used, mostly to decorate buildings, and workshops sold small plaster replicas of famous sculptures, not many of which have survived. Temporary sculptures in a wide range of quick and cheap materials such as papier-mache and glue-stiffened cloth were produced in lavish quantities as decorations for parades during festivals and celebrations such as weddings; in the 16th century these are often recorded in prints. One relief panel by Jacopo Sansovino for the decorations for the triumphal entry (a medieval and Renaissance set-piece of pageantry) of Pope Leo X into Florence has survived, despite being in clay and "linen stiffened with size", all mounted on wooden boards; it is a work of the highest artistic quality. Jacopo della Quercia (d. 1438) made an equestrian tomb monument for a church in Siena using "wood, oakum and tow", which unsurprisingly has not survived.

A new and distinctive genre of temporary sculpture for grand festivities was the sugar sculpture. Sugar became regularly imported to Europe in the mid-15th century, when Madeira and the Canary Islands were settled from Europe, and sugar grown there, which was mostly imported through Italy. After this an "all-consuming passion for sugar ... swept through society" as it became far more easily available, though initially still very expensive. Genoa, one of the centres of distribution, became known for candied fruit, while Venice specialized in pastries, sweets (candies), and sugar sculptures. Sugar was then considered medically beneficial.

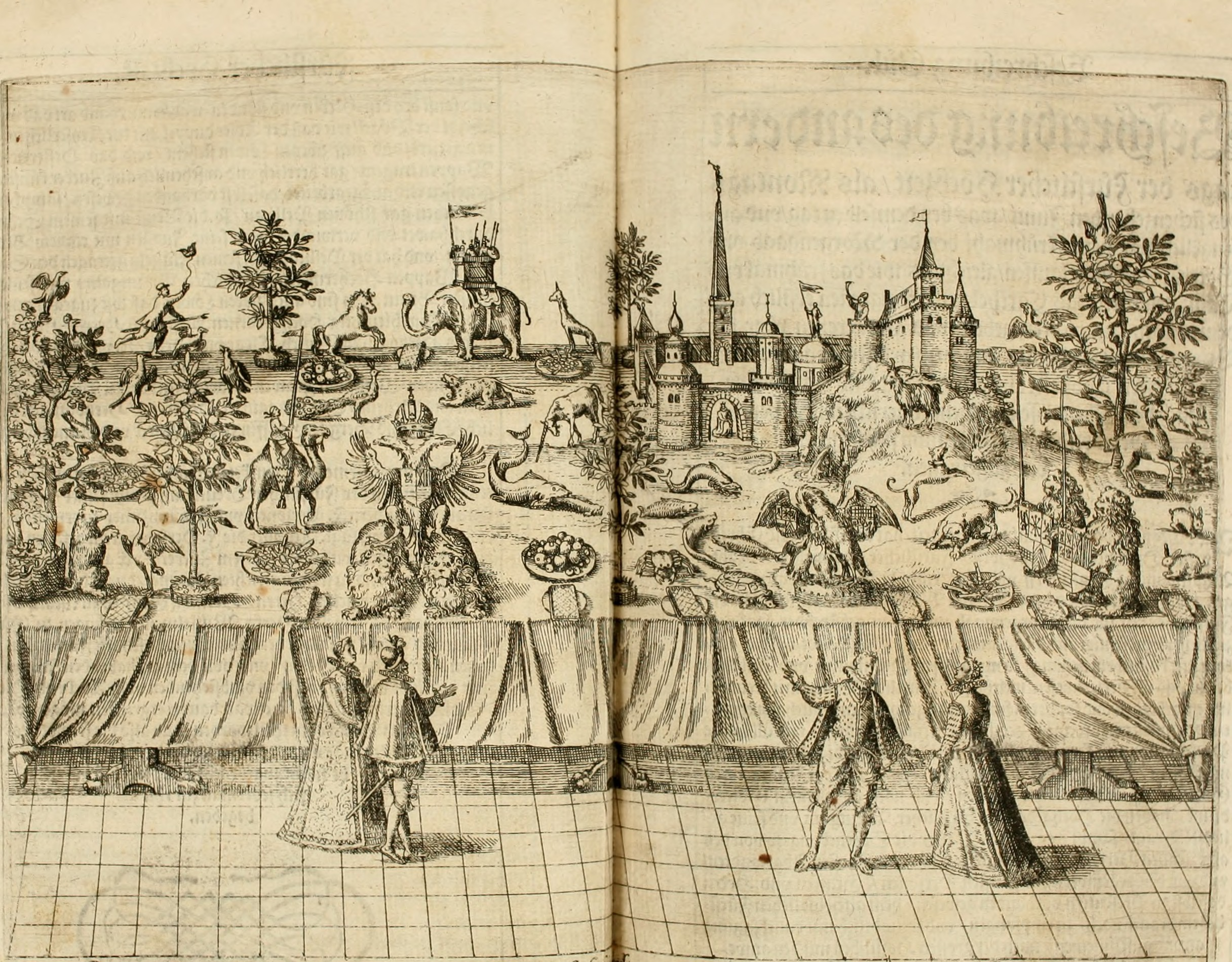
Table set with sugar sculptures for a German princely wedding in 1587.

A feast given in Tours in 1457 by Gaston de Foix includes the first detailed mention of sugar sculptures, as the final food brought in was "a heraldic menagerie sculpted in sugar: lions, stags, monkeys ... each holding in paw or beak the arms of the Hungarian king" (the feast was to honour a Hungarian embassy). Other recorded grand feasts such as wedding banquets in the decades following included similar pieces. Both the wedding of Ercole I d'Este, Duke of Ferrara in 1473 and that of his daughter Isabella d'Este in 1491 concluded with processions carrying in sculptures. In 1491, 103 men carried in "tigers, unicorns, bucentaurs, foxes, wolves, lions ... mountains, dromedaries, ...castles, saracens ... Hercules killing the dragon..." apparently customized for each guest; "sculptors from Mantua, Padua and Venice were brought in to make them from designs by court painters".

Originally some sculptures seem to have been eaten in the meal, but later they become merely table decorations, the most elaborate called triomfi. Several significant sculptors are known to have produced them; in some cases their preliminary drawings survive. Early ones were in brown sugar, partly cast in moulds, with the final touches carved; then gilding or paint might be added. Eventually, in the 18th century, the porcelain figurine evolved as a permanent form of imitation of sugar sculptures; initially these were also placed around dining tables.

=== Coloured sculpture ===
Painting, often now removed after it became flaky, was common if not usual on wood and terracotta, but already unusual on stone and metal in the 15th century. When it was used on these materials it was generally discreet. Some of the marble portrait busts by Lariana retain their polychrome finish; others either never had it, or have had it removed. After 1500 colour fell increasingly from fashion; excavated classical sculptures did not have it, though whether they were originally coloured is another question. The influence of Michelangelo, "who abjured surface attractions in order to convey an idea by form alone" was another factor.

== Settings ==
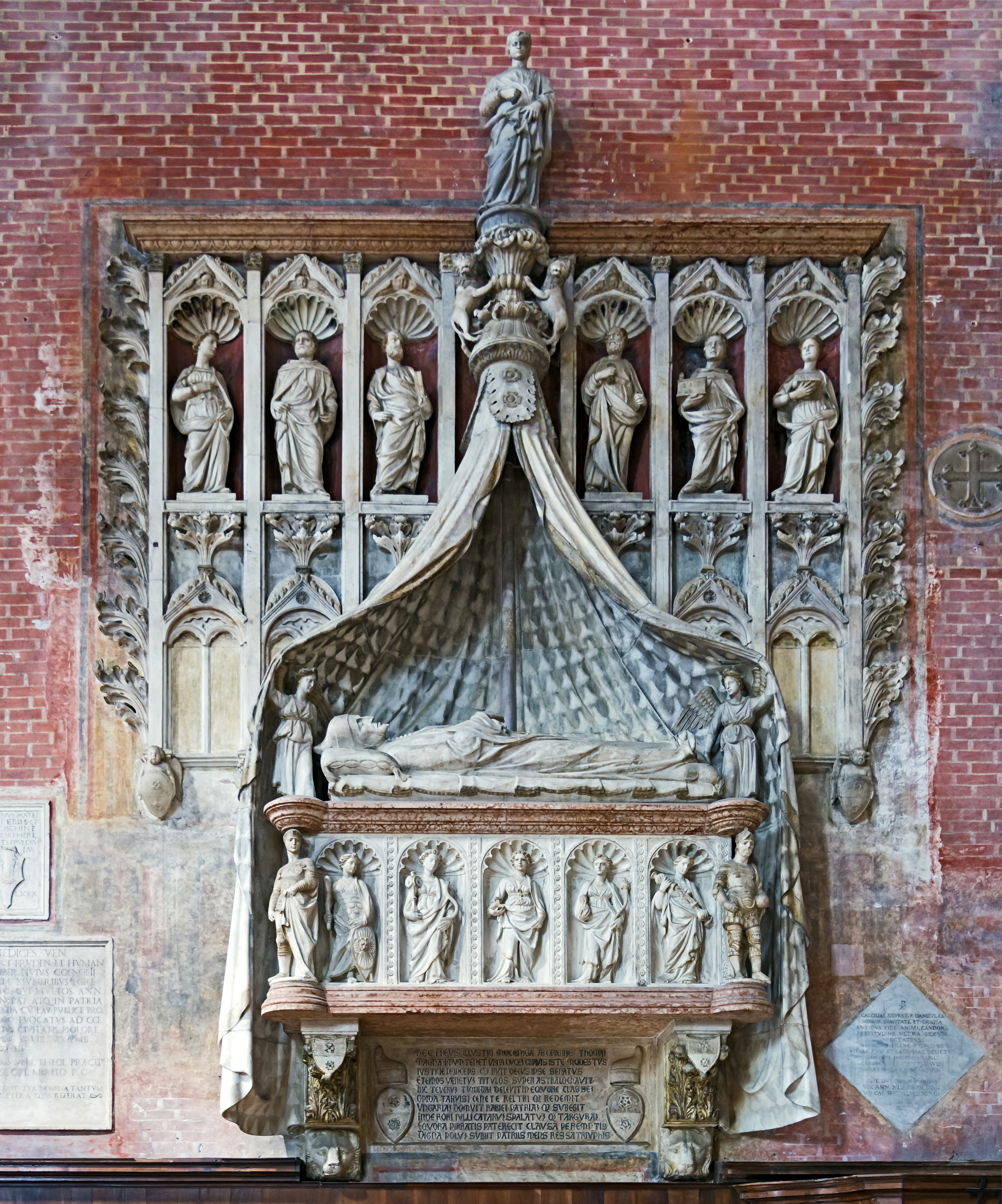
Tomb of Doge Tommaso Mocenigo, d. 1423, Santi Giovanni e Paolo, Venice, by Piero di Niccolò Lamberti (1393–1435) and Giovanni di Martino da Fiesole.

=== Churches and tombs ===
In Italy, sculpture in churches had always been very largely inside the building, in contrast to countries north of the Alps. A rare Italian exception was Milan Cathedral, built from 1368 with large numbers of niches and pinnacles for hundreds of statues, which took the whole period to fill; most were too high for the sculpture to be seen very clearly. Another exception was the nearby Certosa di Pavia, a monastery planned as the dynastic burial place of the Visconti dukes of Milan, emulating other such sites north of the Alps, begun in 1396 but not finished until well over a century later.

In Florence Cathedral the sculptures on the main facade around the "Porta della Mandorla", named for the almond-shaped mandorla or auriole around the Virgin Mary in Nanni di Banco's high relief tympanum (in place by 1422), have a complicated history, involving numerous sculptors and styles. There were three campaigns, each lasting several years, between 1391 and 1422, and several changes after that, including a large 19th-century expansion of sculpture to the higher levels. A small relief of a nude Hercules (representing the virtue of Fortitude) amid ornamental foliage on the side of the doorway "has long been known as a milestone for the study of the nude in the Early Renaissance"; the sculptor is uncertain. Both Donatello's first marble and Michelangelo's figures of David were originally intended for the roofline of the cathedral, but the former was realized to be too small to see properly, hence the large size of the latter, but this in turn was recognized when finished as too heavy for the position, and joined the Donatello in the Piazza della Signoria.

Inside churches, the tomb monuments of the rich grew ever larger, initially with large but fairly shallow frames around the effigy of the deceased, as in the Tomb of Antipope John XXIII in Florence, then in the 16th century sometimes expanding into very large groups of sculptures, culminating in Michelangelo's Tomb of Pope Julius II, worked on between 1505 and 1545, but only partly realized. The new Saint Peter's Basilica began to fill up with large papal tombs, a trend which only increased in the following Baroque period. In Venice, Santi Giovanni e Paolo, Venice has the tombs of 25 Doges, and in the Republic of Florence the Santa Croce church "became ultimately a Florentine kind of Westminster Abbey", with large tombs for leading figures, including Michelangelo and Galileo, made largely at government expense.

Initially figures of the deceased on tombs followed the usual (but not invariable) traditional pattern of a "recumbent effigy", lying with eyes closed, but towards the end of the 15th century they began to be shown as alive. In the case of the popes, the first was the tomb of Pope Innocent VIII (d. 1492), where Antonio del Pollaiuolo had both a recumbent effigy below and a seated figure with an arm raised in blessing above. That is how the monument now appears, after it was moved to St Peter's, but originally these positions were reversed. The next to include any figure was Michelangelo's Tomb of Pope Julius II, begun in 1505 during his lifetime. This had the pope lying on his side with his head raised. From the tomb of Pope Leo X (d. 1521) onwards, seated figures became usual when any figure was included.

=== Civic pride ===
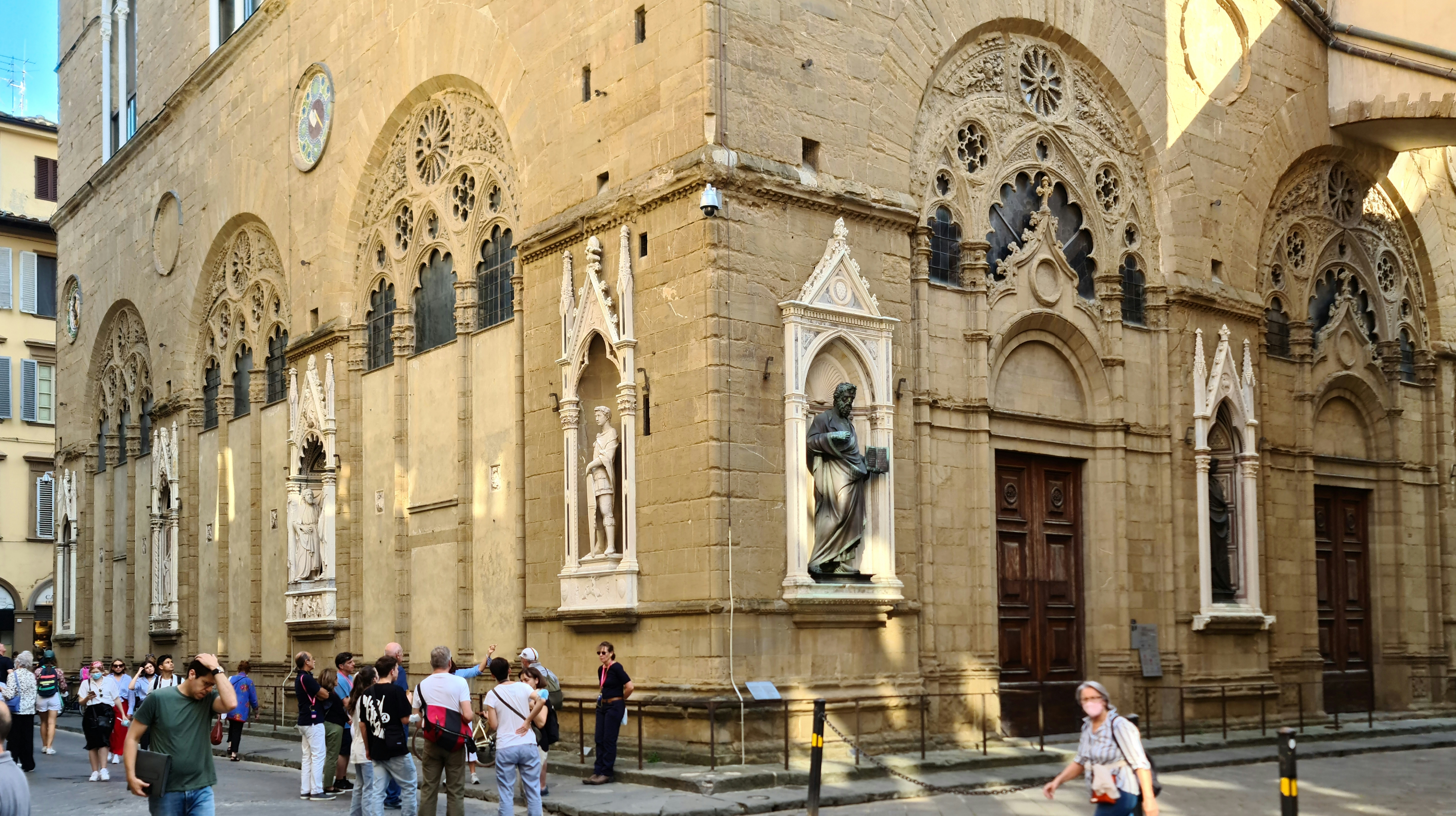
Orsanmichele, Florence; replicas are now in the niches outside, with the originals inside

Cities wanted to boost their prestige through having famous sculptural ensembles in public places, and were often prepared to spend lavishly to achieve this. The most outstanding was undoubtedly the group of unrelated statues in the Piazza della Signoria in the centre of Florence, in front of the Palazzo Vecchio, seat of the government of the republic. The Loggia dei Lanzi is an open arcade on the piazza which built up a collection of outstanding statues, mostly in the 16th century, when Perseus with the Head of Medusa by Benvenuto Cellini and the Rape of the Sabine Women by Giambologna joined the group.

Another Florentine civic showpiece of sculpture was the Orsanmichele, a building the guilds owned together, and used for various purposes. The interior had been given a large tabernacle by Orcagna, probably as a votive offering for the end of the Black Death in the 1360s. The ground floor had originally been open, and used as a trading hall and meeting place, but by 1380 the spaces between the outside pilasters had been walled up, and the ground floor was the guilds' church (still with offices above, now these are the museum with the original statues). There was already a plan for each of the guilds to place a statue on a pilaster, but only one had been done by then. At the end of the century the scheme was revived, and the earliest of the statues in place until they were replaced by copies in modern times is dated 1399, the latest 1601. But there was a burst of activity between 1411 and 1429. The height of the niches, on a busy street, was just a few feet above passers-by. The delay was caused by the dilatoriness of the guilds, but has resulted in a series of works, by the leading sculptors of the day, that display excellently the development of the Florentine style, and especially the cross-currents within it in the years before 1430. Most of the statues are of the patron saints of each guild. There are 14 statues or groups, two by Donatello, two by Ghiberti, and the Christ and St Thomas by Verrocchio (completed c. 1480). Ghiberti's Saint John the Baptist (1412) was the earliest of the six in bronze, still very much in the International Gothic style.

==== Fountains ====
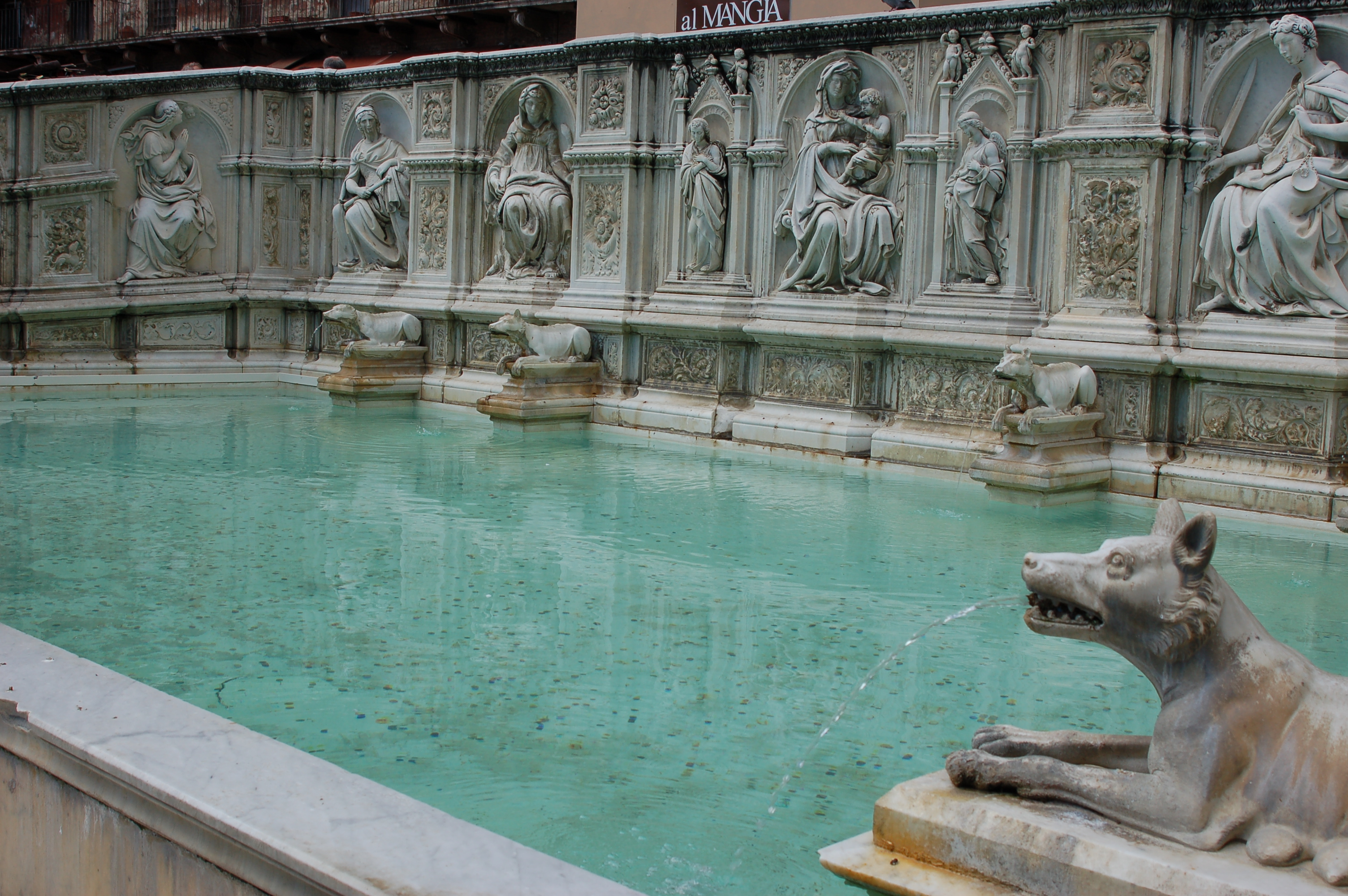
The Fonte Gaia in Siena, Jacopo della Quercia (1419, reliefs now replaced by replicas)

Public fountains, from which the great majority of the population took water for domestic use, were a key part of local administration, on which city governments were judged. Those in main squares had to allow for many people to draw water at once; spouting jets were not expected until the later 16th century, but easy access to a continuous supply of good water was. Some large early fountains were wrapped around with relief panels, like the Proto-Renaissance Fontana Maggiore in Perugia, by Nicolo Pisano and others (mostly 1270s), and the Fonte Gaia in Siena, the present version by Jacopo della Quercia (1419, reliefs now replaced by replicas).

Late Renaissance examples include the Fountain of Neptune, Bologna by Giambologna (1566) and Fountain of Neptune, Florence (Bartolomeo Ammannati and others, completed 1574). These look forward to Baroque fountains; each is surmounted by a large statue of the god. By then the wealthiest private garden fountains were being given sculptural settings almost as extravagant. Giambologna's Samson Slaying a Philistine, now in London, was made for a Medici garden fountain.

=== Portraits ===
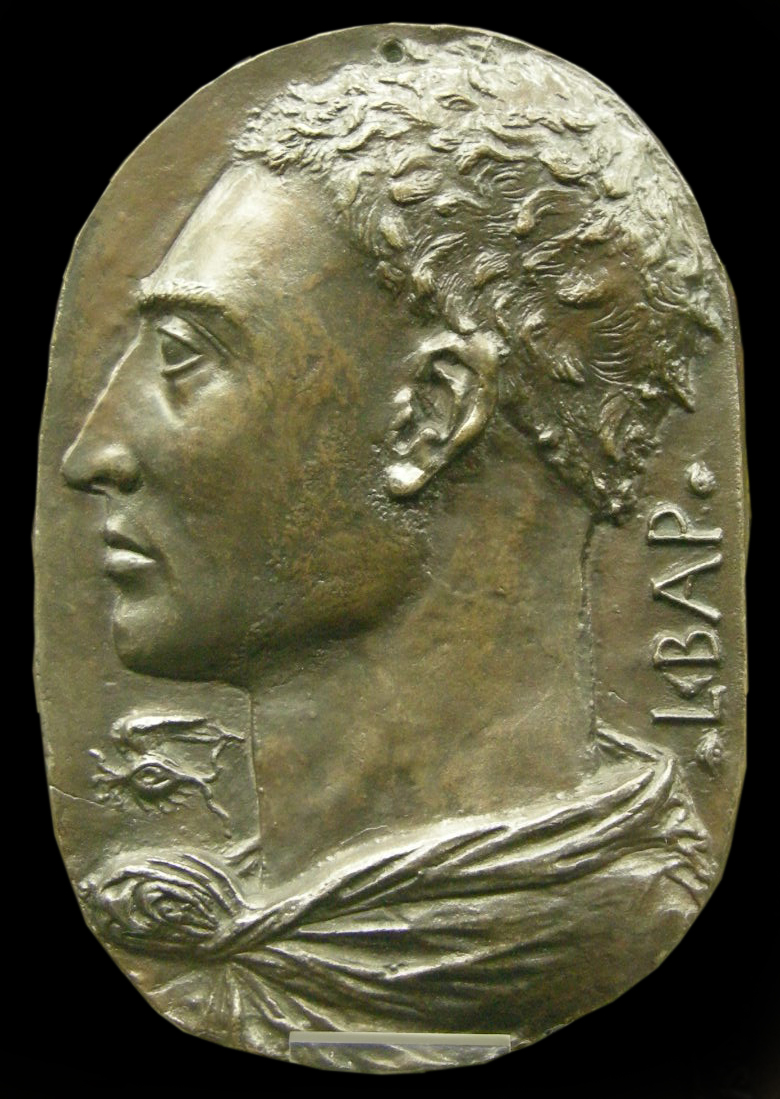
Presumed self-portrait of Leon Battista Alberti, c. 1435

Sculpted portraits had been mostly confined to grave monuments, but during the period they emerged in a wide range of sizes and materials. The Italians became very aware of the Roman attitude that having a public statue of oneself was almost the highest mark of status and reputation, and such statues, preferably mounted on a column, appear frequently in paintings of ideal cities, much more frequently than they ever did in reality. Standing portrait statues of contemporary individuals remained very rare in Italy until the end of the period (one exception is John of Austria in Messina, 1572), but Leone Leoni and his son Pompeo, court artists to the Spanish Habsburgs, made several in bronze for them.

==== Equestrian statues ====
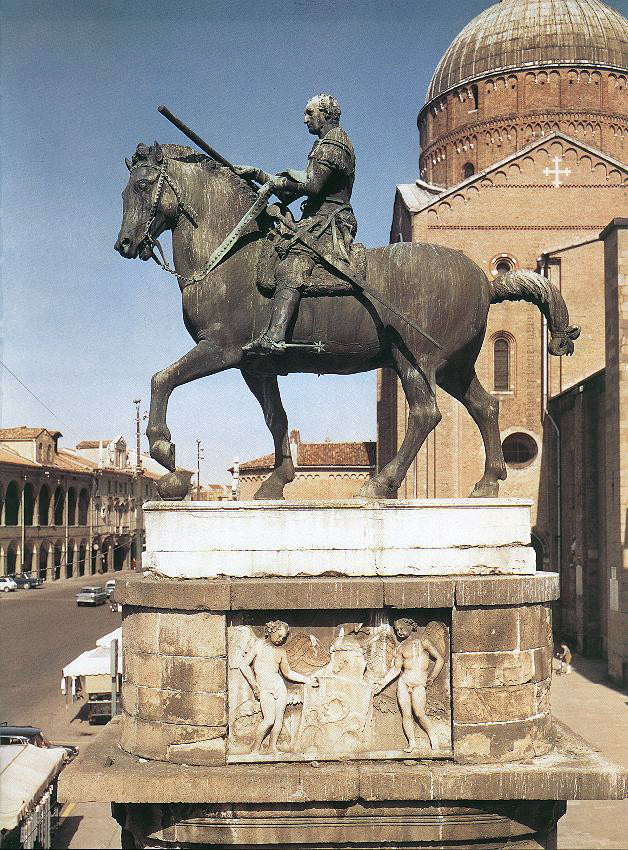
Equestrian statue of Gattamelata in Padua by Donatello (1453)

The ultimate expression of reputation, reserved for rulers and generals, was a full-size equestrian statue; Roman examples survived in the equestrian statue of Marcus Aurelius in Rome and the (now destroyed) Regisole in Pavia. There were stiff Gothic precursors in marble at the Scaliger Tombs in Verona, and one of Bernabò Visconti in Milan by Bonino da Campione (1363). A number of temporary ones were made for festivities, but very few in bronze during the Renaissance. The attraction of the form is shown by two fictive statues painted in fresco in Florence Cathedral: that for Sir John Hawkwood (Paolo Uccello, 1436), is next to that for Niccolò da Tolentino (Andrea del Castagno 1456).

As with the imitations in fresco, both the first two real bronzes were of condottieri (mercenary generals): the equestrian statue of Gattamelata in Padua by Donatello (1453) and the equestrian statue of Bartolomeo Colleoni, started by Andrea del Verrocchio in the 1480s but finished by another after his death. Right at the end of the period, well after the Medici had turned themselves into Grand Dukes of Tuscany, and republican sentiment was thought to have died down sufficiently, Giambologna made two for them, the statue of Cosimo I de' Medici (1598) on the Piazza della Signoria, and by 1608 that of Ferdinando I.

One of the great unfinished projects of the Renaissance was Leonardo da Vinci's Sforza Horse, an over–life-size equestrian portrait of Francesco I Sforza for his son Ludovico il Moro, both Dukes of Milan, originally intended to be rearing up, but when this proved too ambitious, planned with a "walking gait". Leonardo had trained in the workshop of Andrea del Verrocchio, at the time the horse for the Colleoni monument was being made. He was assigned the project in 1489, and by the winter of 1492–93 had completed a full-scale clay model, which was displayed to great acclaim in Milan Cathedral for the wedding of Bianca Maria Sforza and Maximilian I, Holy Roman Emperor. He may have made the mould, or parts of it, but by late 1494 Ludovico decided he needed the large amount of bronze he had assembled for the statue for cannons instead, given the turn taken by the First Italian War, begun that year. When the French finally occupied Milan in 1499, the clay model was badly damaged by French bowmen using it as a target. Only a number of drawings and some small wax models of uncertain authorship survive.

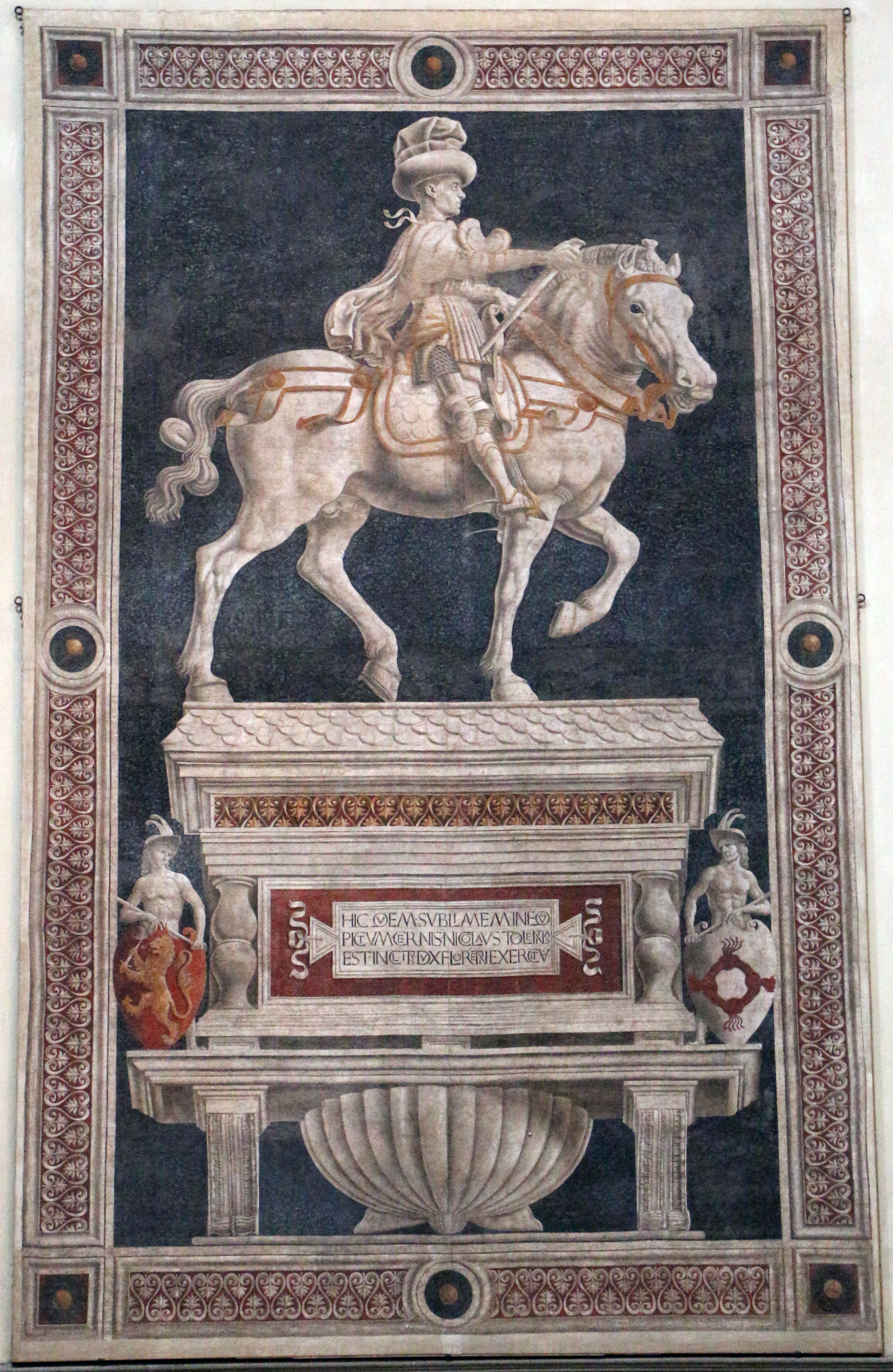
Fresco of Niccolò da Tolentino, Andrea del Castagno 1456

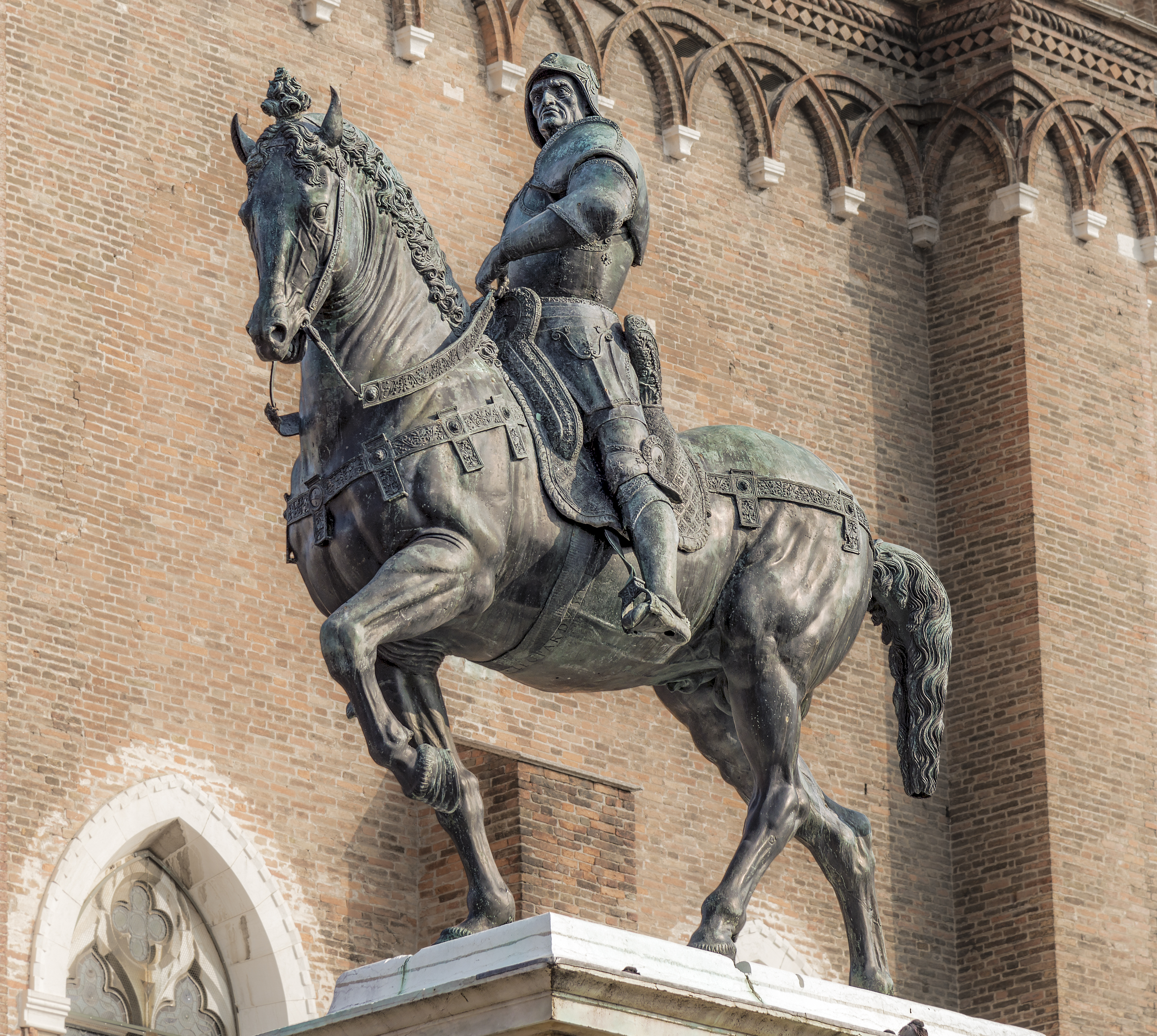
Equestrian statue of Bartolomeo Colleoni, started by Andrea del Verrocchio in the 1480s, Venice

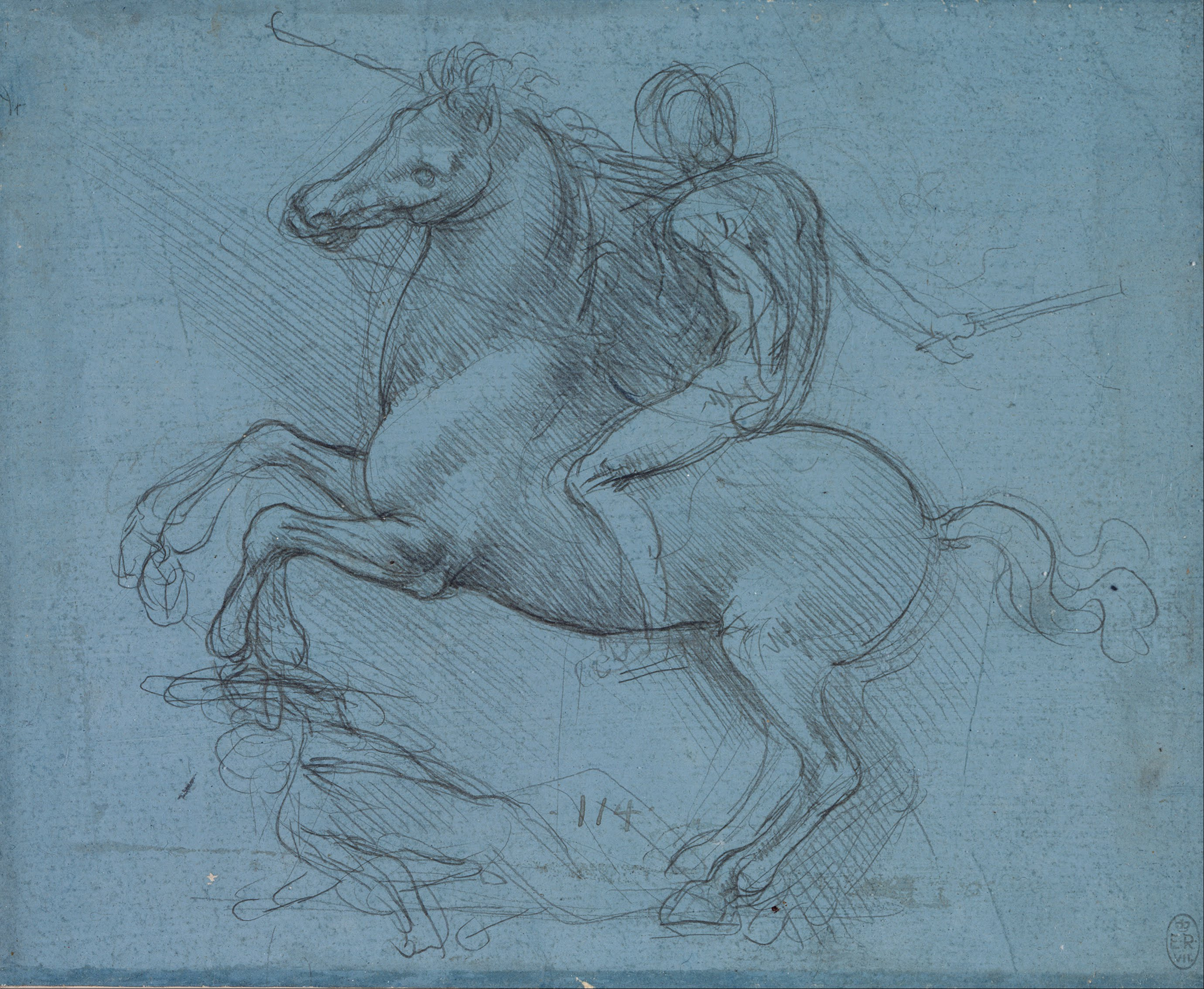
Leonardo da Vinci, Study for the Sforza Horse (first design)

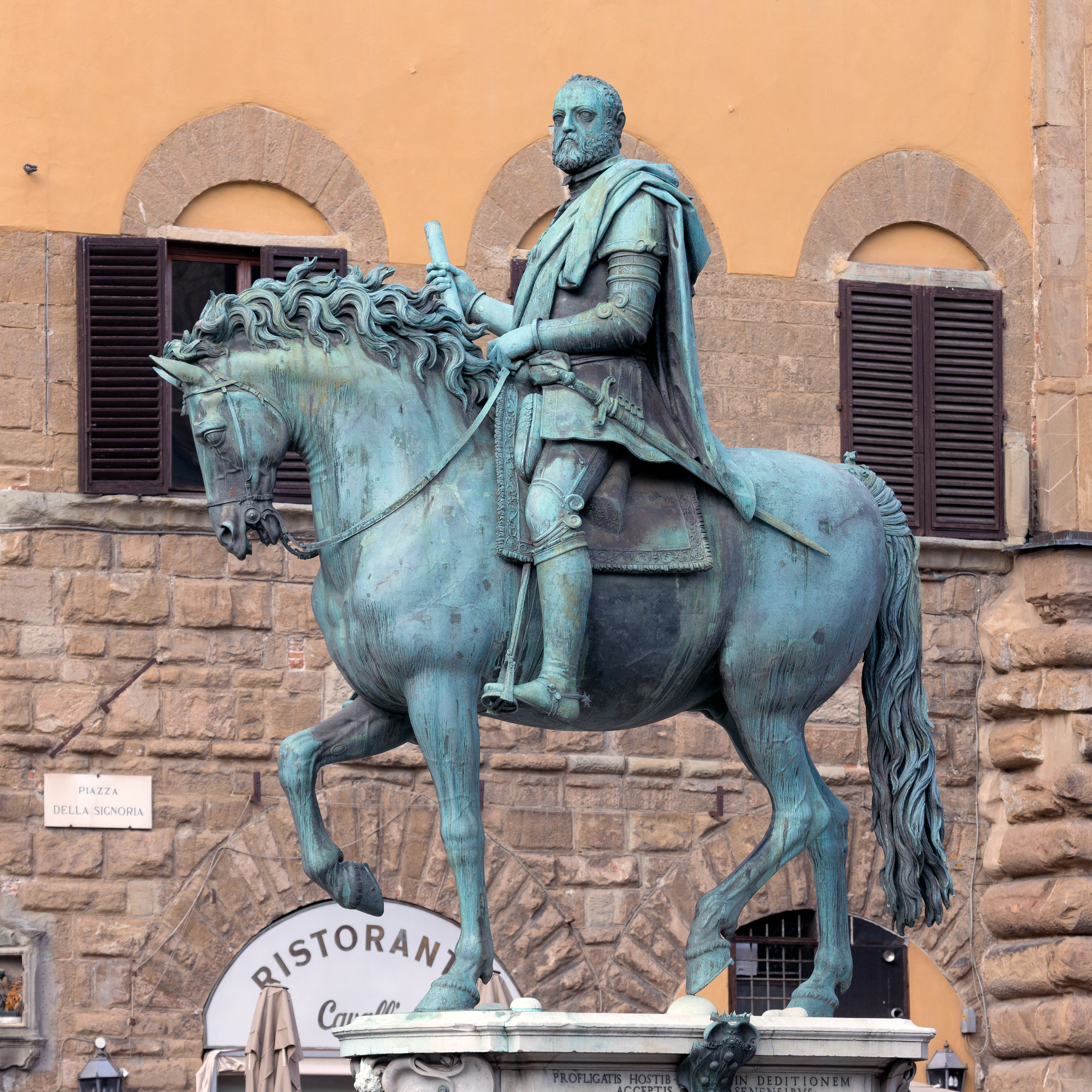
Giambologna, Cosimo I de' Medici, 1598, Piazza della Signoria, Florence

==== Shoulder busts ====
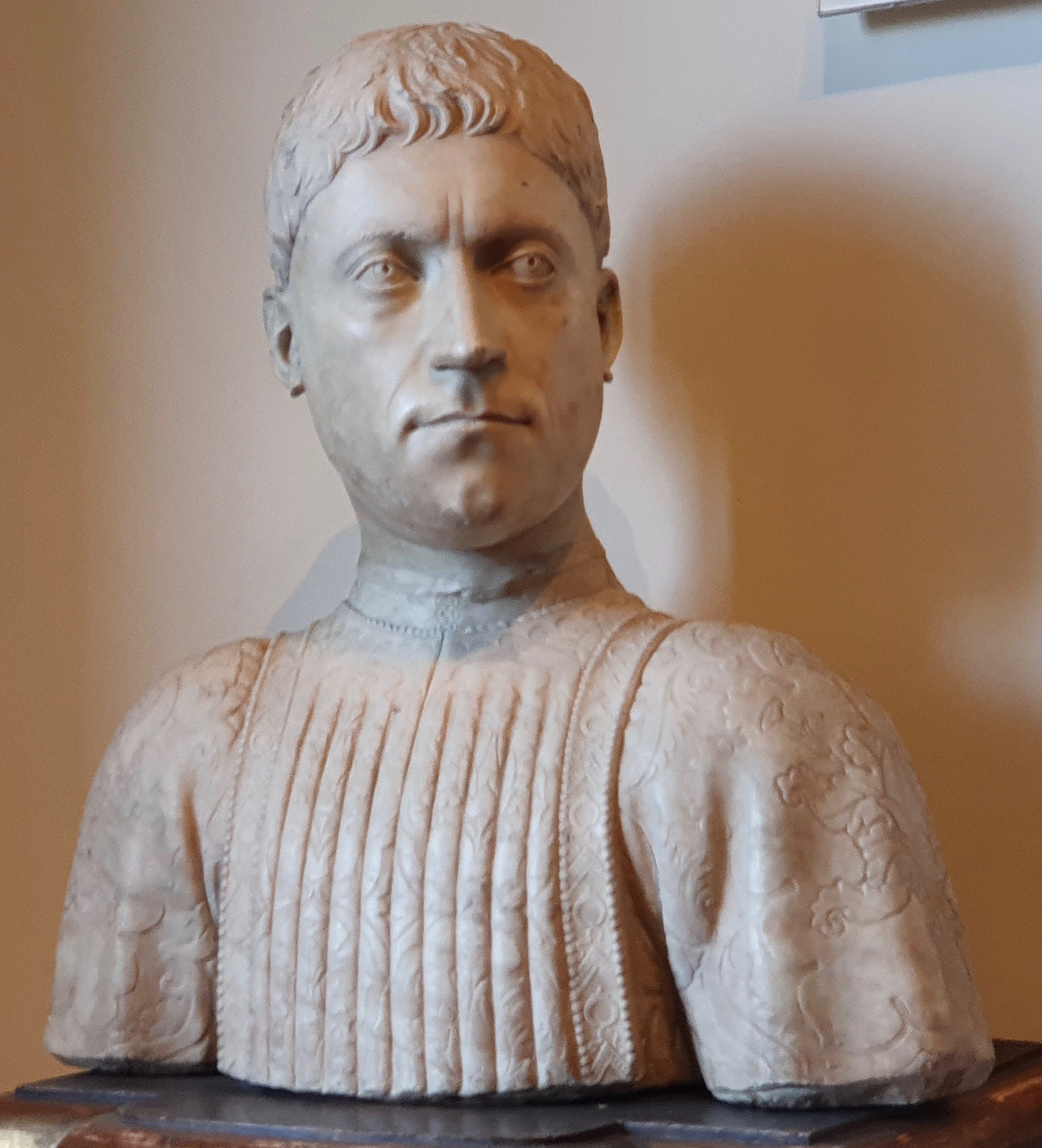
The earliest dated Renaissance portrait bust, 1453, by Mino da Fiesole of Piero de' Medici

A type of bust portrait cut off below the shoulders emerged, apparently for placing in the relatively private settings of the family palazzo. This seems to have been influenced by the shape of some medieval reliquaries and temporary funerary effigies, and perhaps Roman "window" relief tomb portraits like the 1st-century AD Grave relief of Publius Aiedius and Aiedia, a "vernacular" style used for freedmen and the business class. It also showed a similar view to the emerging form of the portrait painting, but at life size and in three dimensions. Donatello also used the format for a bronze saint in the 1420s. The earliest datable portrait example in marble is a bust of 1453 by Mino da Fiesole of Piero di Cosimo de' Medici, which is "stiff and tense, as we might expect of a young sculptor who was asked to do something unfamiliar", especially for the de facto ruler of the Republic of Florence. Vasari says the bust was placed over the door to Piero's rooms in the Palazzo Medici, then still under construction. There was a matching portrait of his wife Lucrezia Tornabuoni, now lost or untraced.

Mino did a number of similar busts, and artists such as Antonio Rossellino and Benedetto da Maiano took up the form, the latter taking a "life mask" mould, probably in wax, to work from. Early subjects included a doctor and an apothecary, as well as the top elite. In one case, the banker Filippo Strozzi the Elder (who also commissioned Benedetto to design the Palazzo Strozzi), both a terracotta model and a more idealized marble bust survive.

Benedetto also used the format in fully polychromed terracotta, which had been used for a bust attributed to Donatello of the politician Niccolò da Uzzano (d. 1431), probably posthumous, made using a death mask. This would make it very early. In the next century, painted terracotta busts were made of Lorenzo de' Medici, probably well after his death. He is shown wearing the rather old-fashioned and middle class cappucchio headgear, as a political statement.

Pietro Torrigiano made a bust of Henry VII of England, probably posthumous from a death mask, and he or Mazzoni one of a cheerful boy assumed to be the future Henry VIII during his stay in England. Francesco Laurana, another widely travelled sculptor, was born in Venetian Dalmatia, but mostly worked in Naples, Sicily, and southern France, with some uncertain periods in his career. In the 1470s, relatively late in his career, he began to produce shoulder busts of rather similar-looking and somewhat idealized ladies in marble, some with polychrome.

By the High Renaissance the flat-bottomed shoulder bust had fallen from favour, and classical-style rounded bottoms sitting on a socle were preferred, as has remained the case.

==== Medals ====
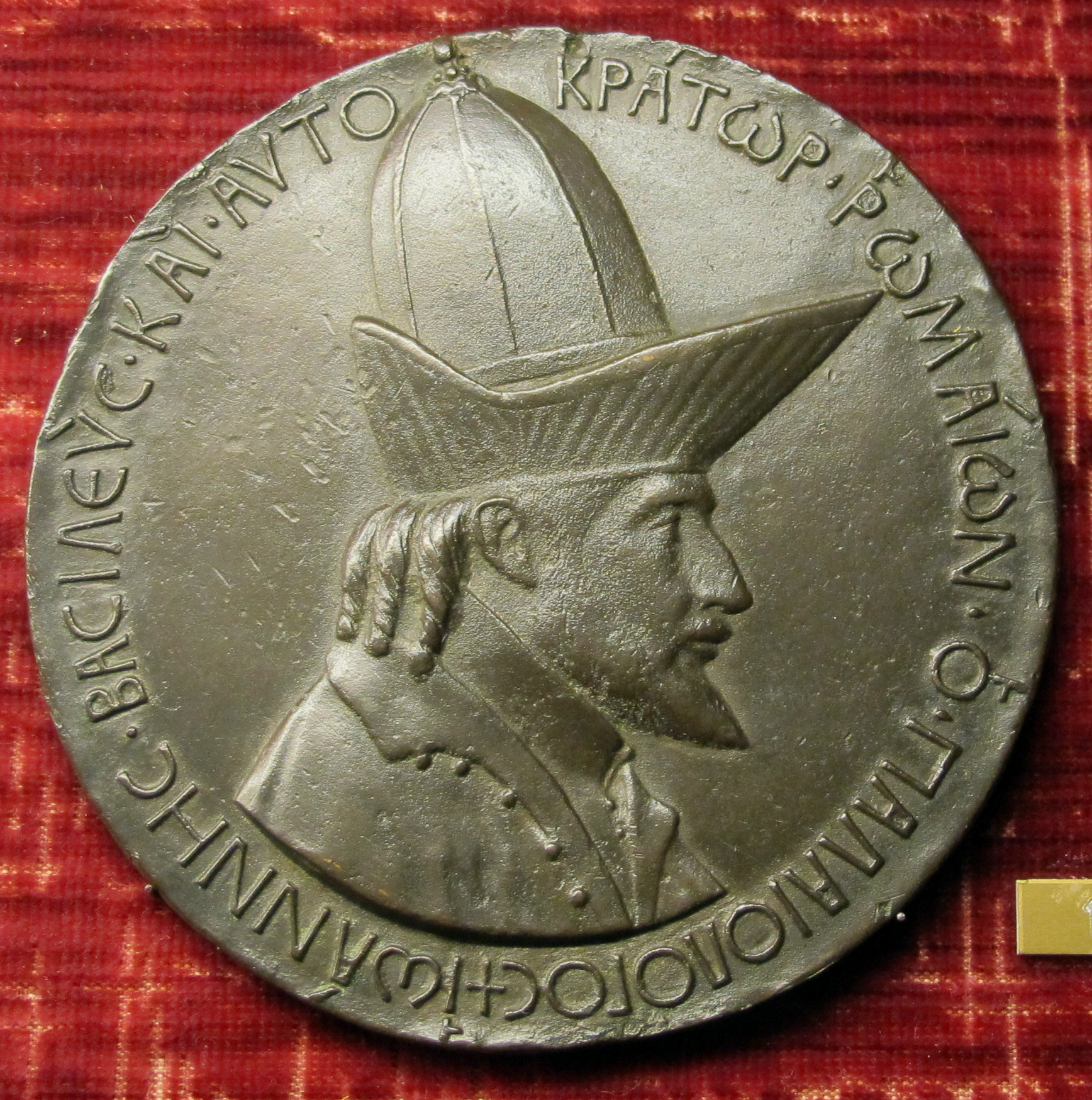
Medal of John VIII Palaeologus, c. 1438, Pisanello

With some precedents a few decades earlier, the Renaissance portrait medal was effectively invented by Pisanello. A leading painter for courts around Italy, these seem to be his only pieces of sculpture. The earliest is probably his Medal of the Byzantine Emperor John VIII Palaeologus, who Pisanello saw when he visited Italy in 1438. In bronze, double-sided, and 10.3 cm (4.1 in) across, this is like a considerably enlarged coin, and set a convention that was normally followed in having a portrait recto, and a different scene on the verso.

It became usual to have the impresa or personal emblem of the subject on the verso, with a motto. These had become essential, not just for rulers, but for anyone with pretensions to be a Renaissance humanist, the groups most likely to commission medals. The mottos became increasingly abstruse puzzles for the recipient to ponder, as a "consciously erudite statement on the sitter's identity". Medals were produced in small editions, and sometimes different metals were used, for recipients of differing status (see above). They were keenly collected for the emerging cabinet of curiousities, and became a useful form of advertising for intellectuals seeking patronage. Pisanello had a medal made of himself by a colleague, and later medallists often did medals with self-portraits.

The greater quality of the modelling on medals raised the bar for the artistic quality of coins, especially the most prestigious gold issues. In medieval Italy (unlike England) it had not been usual to include a portrait of the ruler, but in the Renaissance profile portraits became usual for princely states, reviving the imperial Roman style. The artists are usually unrecorded, but were probably often distinguished; Benvenuto Cellini's autobiography mentions one he modelled for Alessandro de' Medici, Duke of Florence, which is identifiable.

Medals commemorating events rather than individuals mostly came near the end of this period, but one was made immediately for the failure of the Pazzi conspiracy against the Medici in 1478; "its narrative content is unprecedented". The two sides are near mirror images, with the heads of the two Medici brothers, Lorenzo who escaped, and Giuliano who was assassinated. They rise above the choir screen of the cathedral, where the assassins struck during Mass.

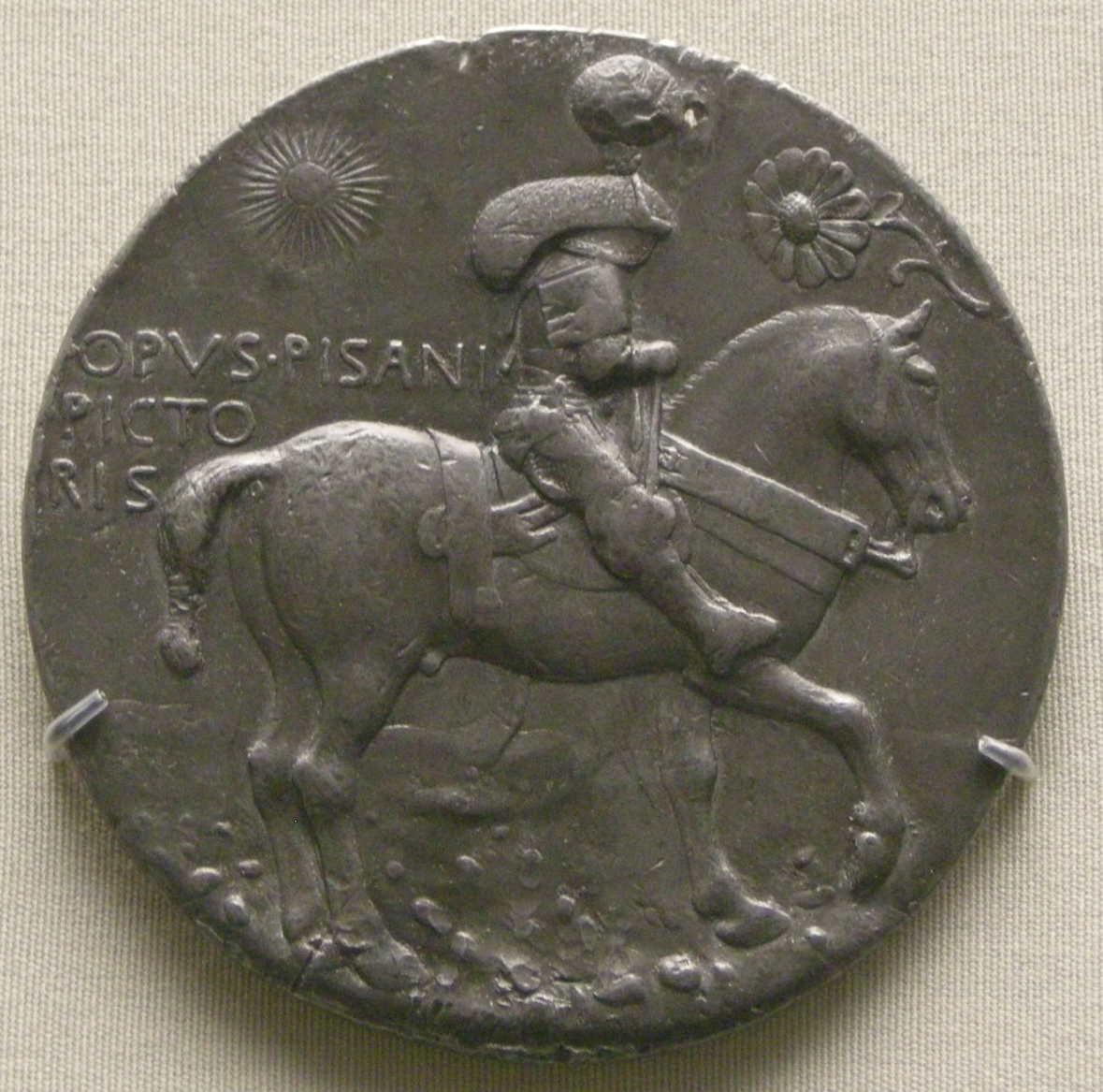
Pisanello, Ludovico Gonzaga, 1447, reverse

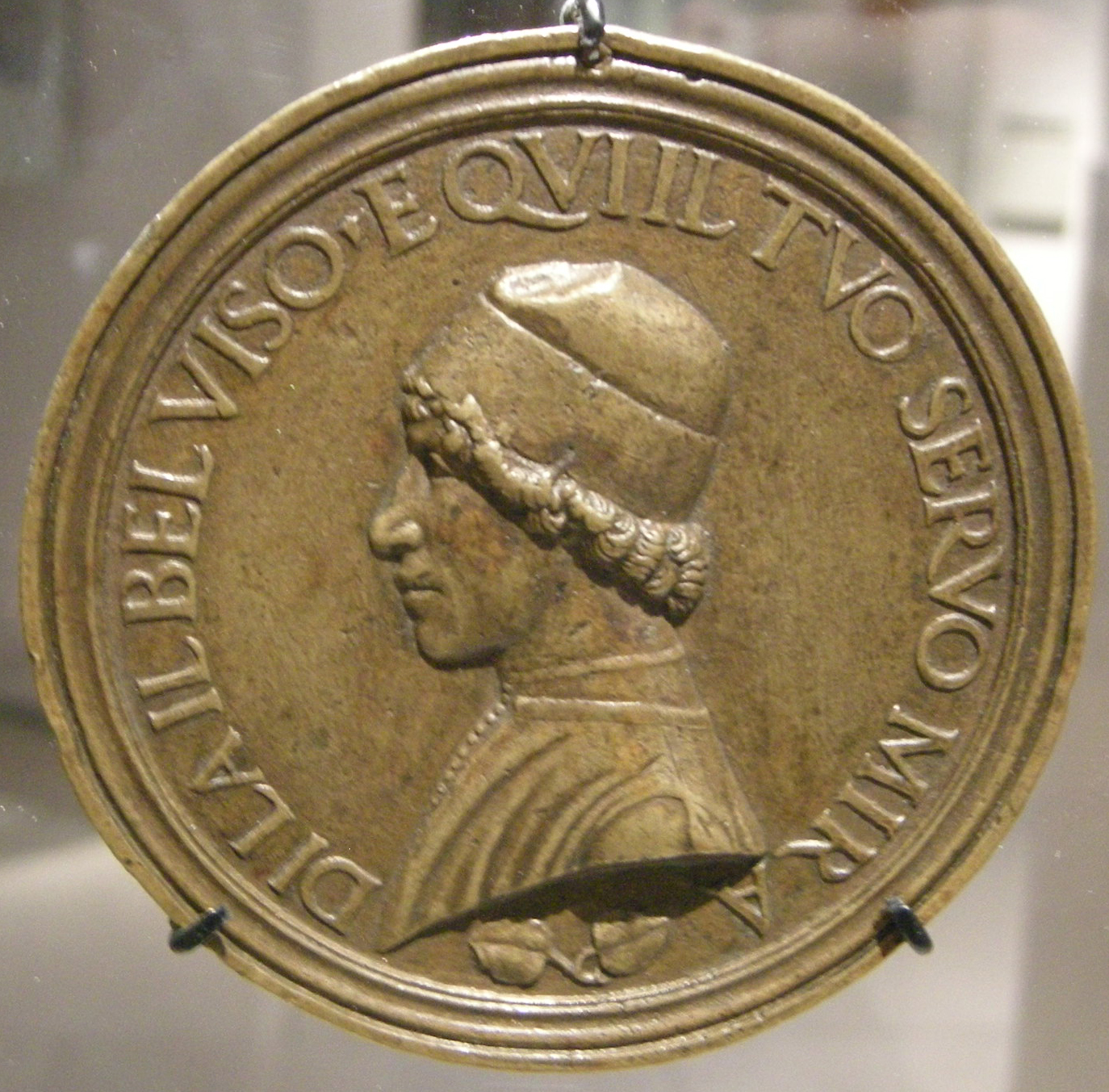
Lisisppo il giovane, self-portrait medal, 1475–80

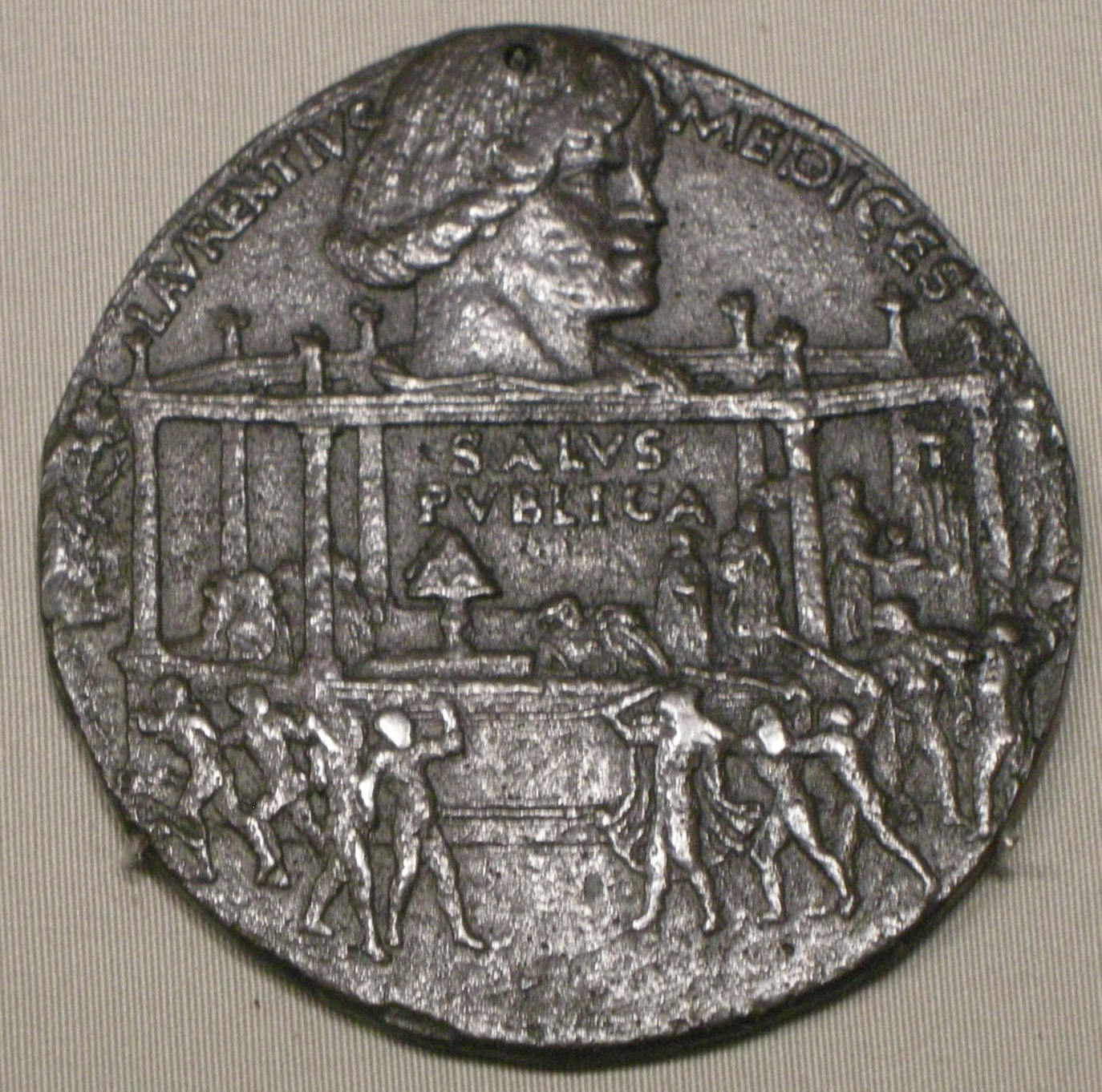
Medal of the Pazzi conspiracy, with Lorenzo, 1478, Bertoldo di Giovanni

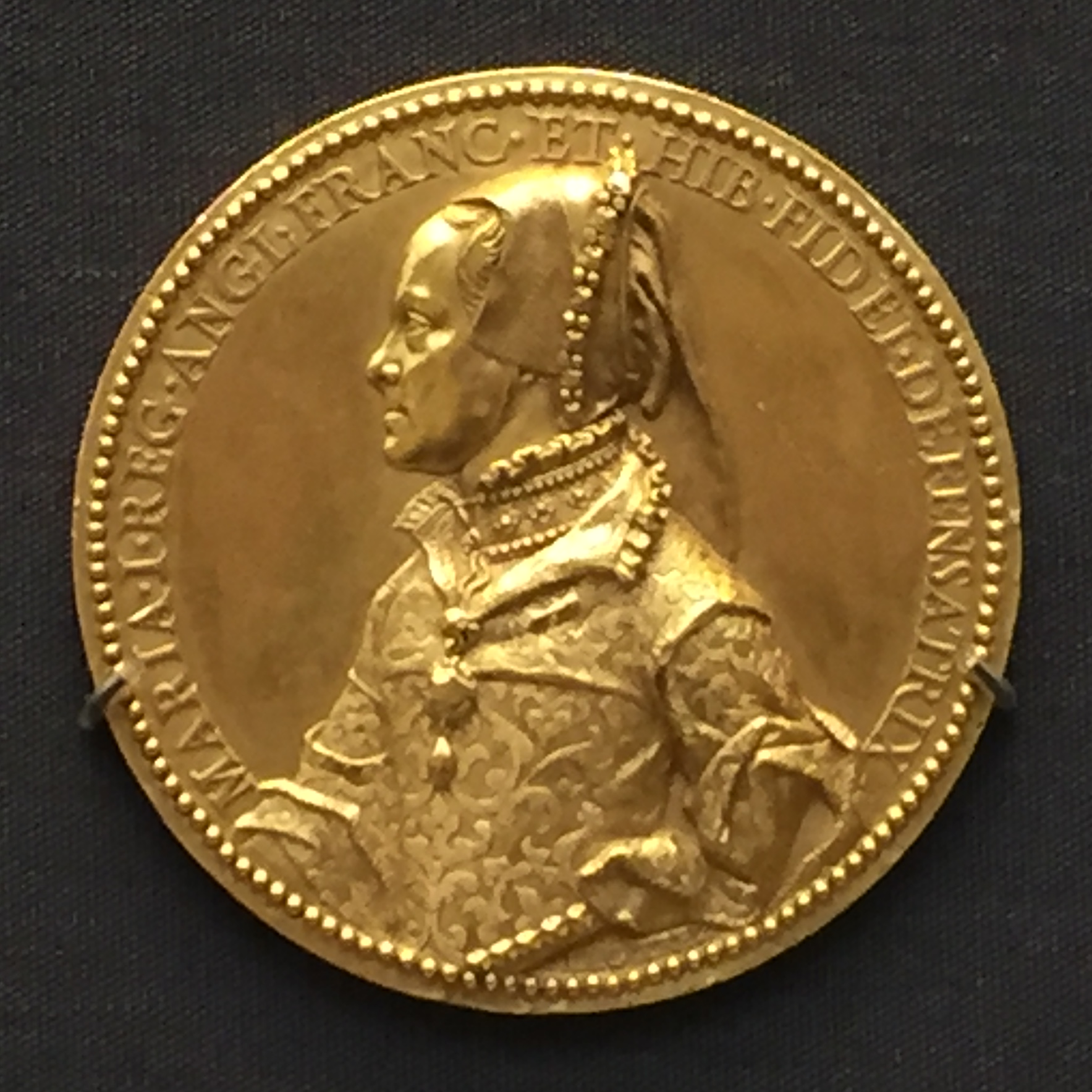
Gold medal of Queen Mary I of England, 1554, Jacopo da Trezzo

=== Small sculpture ===
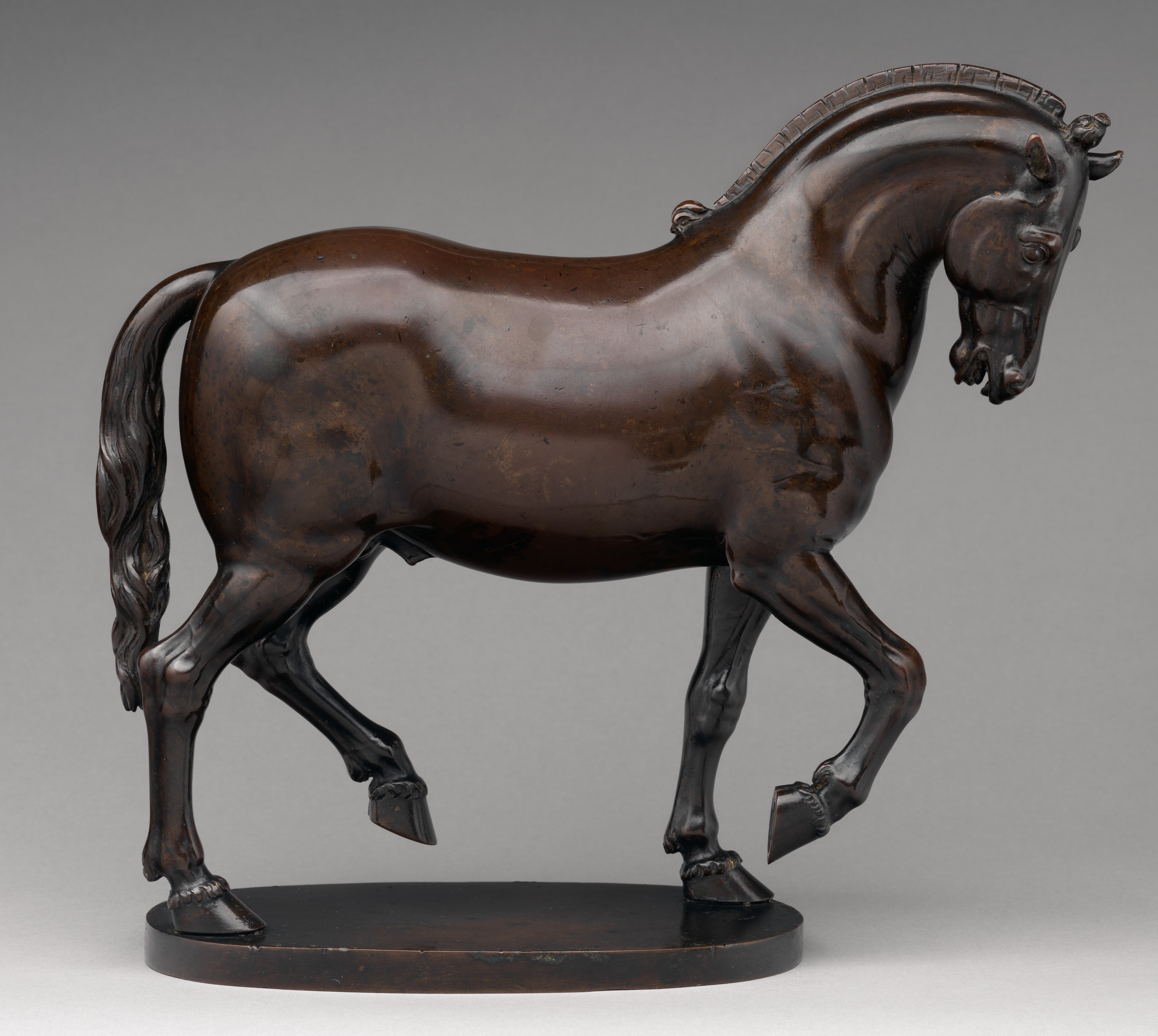
Horse by Giambologna (workshop), probably around 1590. 10 inches (25 cm) high.

Bronze statuettes were very rare in the Middle Ages, virtually restricted to royalty, but from about 1450 became increasingly popular, for a wealthy collector's market. Collectors of secular ones were mostly male and the subjects reflect male tastes. Horses were extremely popular, with warriors, mythological figures or personifications also common; nudity in both sexes became more common over the 16th century. Especially in the 16th century, the subjects for these works were probably chosen by the sculptor to produce for sale, rather than being commissioned like the vast majority of larger sculpture. However, market taste must have been a consideration.

Many were reduced versions of larger compositions. They were intended to be appreciated by holding and turning in the hands by collectors and their friends, when the best "give an aesthetic stimulus of that involuntary kind that sometimes comes from listening to music", says John Shearman, talking of Giambologna's small figures. Now most are in museums this kind of appreciation is hardly ever possible, and "reversals of taste" have made these "supremely artificial" objects not widely popular.

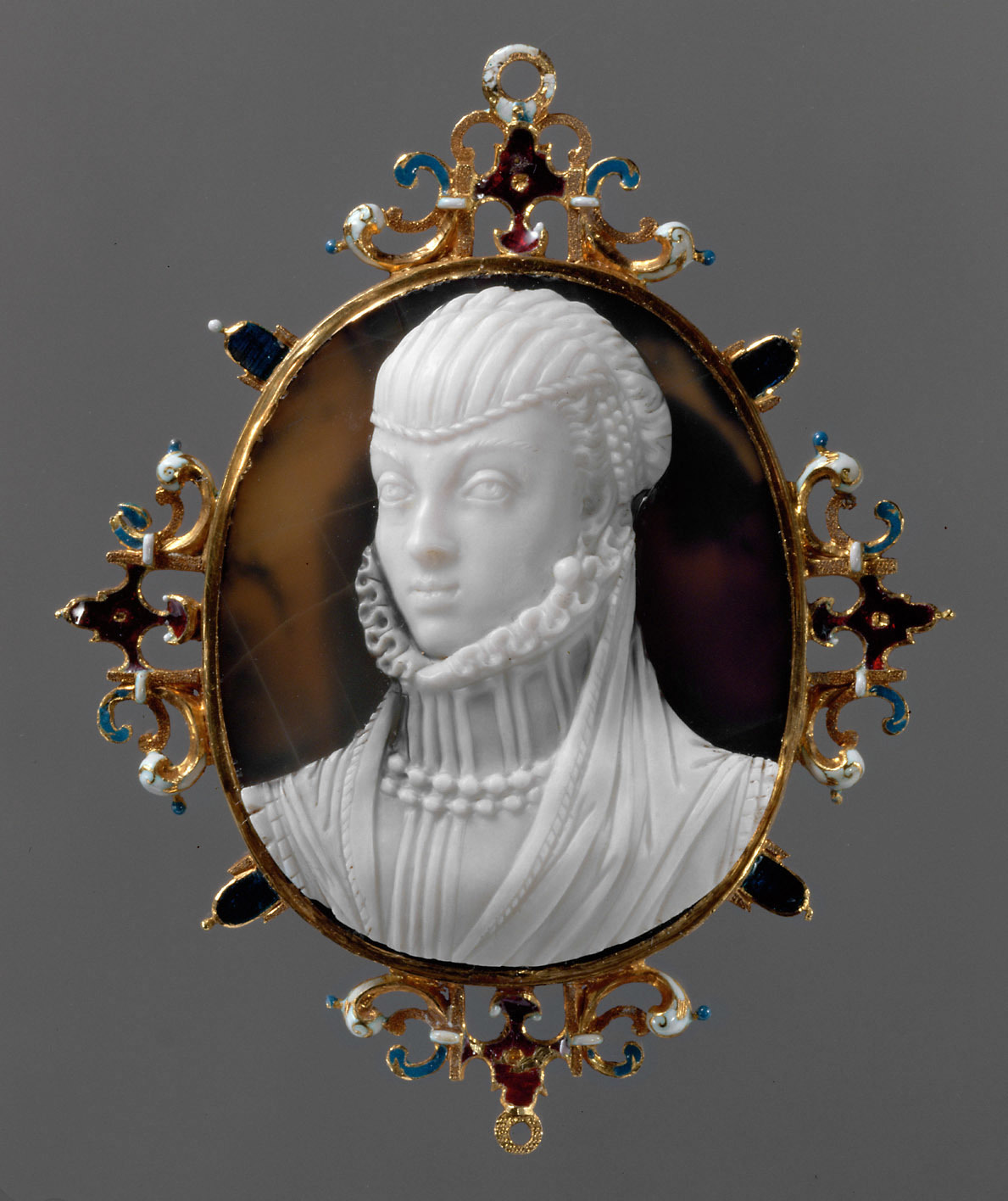
Cameo of Joanna of Austria, Princess of Portugal and Regent of Spain, 1566, Jacopo da Trezzo, a Milanese who died in Madrid.

The subjects on plaquettes were also presumably the artists' choices. Though very small, they allowed the sort of complicated multi-figure action compositions that commissions rarely required, and that artists who had seen late-Roman sarcophagi were attracted to. Both statuettes and plaquettes were generally produced in small editions of several copies, and some plaquettes were made in a series, showing different episodes from a story. Many were shaped to be used as mounts for sword hilts and other items, and some borrowed their compositions from prints. Some major artists, or their workshops, made plaquettes, but many artists seem not to have been involved in larger sculpture.

In these genres, Florence was not dominant as it was for larger sculpture, and Padua was around 1500 the largest centre, having had a strong bronze-casting tradition since Donatello's years there. Leading Paduan artists included Donatello's pupil Bartolommeo Bellano and his pupil Andrea Riccio. Pier Jacopo Alari Bonacolsi, known as "Antico", was based in Mantua, producing mostly elegant classicizing figures, often with gilded highlights, for the Gonzaga family.

The engraved gem, a small form of hardstone carving, had been a popular object to collect for ancient Romans, including Julius Caesar, and a number of ancient examples had been incorporated into medieval jewelled objects such as the Cross of Lothair. In particular, imperial portrait cameos like the Gemma Augustea had tremendous prestige, and Renaissance elites were very keen to have their own likenesses in the form. Some plaquettes copy, or even are cast from, antique engraved gems, especially from the Medici collection.

In the 16th century Venetian sculptors "developed a genre of grandly scaled household objects in bronze" for the patricians' palaces and villas, often including figures amongst the rich decoration. These included candlesticks, door-knockers and andirons. The workshops of Andrea Riccio and later Girolamo Campagna were prominent in this area, but the makers of many objects are unclear.

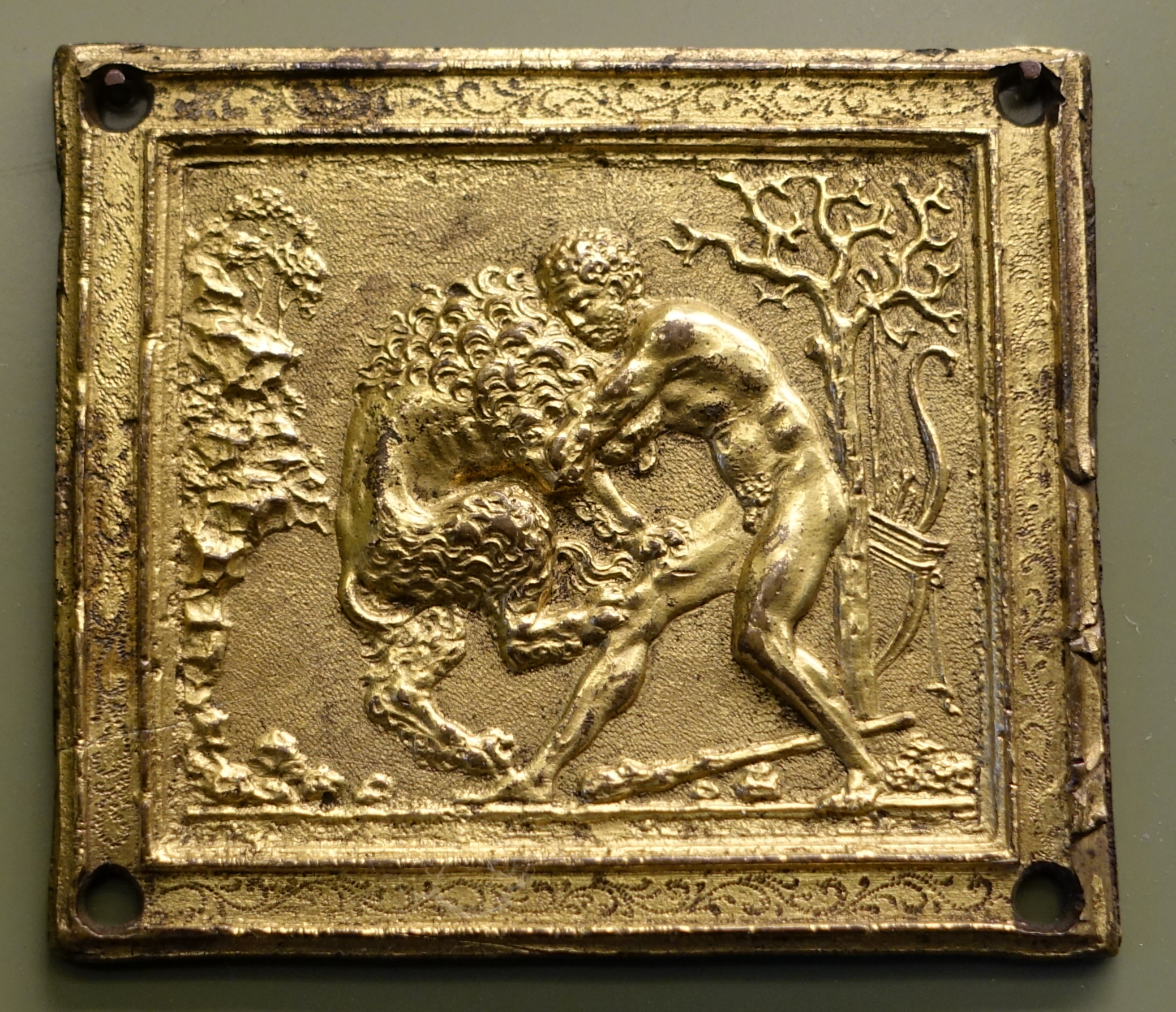
Hercules and the Nemean Lion, Galeazzo Mondella (Moderno), c. 1500, gilt bronze plaquette

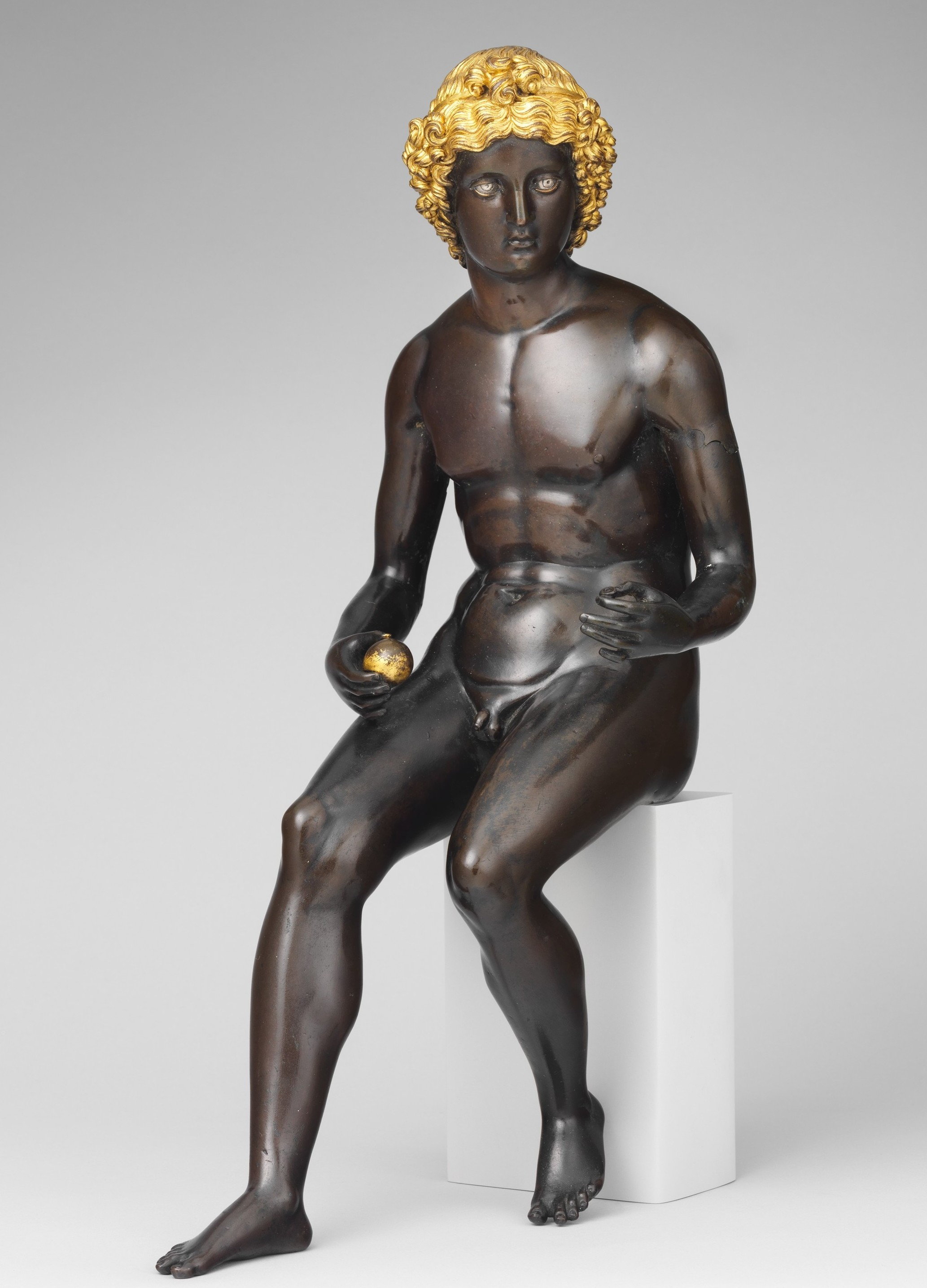
Paris with his apple, statuette by Antico, c. 1500–05, 14 5/8 inches (37 cm) high

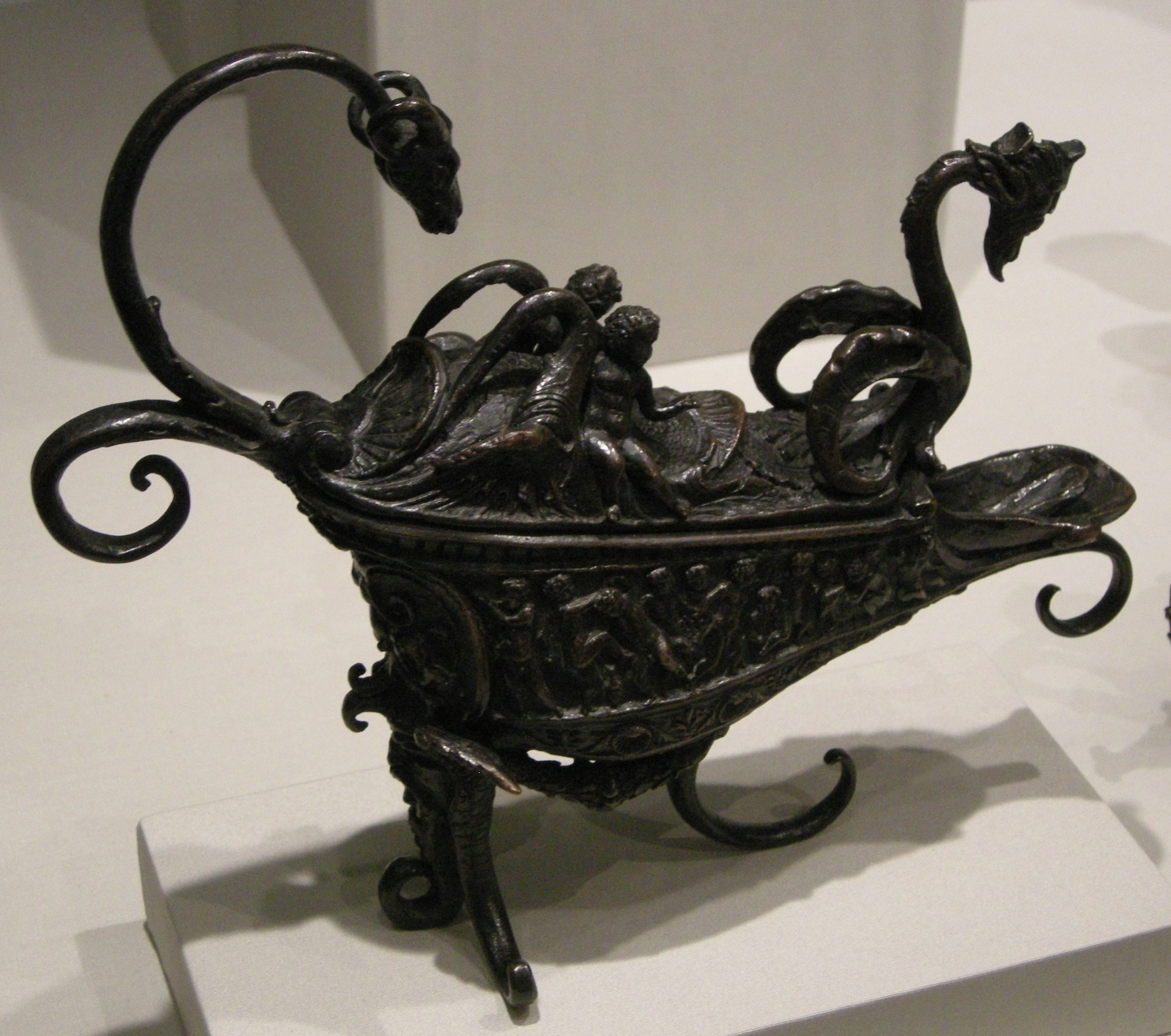
Andrea Riccio, oil-lamp with putti, Padua, 1515–25

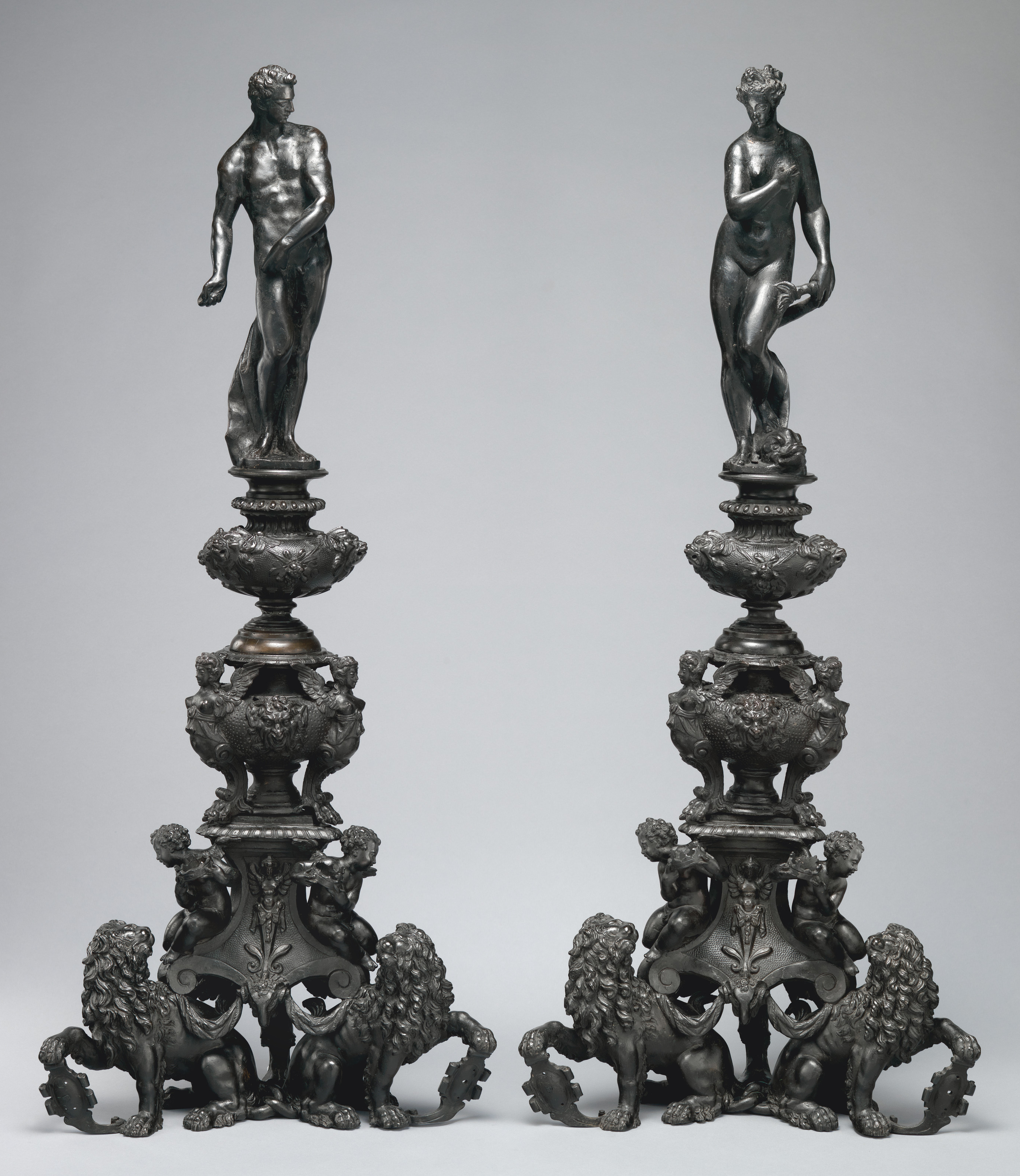
Andiron fronts with Venus and (?) Mars. Design by Girolamo Campagna, possibly made in 17th century. 44 1/2 inches (113 cm) high

== Workshops ==
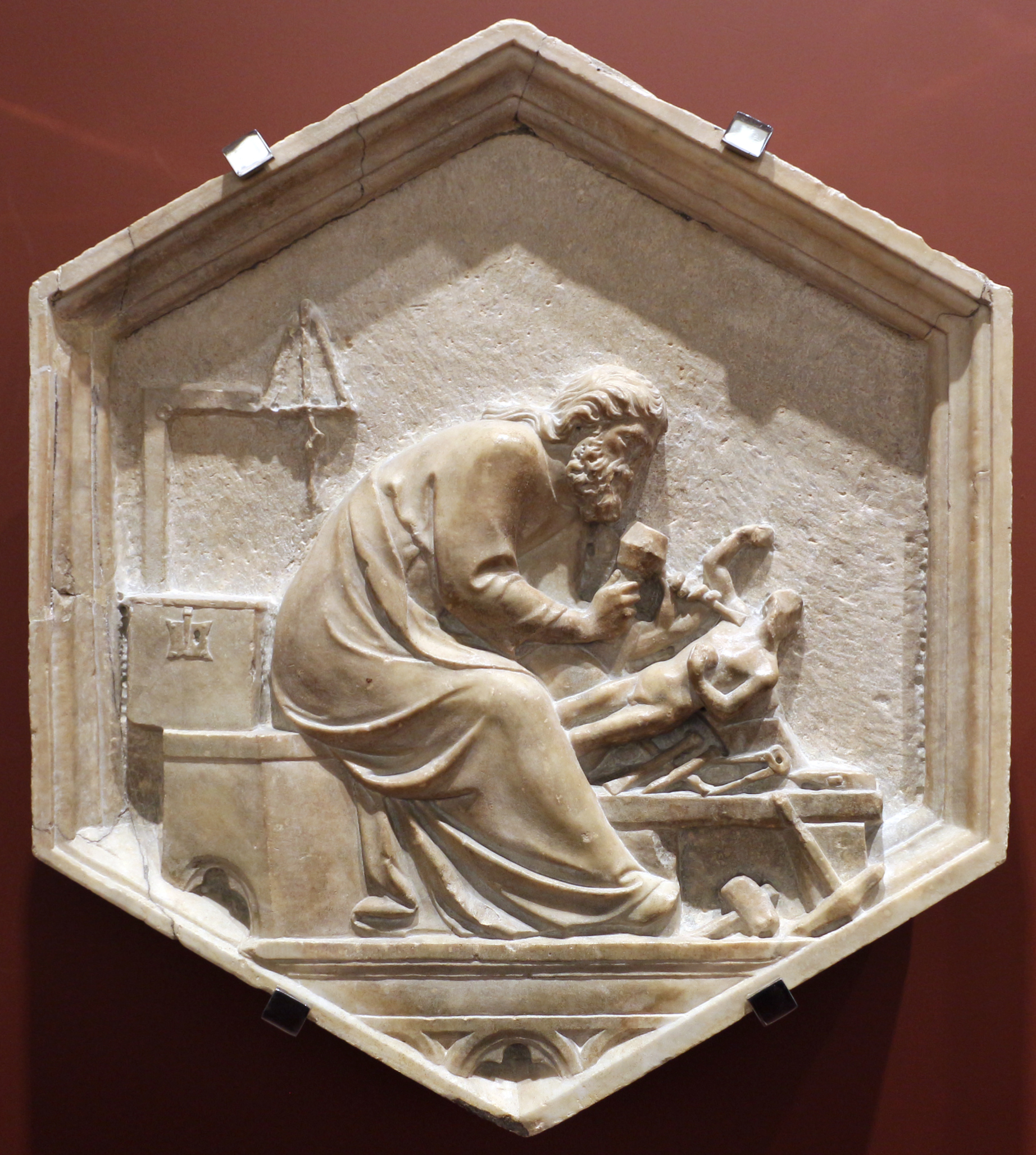
Andrea Pisano (perhaps to a design by Giotto), sculptor at work. Florence campanile, 1348–50.

Most sculptors trained and worked in fairly small workshops (bottega), which often included other family members, and were on the ground floor of the master's residence. Large commissions often required collaborations between different workshops, and travel to the site of the work for extended periods. The largest fairly stable 15th-century workshop was probably Ghiberti's, but Donatello had a large number of assistants, many for brief periods. The figure of the "isolated single master responsible for the execution of the piece as well as for the design, as we think of Michelangelo, did not arise until" the late 15th century. Several significant sculptors worked in different cities over their career; Rome and Venice in particular imported most of their sculptors, Rome sometimes for a single piece.

A common way of paying for sculpture was to pay a certain amount as work progressed, but to leave the final valuation to "disinterested third parties, usually artists themselves, who were asked to pronounce upon the quality of the workmanship" and find the final value. This, despite some difficult episodes, was "a powerful incentive to meticulous workmanship".

In 1472 Florence had 54 workshops carving stone, and 44 gold and silversmiths, both more than the 30 painter's workshops. There were more wood-carvers than butchers in the city. But the city was untypical, with perhaps the highest concentration in Italy, then rivalled only by Venice; in contrast, Naples and Southern Italy in general had few artists. Large projects in Naples such as the Triumphal entrance to the Castel Nuovo and the Porta Capuana, were designed and executed by artists from the north, or under Alfonso V of Aragon, the King of Naples from 1442 to 1458, his native Spain.

Many sculptors also worked as architects, then not a clearly defined profession, or painters, and those with a background in goldsmithing often continued to pursue the other parts of that profession, making jewellery and acting as bankers. Sculptors, if not from a family of artists, as many were, typically came from middle-class urban backgrounds. Payment or family connections were usually necessary to get an apprenticeship, especially as a goldsmith. Leonardo da Vinci was one of those who regarded sculpture as a less gentlemanly occupation than painting, because it was "dusty, dirty and physically exhausting". But financially it was perhaps typically more rewarding. Pieces were perhaps usually worked on supported into a diagonal position, while the sculptor sat, as shown in the relief by Andrea Pisano. In addition to the chisel he is using, a compass, drill and a book are shown, and the piece he is working on is a nude statue in classical style.

=== Women sculptors ===
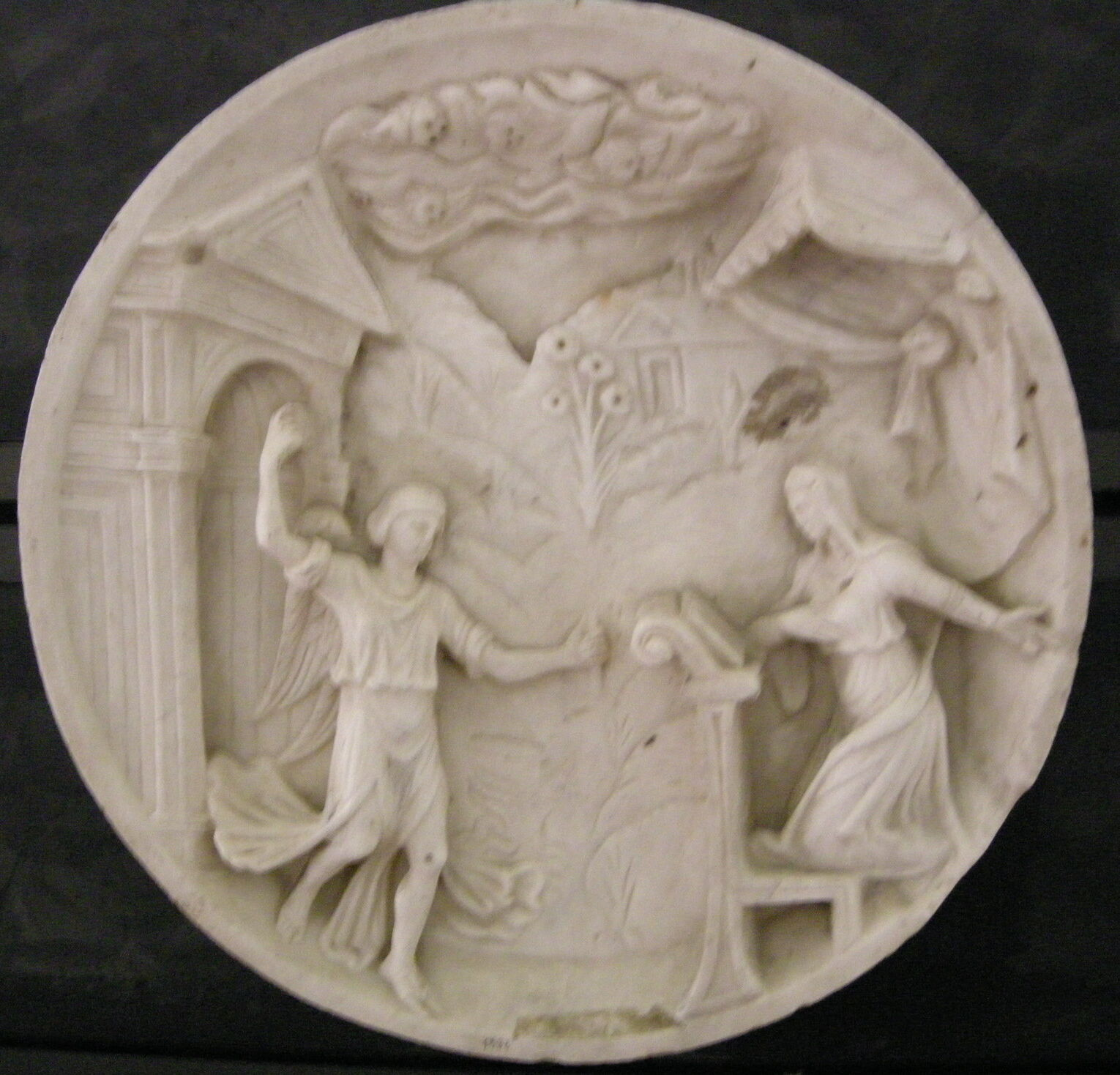
Annunciation, by Properzia de' Rossi

Even compared to painters, recorded women sculptors are vanishingly rare, though probably many are unrecorded, especially modellers in wax. Properzia de' Rossi from Bologna (c. 1490–1530), "Renaissance Italy's only woman sculptor in marble", was regarded as a prodigy for being female, and received a biography in Vasari Lives. Unusually for female artists, as the daughter of a notary she had no evident family background in the arts. She was said to have been self-taught, practising on fruit stones, but later pursued a professional career sculpting marble. Diana Scultori (1547–1612) from Mantua is known as "the only female engraver of the sixteenth century to sign her prints", but trained with her father, who was a printmaker and sculptor, and she may have worked in sculpture.

== Guilds ==
The guilds which sculptors needed to join in most cities were often divided by the materials used, in ways that sometimes hampered the development of the art. Stonecarvers, goldsmiths, workers in other metals, and woodcarvers often belonged to different guilds, though terracotta often lacked a guild. Guilds were especially strong, and politically powerful, in Florence, while in Rome, Venice, and smaller cities they were mostly weak. Their influence reduced considerably over the period. In Florence, carvers of stone and wood shared the Arte dei Maestri di Pietra e Legname ("Guild of Masters in Stone and Wood", one of the Arti Mediane or middle-ranking guilds), and in the 16th century were eventually allowed to join the painters in their Compagnia di San Luca, strictly a confraternity rather than a guild until 1572. The Florentine metal workers were part of the Arte della Seta, the powerful silk guild, one of the Arti Maggiori or "major guilds". Though powerful, the guilds in Florence were more accepting than many smaller cities of "foreign" artists from other cities practicing there, perhaps because so many Florentine masters worked elsewhere themselves.

== Patrons ==
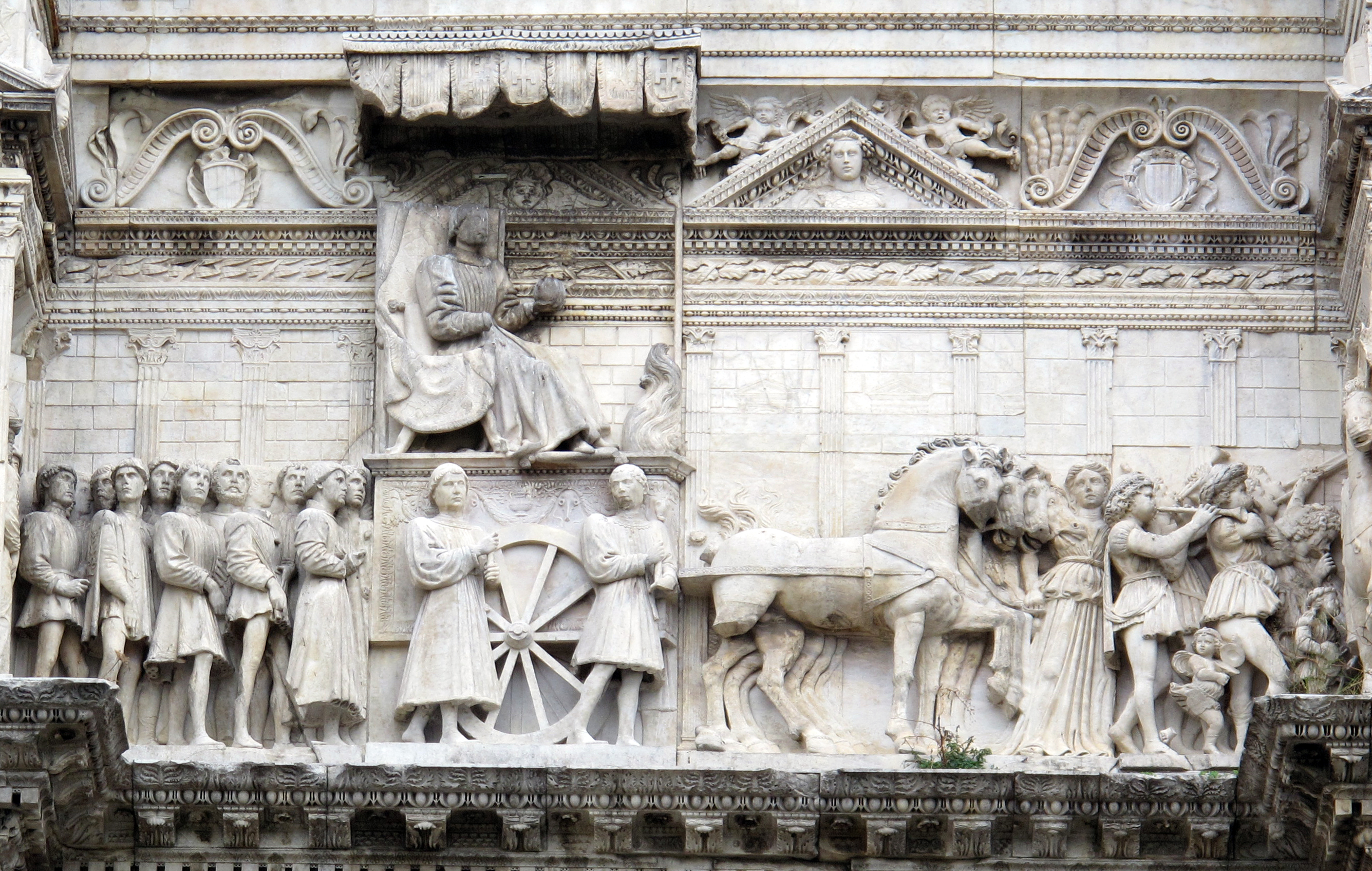
Relief from the "Triumphal arch" of the Castel Nuovo, Naples, showing the entry of the new king Alfonso V of Aragon, late 1450s.

The guilds of Florence were also very important patrons, until the late 15th century at least, often paying for new work in churches, such as the Florence Baptistery doors, and the cathedral's Porta della Mandorla (see below for both). Private commissions were also very often for guild members; the richest guild, the bankers (Arte del Cambio) included many of the Medici and Strozzi. For bankers, expiating the sin of usury by generous contributions to religious and civic institutions was an additional motive.

In the many monarchical princely states of Italy the ruler was the main patron, and they often spent lavishly to glorify themselves: Milan, Rimini, Ferarra, Urbino are examples, but none matched the Medici after they became Grand Dukes of Tuscany in 1531, and wished to promote their new status. After the popes returned from the Avignon captivity in 1376, there was always a certain level of papal patronage, if only for tombs, but this varied considerably with the individual pope (as was also the case with princes). Except for two from the Spanish Borgia family (neither great patrons of sculpture), the popes from 1431 to 1503 came from north Italian families, and were no doubt accustomed to contemporary sculpture. The Juilee Year of 1450 began a programme of urban renewal in Rome, which included using the updating or restoring of churches, including their sculpture, "as seed-beds around which the rebuilding of whole quarters of the city might develop".

Papal sculpture for their palaces and tombs increased enormously in the 16th century under Pope Julius II, Leo X and Clement VII, the last two being Medicis. As the Counter-Reformation developed papal patronage became more variable. Cardinals were often lavish patrons, mostly in and around Rome.

Over the course of the Renaissance the taste, and pockets, of the lesser members of elites, in the nobilities, patricians and wealthy bankers and merchants for art in the latest styles developed, and spread ever further down the social scale. Around 1500, shoulder busts (see below) were sometimes "inexpensive memorials made of terracotta formed from a cast of a death mask added helter-skelter to crudely modelled chest and shoulders".

== Development of style ==
=== To 1400 ===
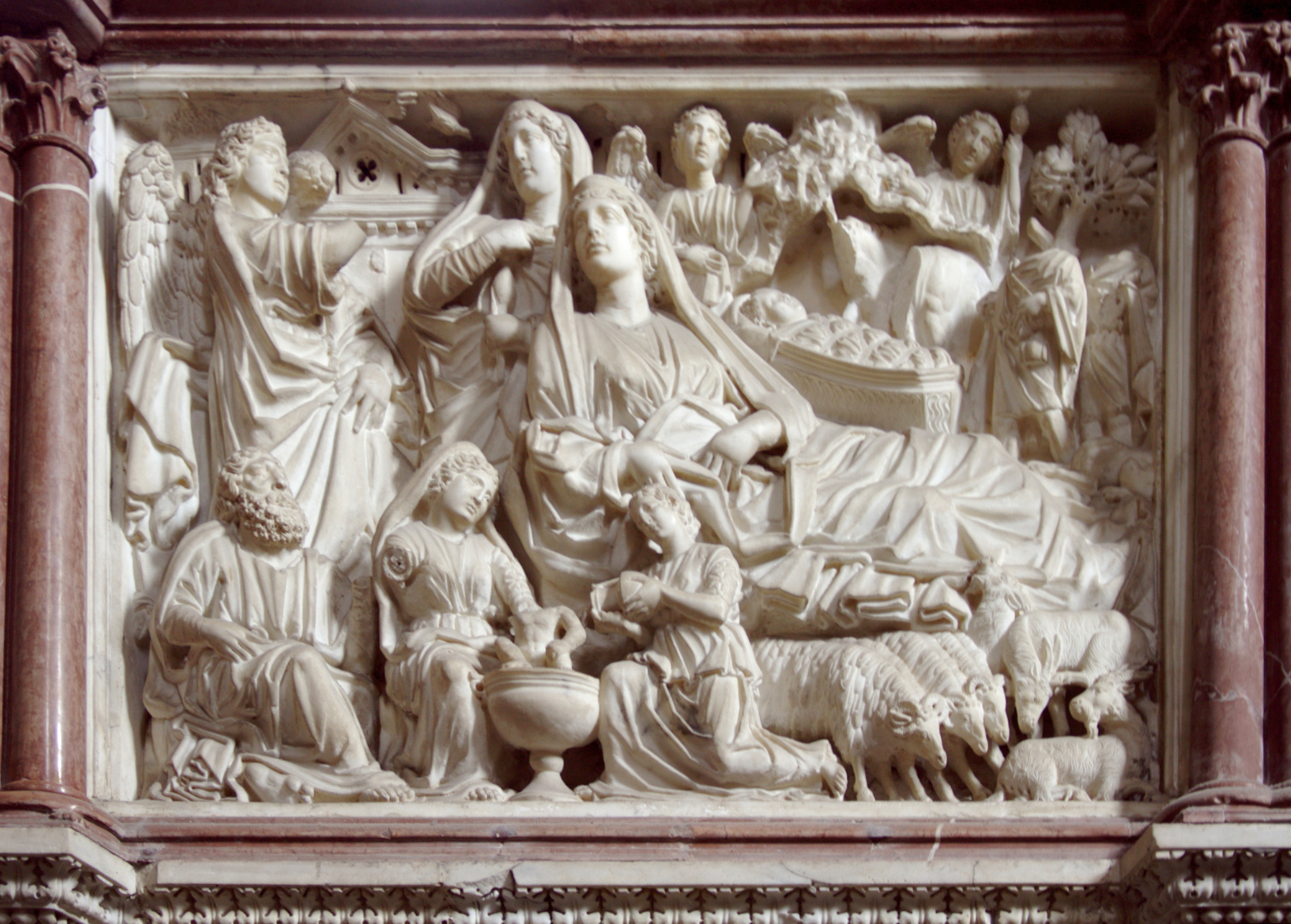
Nicola Pisano, Nativity scene from the pulpit in the Pisa Baptistery, 1260

Especially in the 15th century, reliefs, as opposed to sculpture in the round, were a much larger proportion of fine sculpture than has been the case subsequently. Modern viewers are therefore relatively unused to the form, and inclined to overlook them. Until the Laocoön Group was dug up in the centre of Rome in 1506, the most dramatic and athletic poses in known Roman sculptures were crowded reliefs on Late Roman sarcophagi, while the known statues were nearly all dignified but rather static standing portraits.

Nicola Pisano (active c, 1240s to 1278) was the leading sculptor of what Erwin Panofsky called "the classicizing Proto-Renaissance". His major works were sets of reliefs, especially those on the large raised pulpits of the baptistery at Pisa (dated 1260) and Siena Cathedral. He had a large workshop, including his son Giovanni Pisano, and the many sculptures on the Great Fountain at Perugia (1277–1278) were probably designed by Nicola, but mostly carved by them. His larger panels show crowded scenes, sometimes combining scenes in a single composition, for example the Annunciation and Nativity of Christ on the pulpit in the Pisa Baptistery; most depictions at this period would have shown two scenes in different compartments. Pisano's youth in his native Apulia in the far south of Italy was passed when Frederick II, Holy Roman Emperor reigned, and mostly lived there, promoting a Roman revival in the arts. Pisano is clearly influenced by study of Ancient Roman sarcophagi.

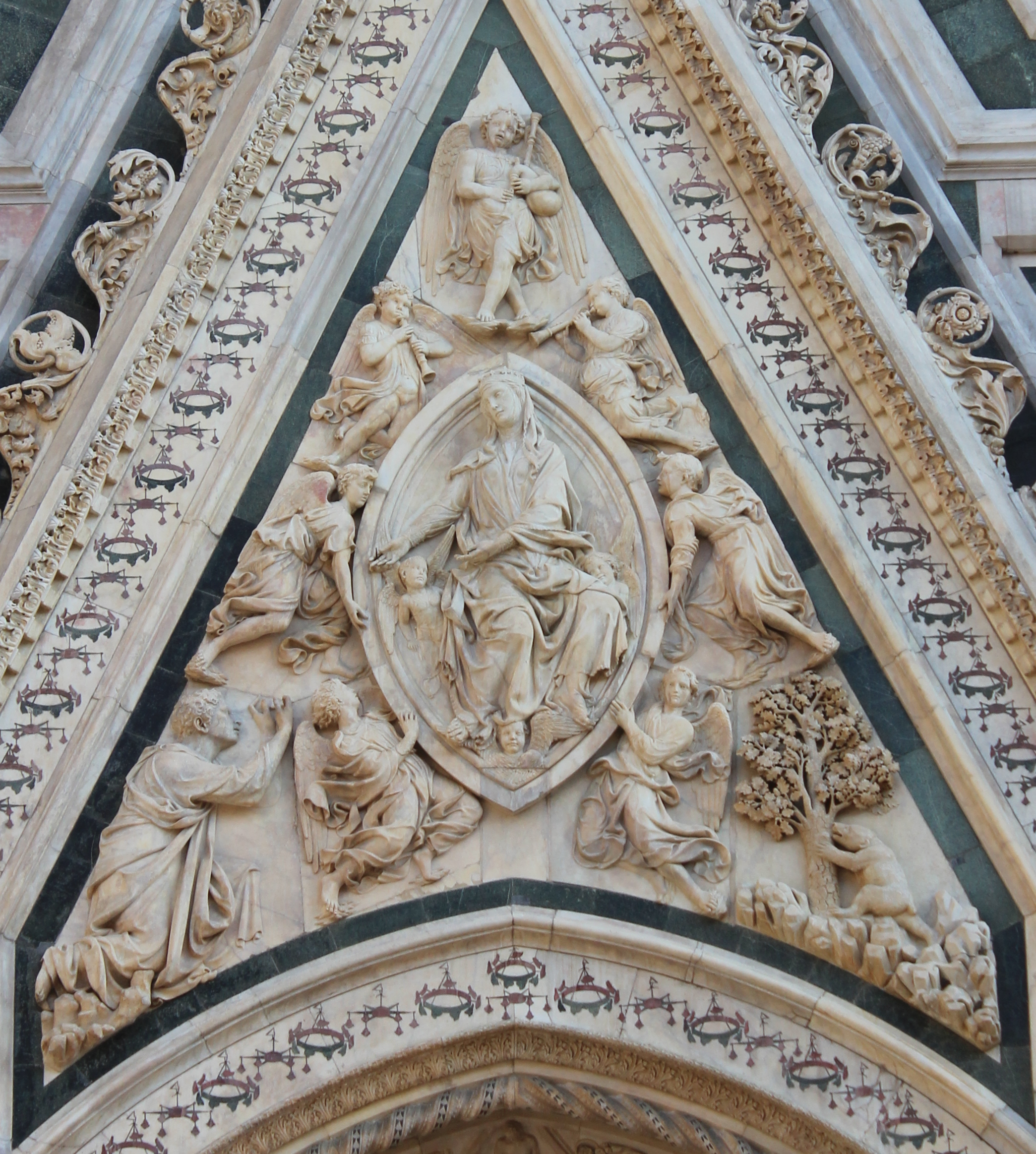
Main relief of the Assumption, Porta di Mandorla, Florence Cathedral, Nanni di Banco

Nicola's son Giovanni Pisano took over his father's workshop in the 1280s, and was much more receptive to Gothic style than his father. Over the next century Gothic and classical influences were found together in many large works, sometimes in contention. By the 1380s, "a vigorous movement" was emerging in several parts of Italy which set the ground for the styles of the next century. But the 1390s also "began the apogee in Tuscany of a Gothic wave" in the International Gothic style; the large "Porta della Mandorla" of Florence Cathedral, sponsored by the Arte della Lana or wool weavers' guild, which many sculptors contributed to, demonstrates this complex picture.

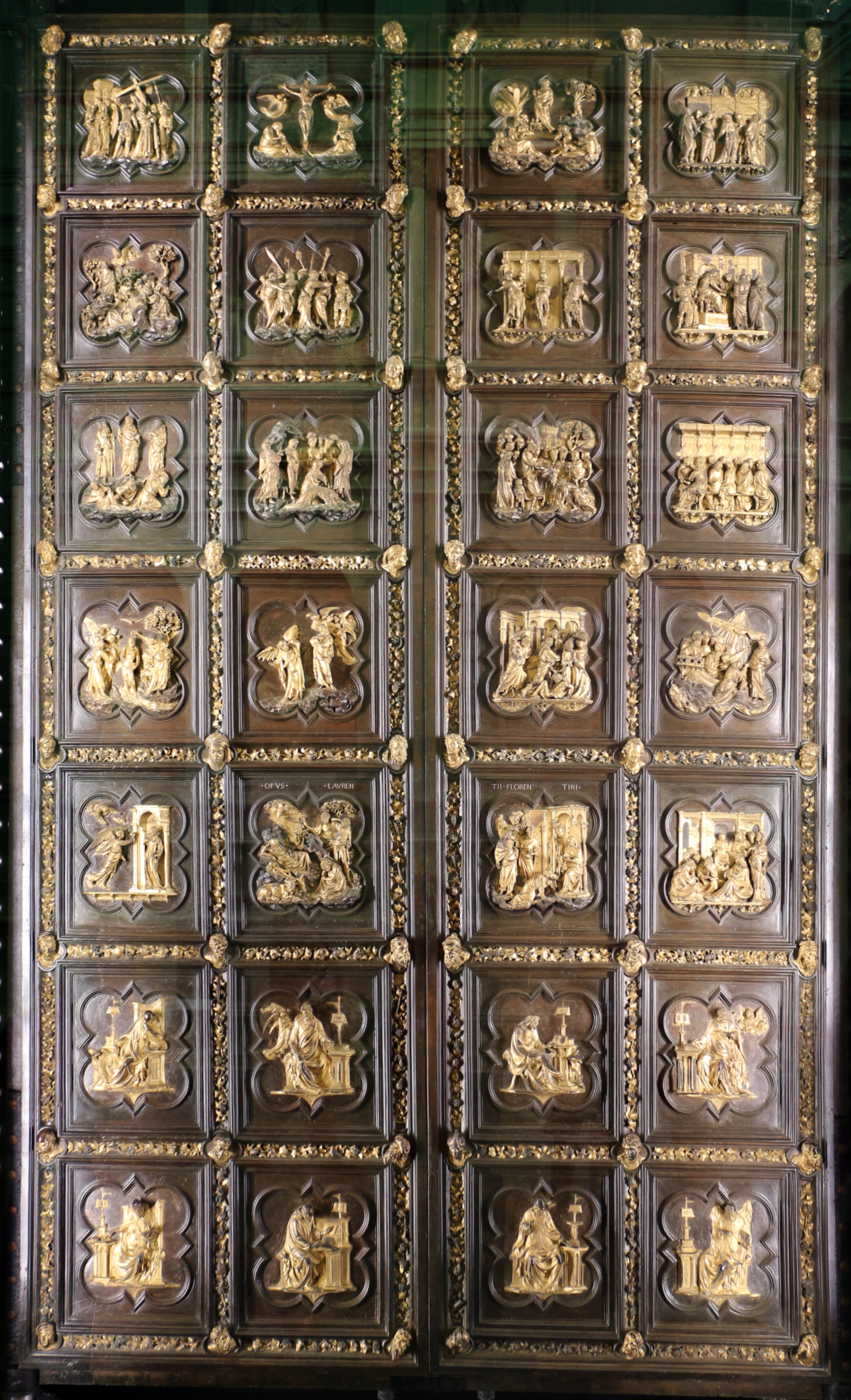
The north doors of the Florence Baptistery, Lorenzo Ghiberti and workshop, 1401 to after 1415

=== From 1400 ===
==== Doors of the Florence Baptistery ====
In the winter of 1400–1401 the Arte di Calimala or cloth merchant's guild, announced that there would be a competition for designs for a new pair of bronze doors for the east side of the Florence Baptistery (now moved to the north side), which they were paying for. One factor in the timing may have been the progress being made on the cathedral's sculpture, paid for by a rival guild. Having a competition was unusual, but the commission was an extremely prominent one. From numerous applications, a shortlist of seven sculptors were chosen, all Tuscan but not all Florentines. The doors were to have a typical format of 28 figurative panels in bronze, seven rows in two columns on each door. The shortlist were asked to provide models for a relief panel within a quatrefoil frame that was supplied, matching those on the existing south doors by Andrea Pisano (begun 1329). The subject was the Sacrifice of Isaac (never in fact used, as the programme was changed to show only New Testament subjects). There was a jury of 34, most artists. Very unexpectedly, the winner was declared to be Lorenzo Ghiberti, then only 22 years old.

Two of the trial reliefs survive, those by Ghiberti and the runner-up, Filippo Brunelleschi, also in his early 20s. The jury found it very difficult to decide between them, and proposed that the two collaborate, but Brunelleschi declined, and after this defeat increasingly turned to architecture. The decision was acrimonious, and the dispute continued to cause bad feeling for many years. Both compositions reflected awareness of the latest Florentine styles, antique sculpture, and the northern International Gothic; the choice was in no way between new and old styles. Ghiberti's figures are more effectively integrated with the landscape background. In Ghiberti "the mood is far gentler" than Brunelleschi's "stark, stoic interpretation". Ghiberti's Isaac was an idealized nude, with "the suggestion of a touchingly mute and child-like heroism in the face of inexplicable doom", also described as "the first truly Renaissance nude figure; in it naturalism and classicism are blended and sublimated by a new vision of what a human being can be".

Ghiberti had to establish a foundry and expand his workshop, which came to number about 25 people, including Donatello, Michelozzo, Paolo Uccello, and Masolino. The first doors were not hung until 1424, and the following year the guild commissioned a further set from him, the so-called "Gates of Paradise" (after a remark by Michelangelo). This time there was no competition, but there was a gap of some years before work started; all the main casting seems to have been done in 1436, but they were not completed until 1452. This time there are only ten, larger, main panels, five high on each door. They are square, and fully rather than partially gilded. The figures are no larger, but are set in perspectival landscapes or cityscapes. Different levels of relief are used in a masterful way to concentrate the viewer's gaze on the most important elements.

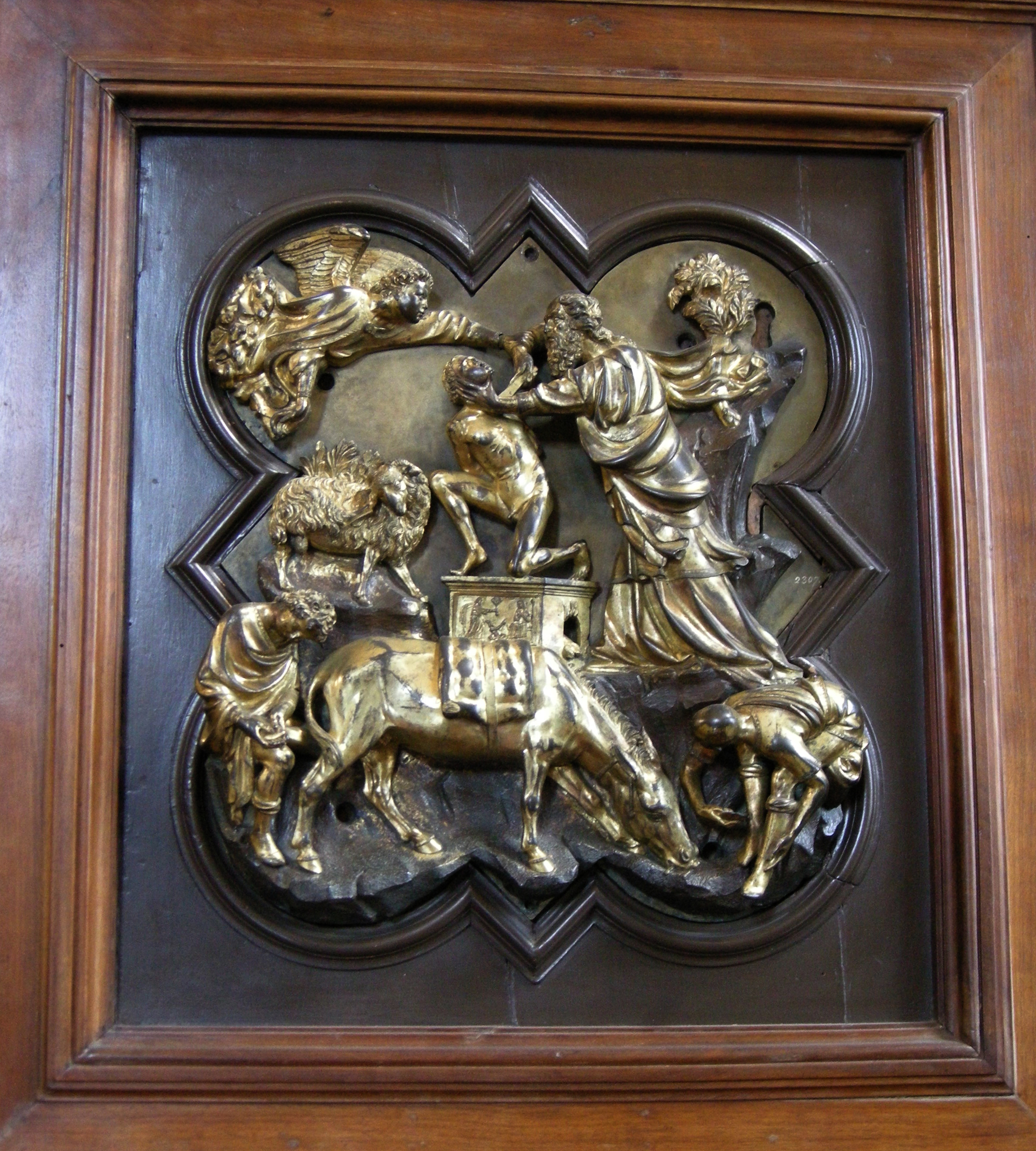
The Sacrifice of Isaac, Brunelleschi's trial piece for the north doors of the Florence Baptistery competition, 1401

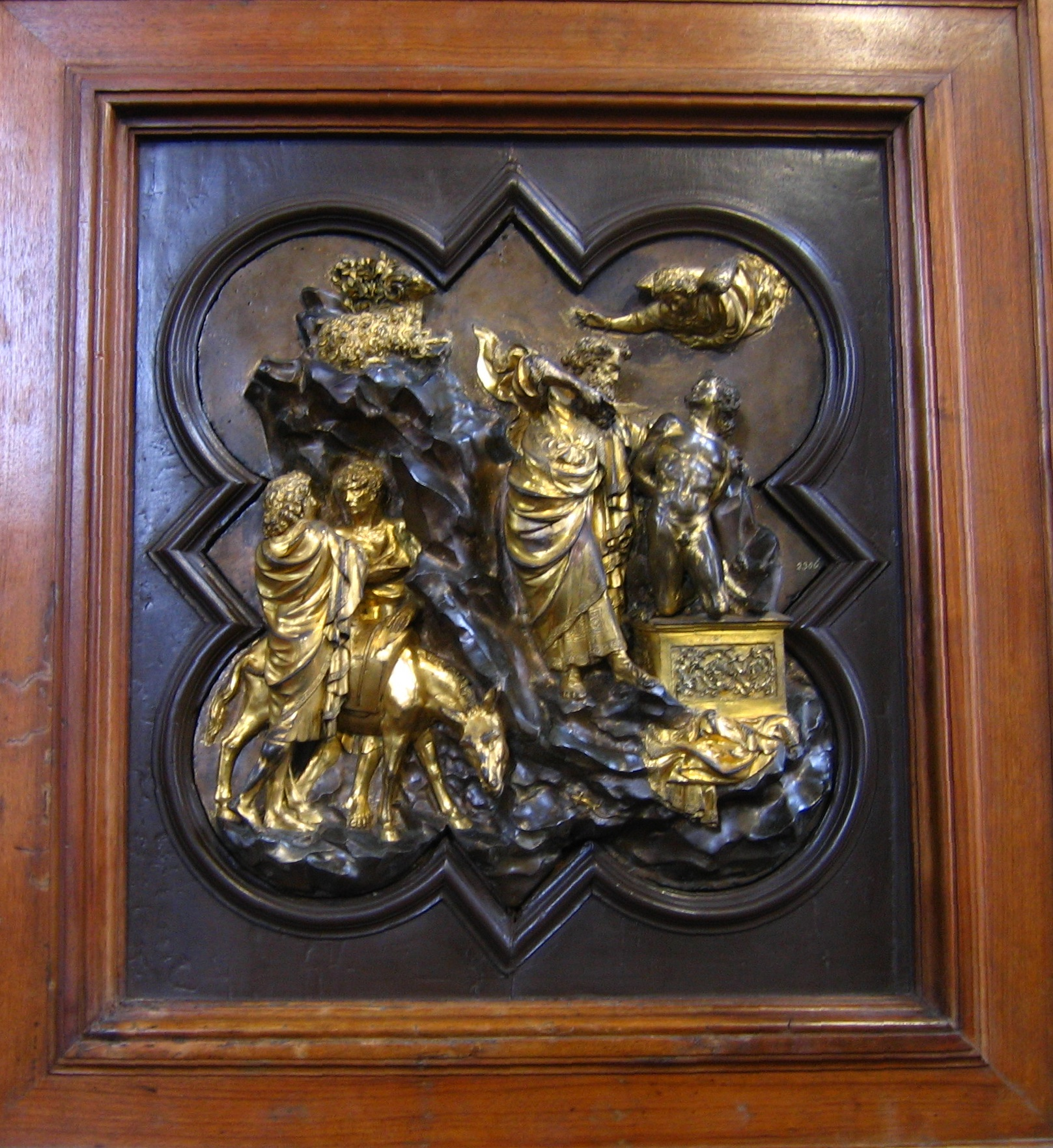
The Sacrifice of Isaac, Ghiberti's winning piece for the 1401 competition

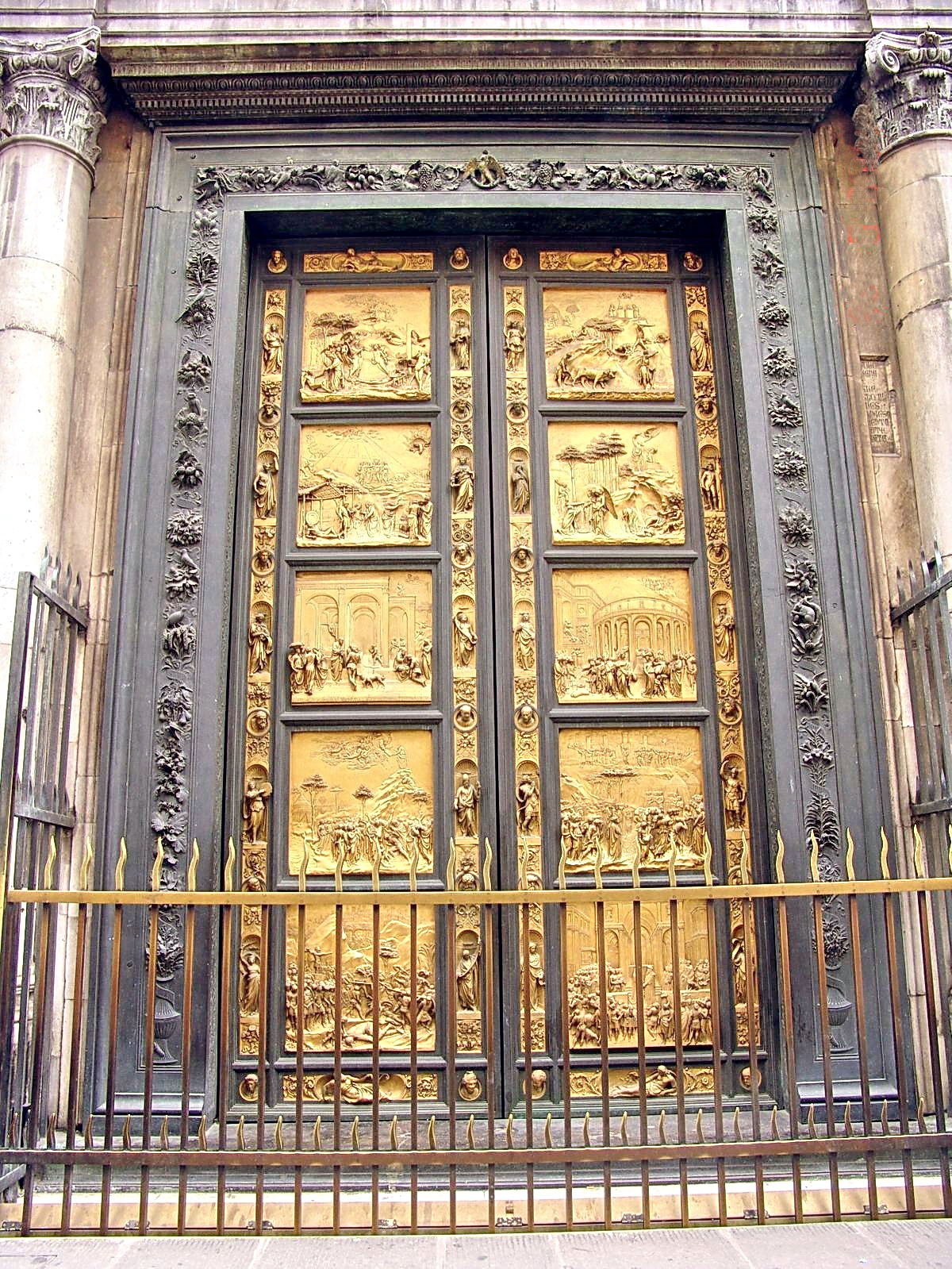
Gates of Paradise, Baptistery, Florence, the doors in situ are reproductions

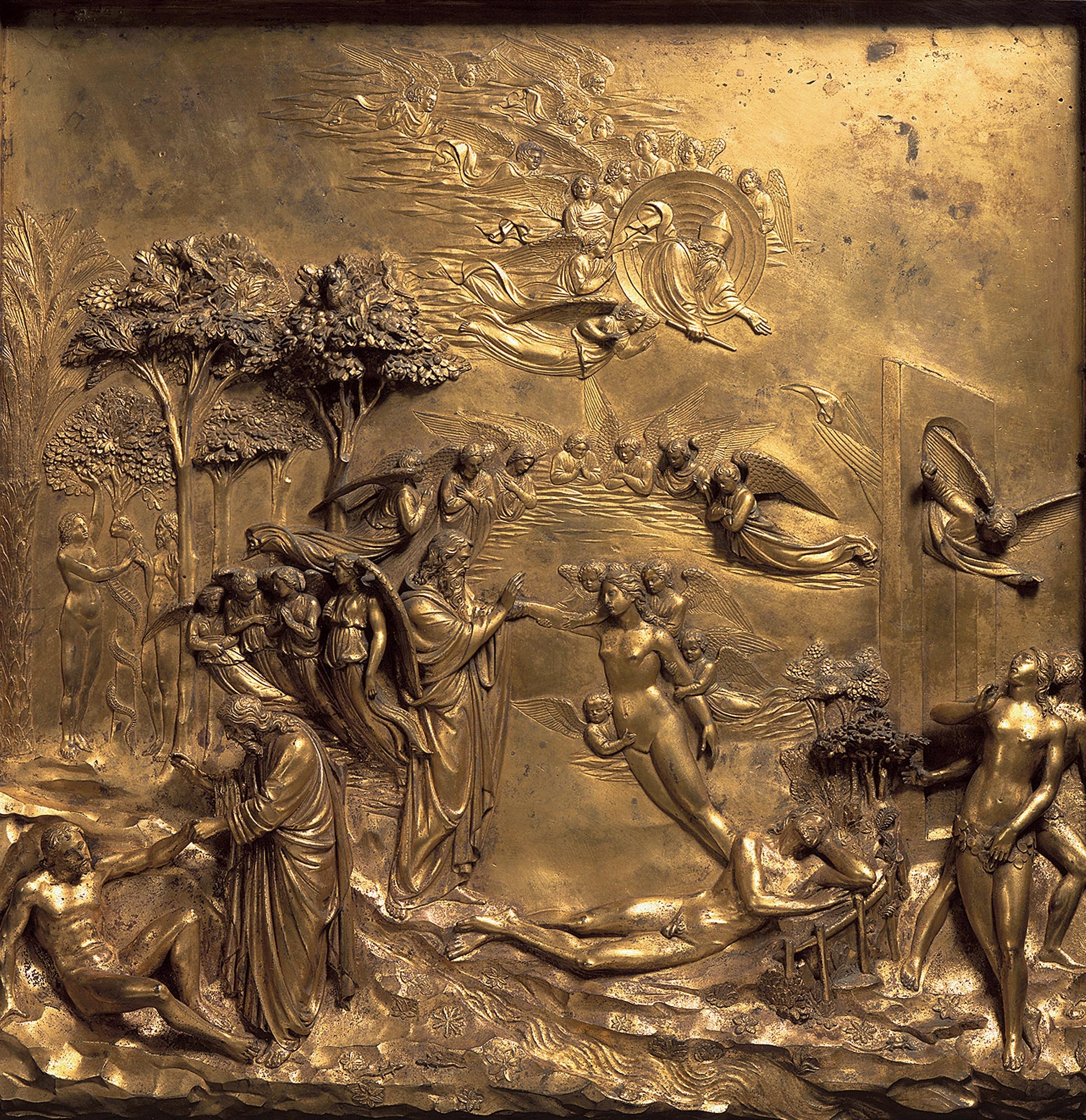
Adam and Eve, from the Gates of Paradise

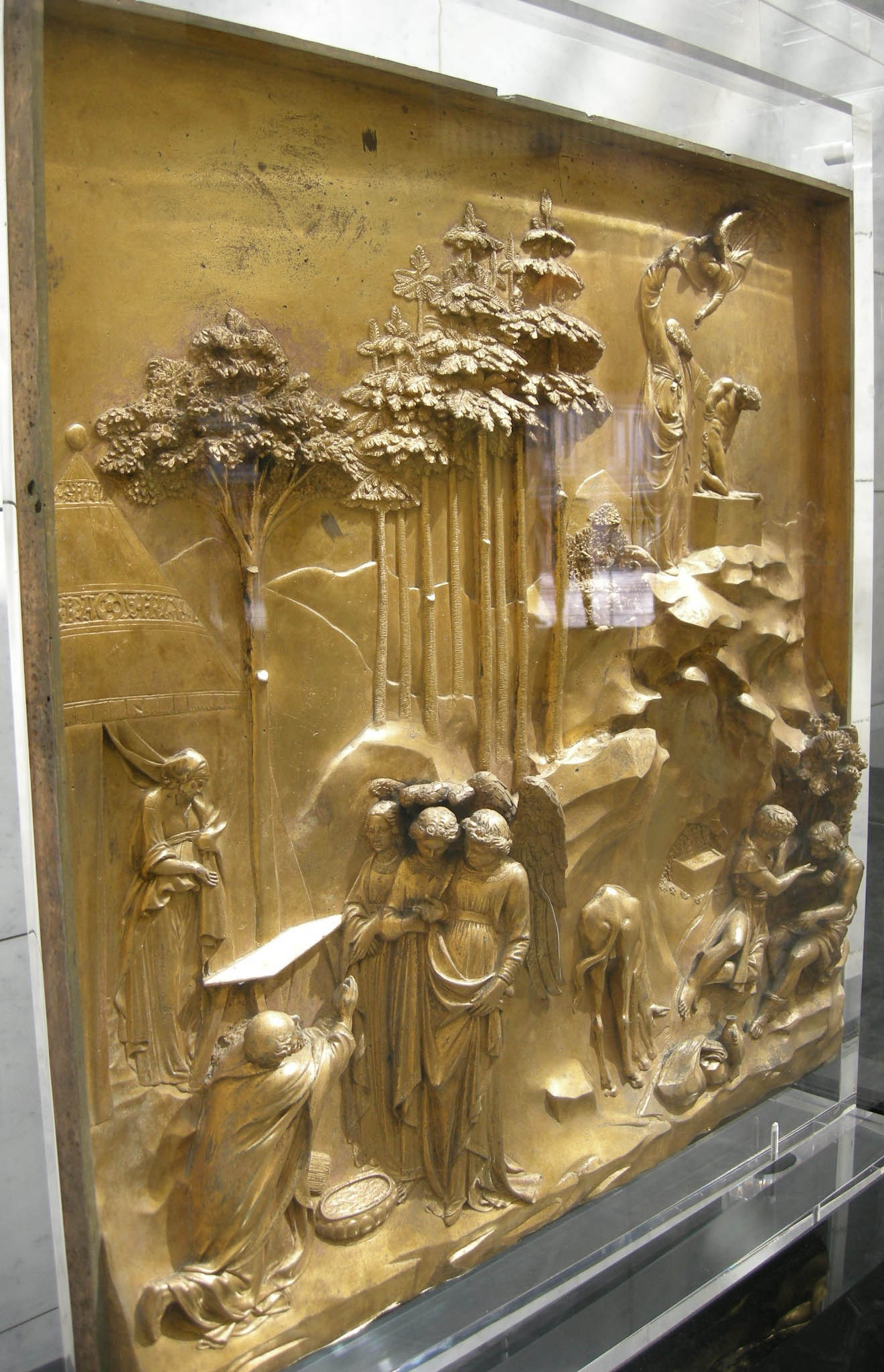
Angled view of a panel with the story of Abraham from the Gates of Paradise

==== Donatello ====
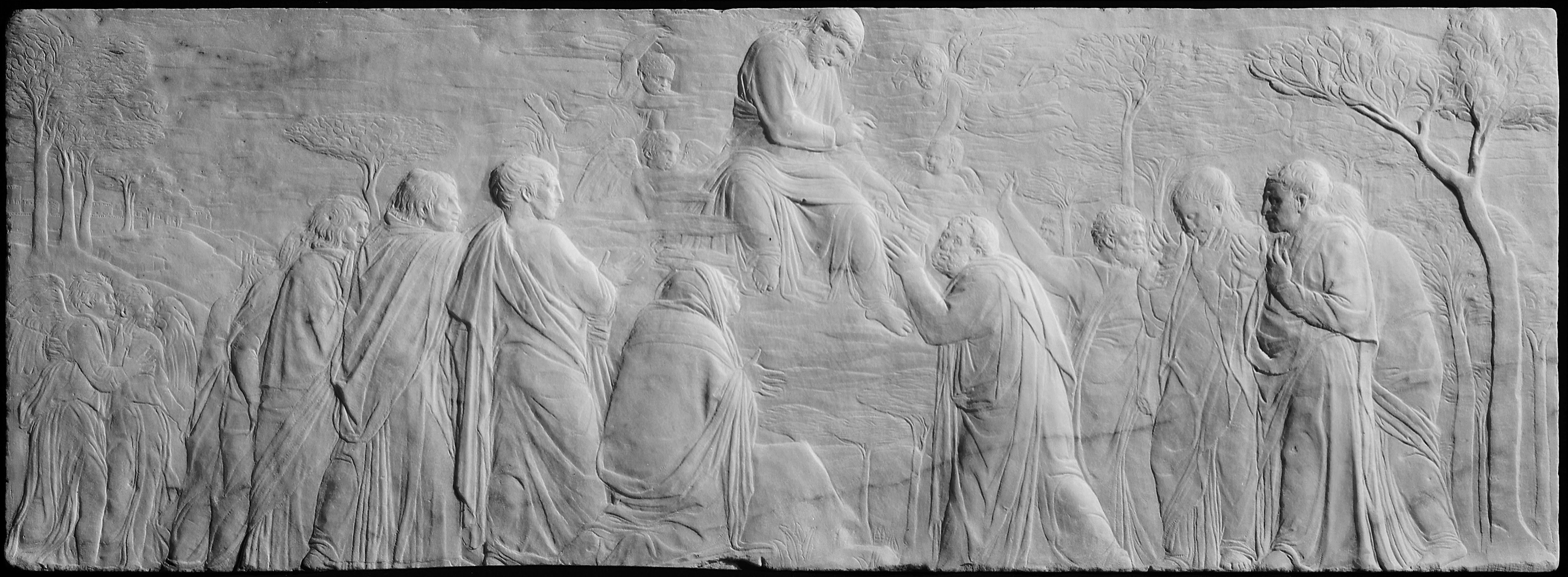
The Ascension with Christ giving the Keys to St. Peter, 1428–1430, in typical very low relief.

Donatello, "the most influential individual artist of the 15th century", started receiving significant commissions in about 1408, mostly in marble, and by 1411 his Saint Mark was commissioned for the Orsanmichele. For the next half-century he was the most important and inventive sculptor in Italy, bringing Renaissance style to maturity. His work was always highly expressive of emotion, in a variety of different moods, and in his last years this often takes a more intense turn.

He developed a style of very shallow and delicate relief, called stiacciato, whilst also excelling at statues, including the challenging first bronze equestrian one (see above). His second, bronze, David is deservedly one of the most famous sculptures of the period, and the first free-standing nude statue of the Renaissance. David, the biblical giant-killer, was a symbol of Florence, and a bronze by Verrocchio was another Medici commission in the 1470s, followed by Michelangelo's famous marble statue early in the next century.

Donatello spent extended periods in Rome, in his youth with Filippo Brunelleschi and later in 1430–33 with his then partner Michelozzo; both are now better known as architects. This deepened his understanding of classical style. In 1443 he left Florence for Padua, for his equestrian Gattamelata (see above), founding a bronze-casting tradition there. He was away ten years, during which his harsher final style began to develop.

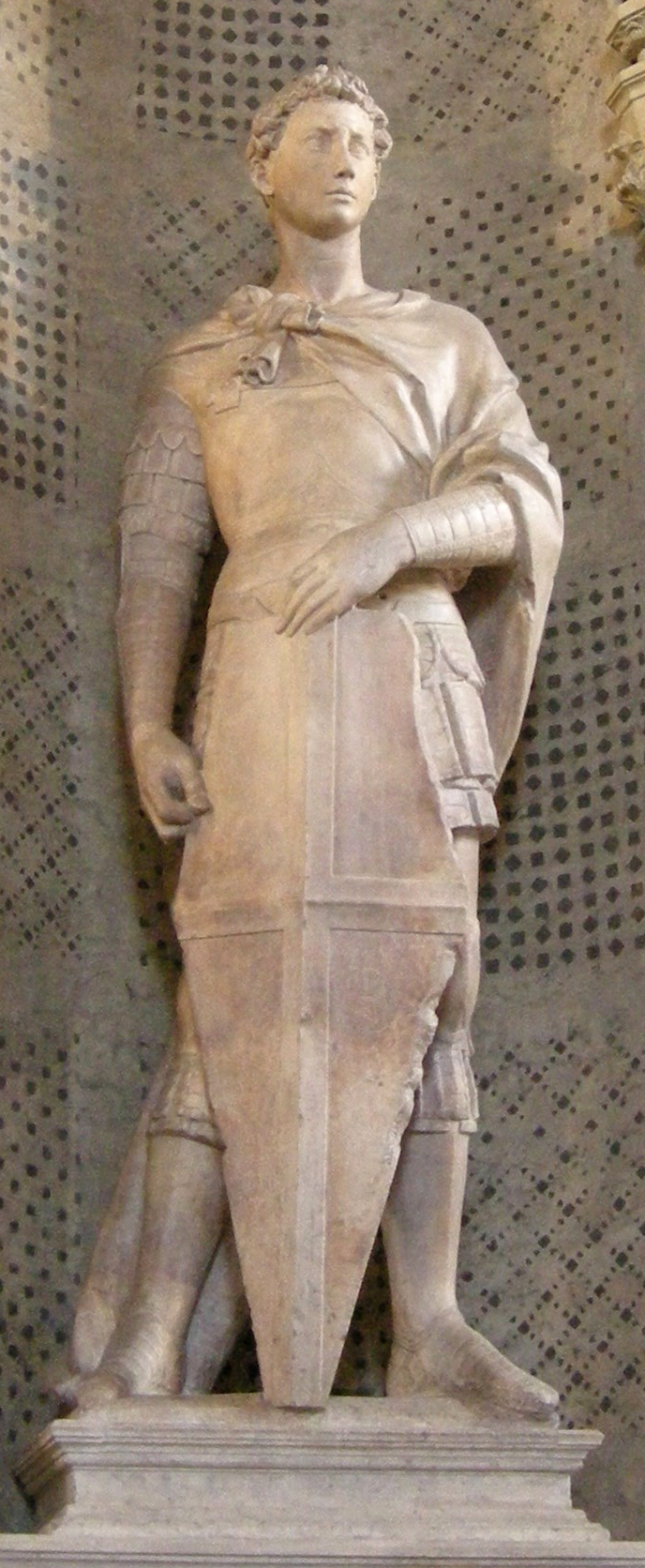
St George, marble, for Orsanmichele, 1415–17

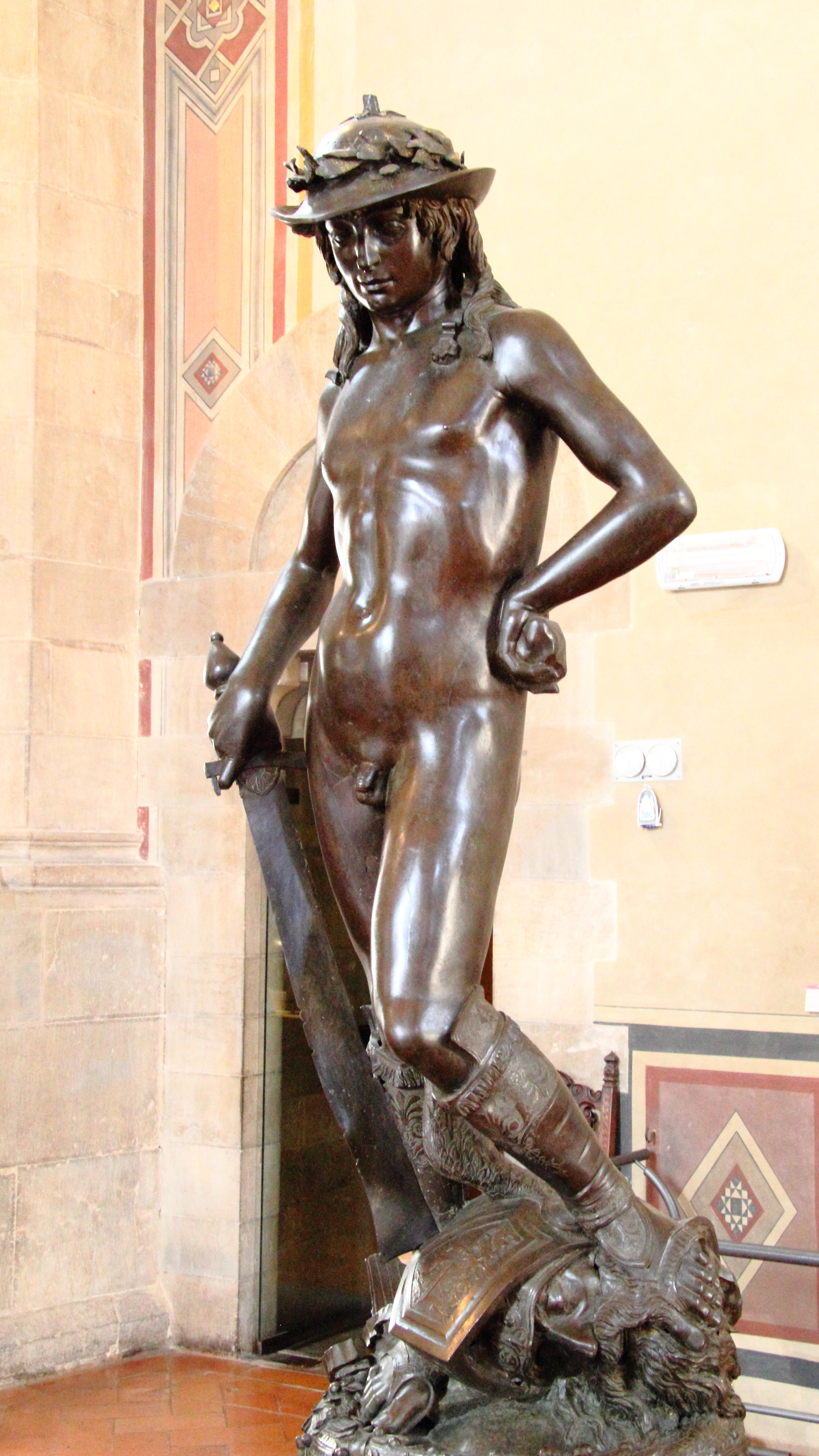
The bronze David (1440s?), Bargello Florence, h.158 cm

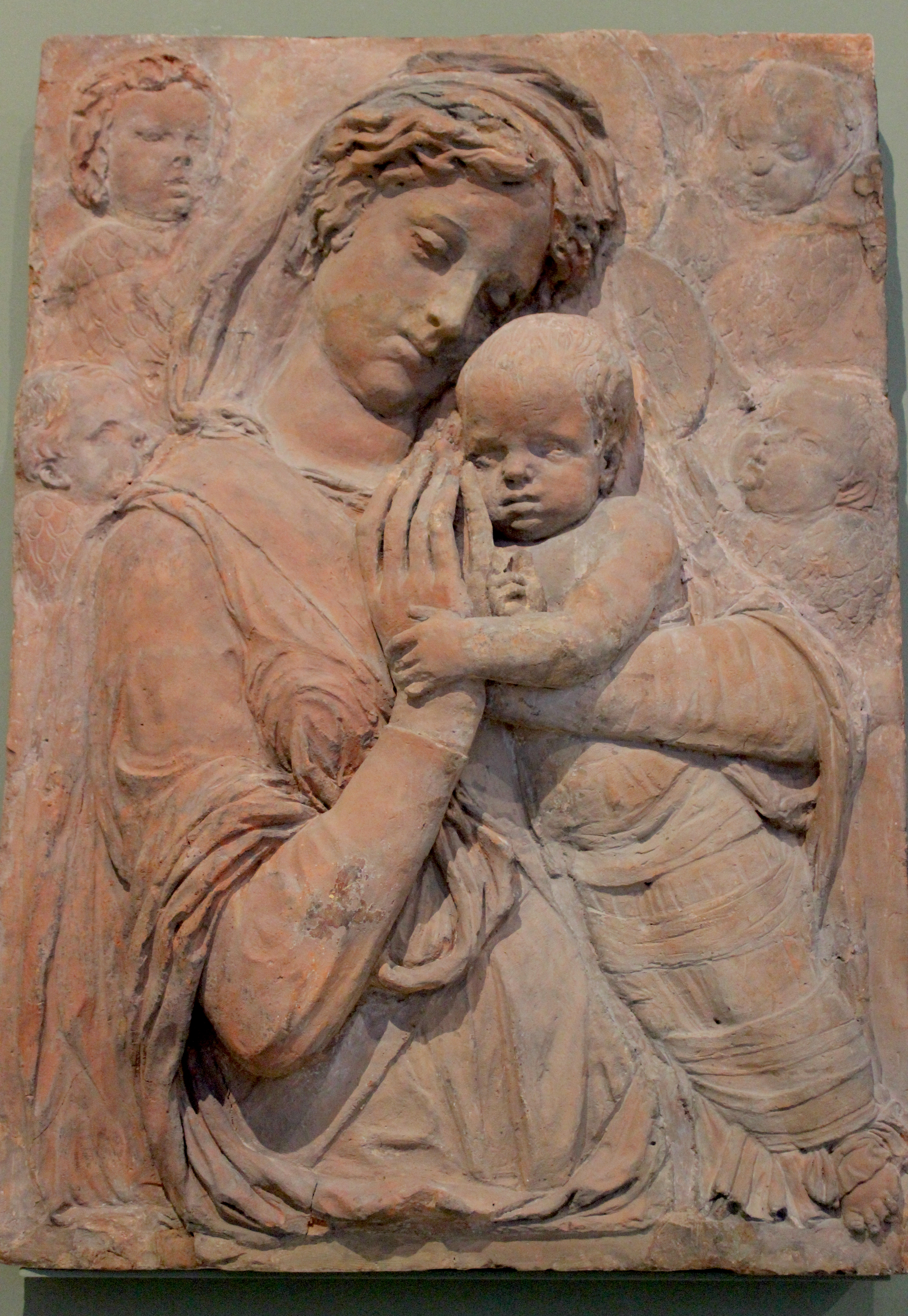
Madonna and Child with Four Cherubs, terracotta, originally with colour

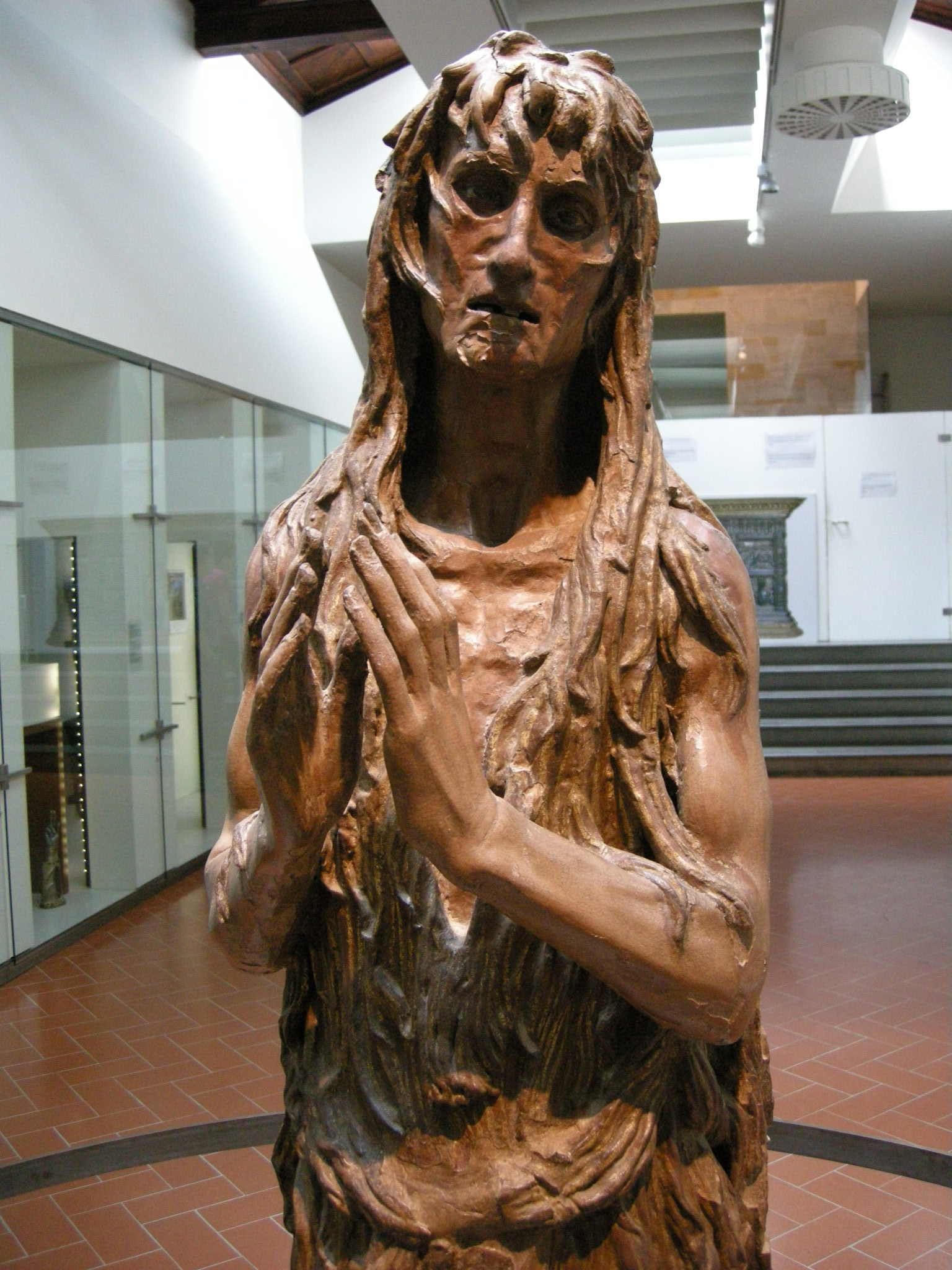
Penitent Magdalene, wood, c. 1455

==== Middle of the century ====
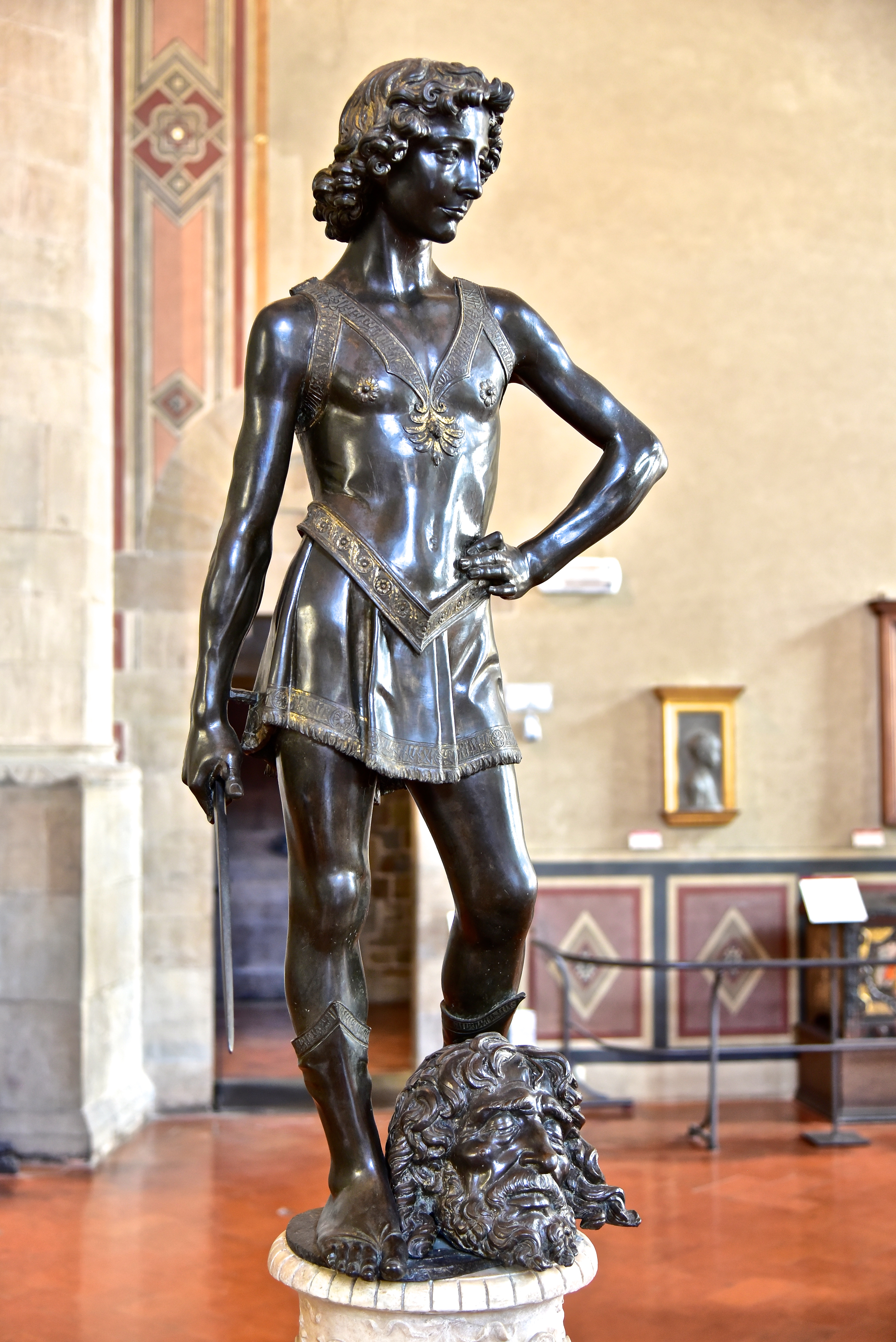
David by Andrea del Verrocchio, 1470s

From about 1430 to the 1480s there were a remarkable number of significant sculptors, working in personal variations of the style established by Ghiberti, Donatello, and others. Charles Avery describes as "the two disparate sculptural modes of the mid-century, the 'sweet-style' of Ghiberti and the brutal expressionism of Donatello", noting that Verrocchio "was able to blend" the two.

Luca della Robbia's first documented work is a singing gallery or cantoria in Florence Cathedral (1431–38) with reliefs of children. After Donatello returned from Rome, he was commissioned to do a matching one (1433–40). According to Roberta Olsen, "while Luca's consummately sweet, refined figures create an ideal mood, Donatello's freely expressive putti are ribald. They are pudgy unorthodox angels ... By contrast, Luca's restrained figures ... could be portraits of real children. His allusions to antiquity are covert while Donatello's are overt".

With Donatello absent in Padua from 1443 to 1453, the 'sweet style' dominated Florentine sculpture for the next 25 years, with the older Luca della Robbia, the brothers Bernardo and Antonio Rossellino later joined by Andrea del Verrocchio as leading figures.

Apart from those already mentioned, Desiderio da Settignano (d. 1464, in his mid-thirties) is less generally known, as he died very young, and many of his works are relatively small religious reliefs, marked by "delicacy" and "extreme subtlety". He also produced several portraits of children. A pupil was probably the unidentified Master of the Marble Madonnas who continued in his style in the next generation.

The Tempio Malatestiano in Rimini was designed by Leone Battista Alberti, the leading art theorist of the day, for Sigismondo Malatesta, the city's ruler who was also commander of the papal army, before becoming "the only living person publicly consigned to Hell by the Pope" (in 1460).

It was never completed as planned, but remains extremely important architecturally, as well as the interior having "the richest sculptural decoration of any Renaissance building" to 1449, when the first sculpture was added. Both inside and out, the sculpture is in a fairly low relief, in bands running vertically or horizontally on many surfaces. The subject matter was sometimes innovative, with chapels now called after "the Playing Children", "the Planets" and the "Arts and Sciences", from the subjects of the reliefs. The main workshop responsible was that of Agostino di Duccio; another may have shared the work, perhaps that of Matteo de' Pasti.

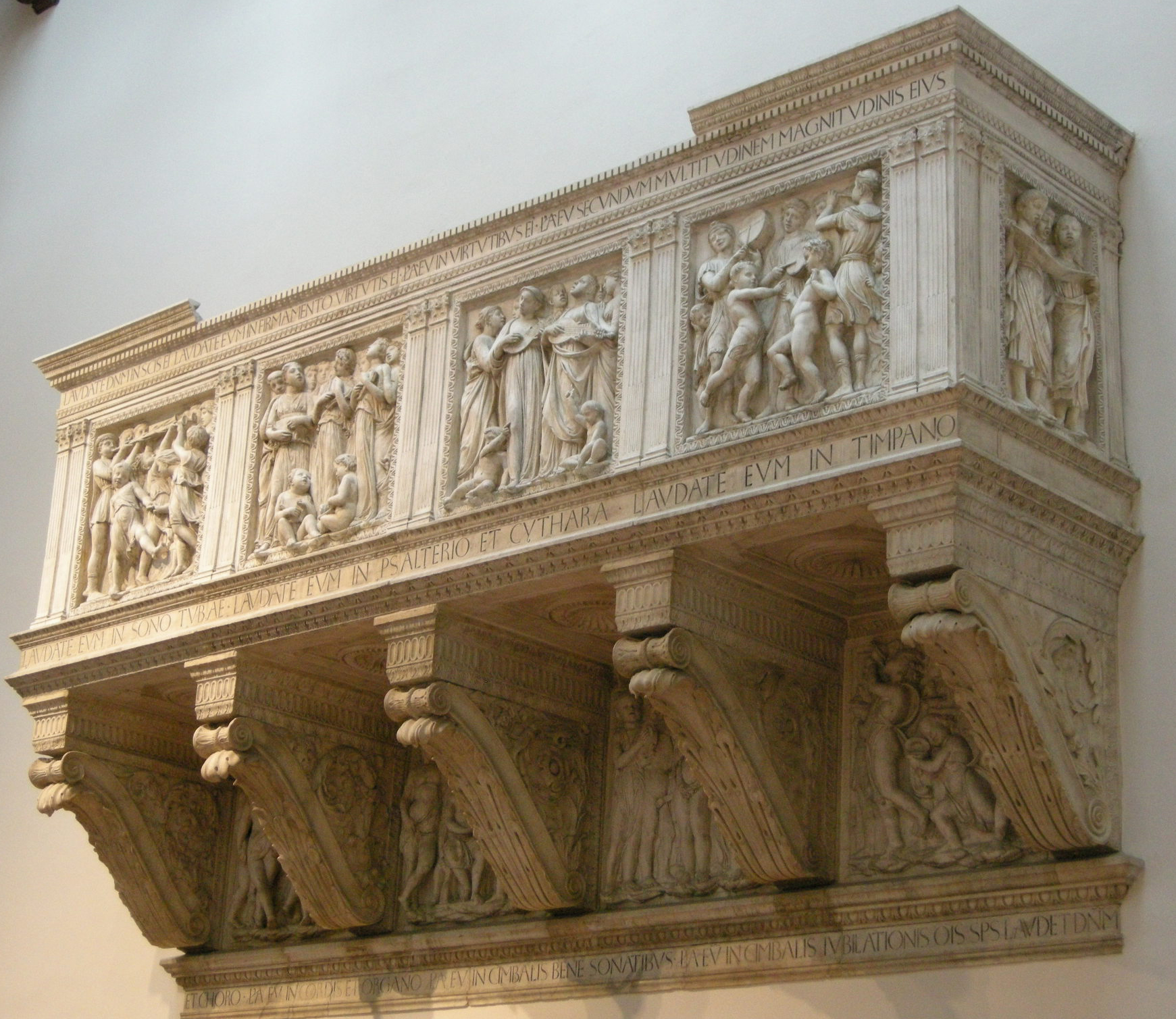
Luca della Robbia's cantoria, now Florence Cathedral Museum

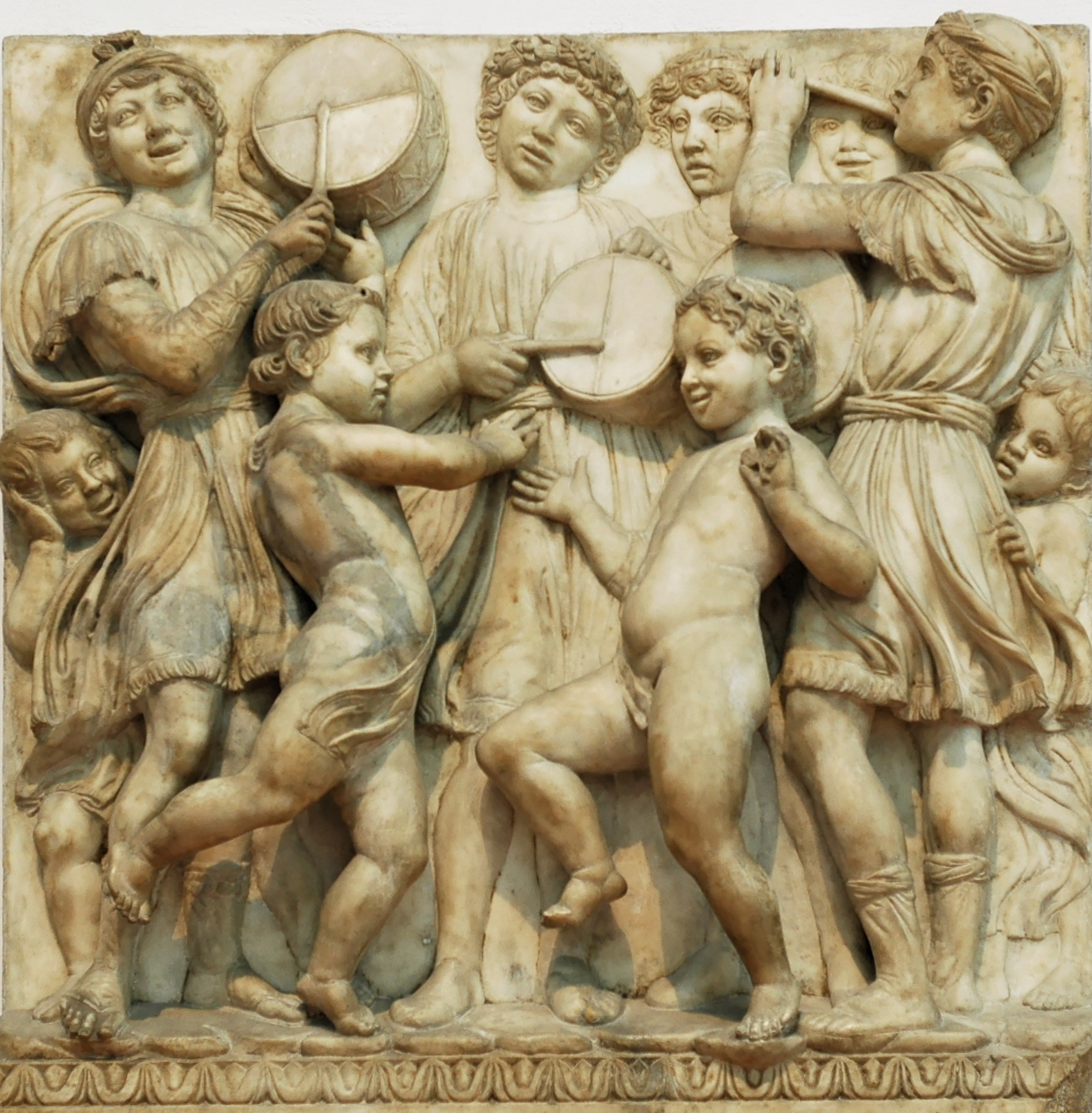
Detail of Luca della Robbia's cantoria

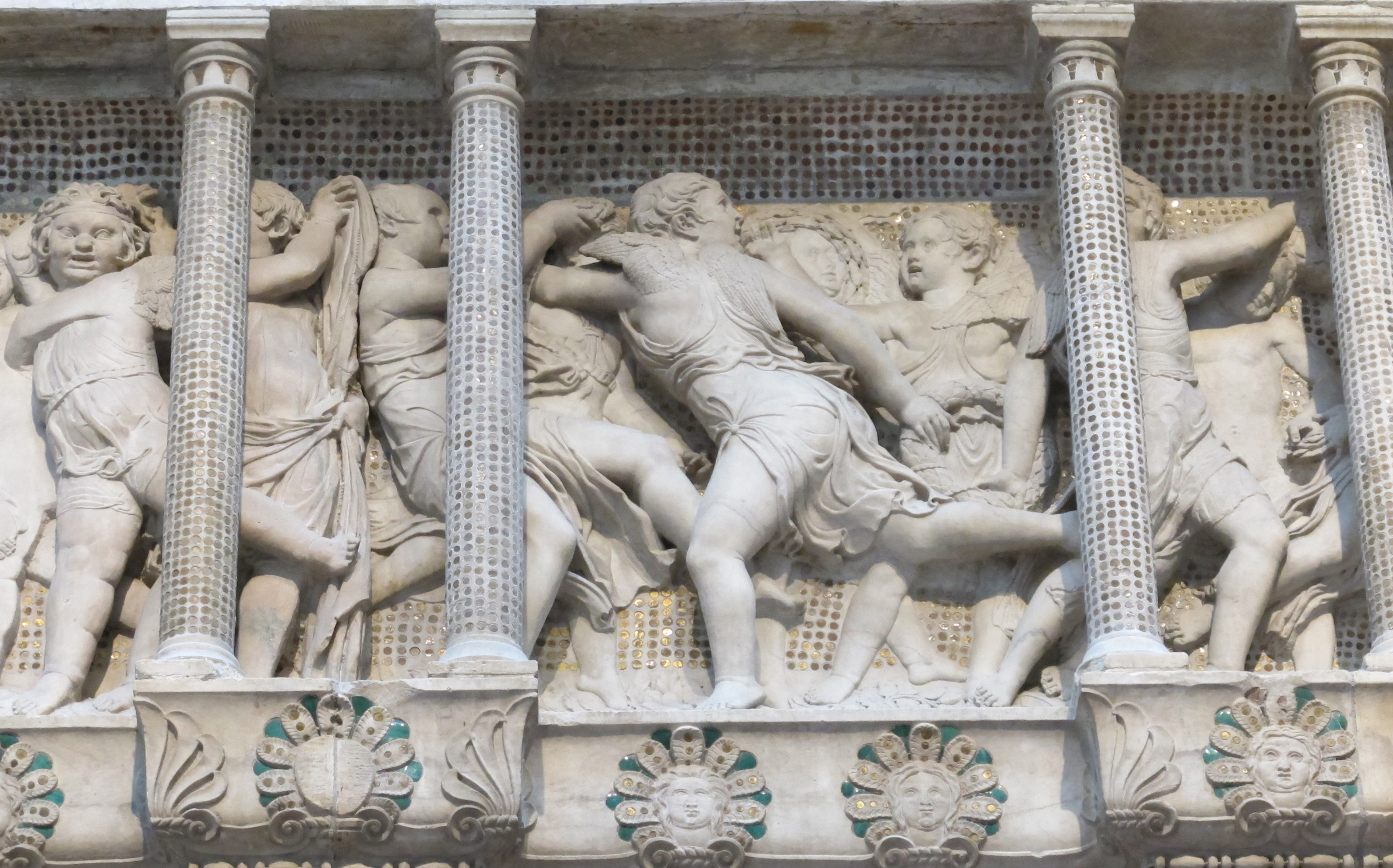
Detail of the Donatello cantoria

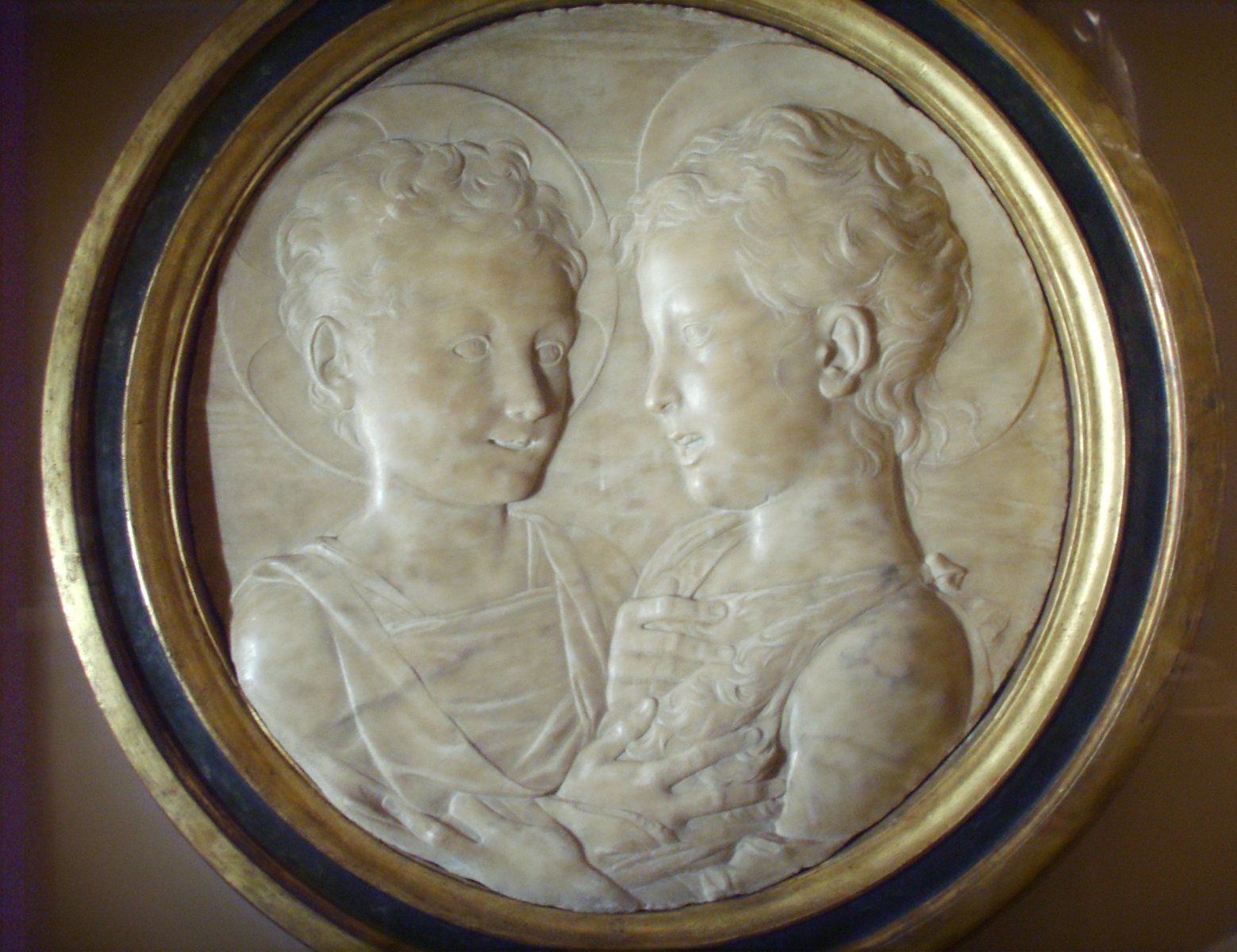
Desiderio da Settignano, Jesus and John the Baptist, 1455–57

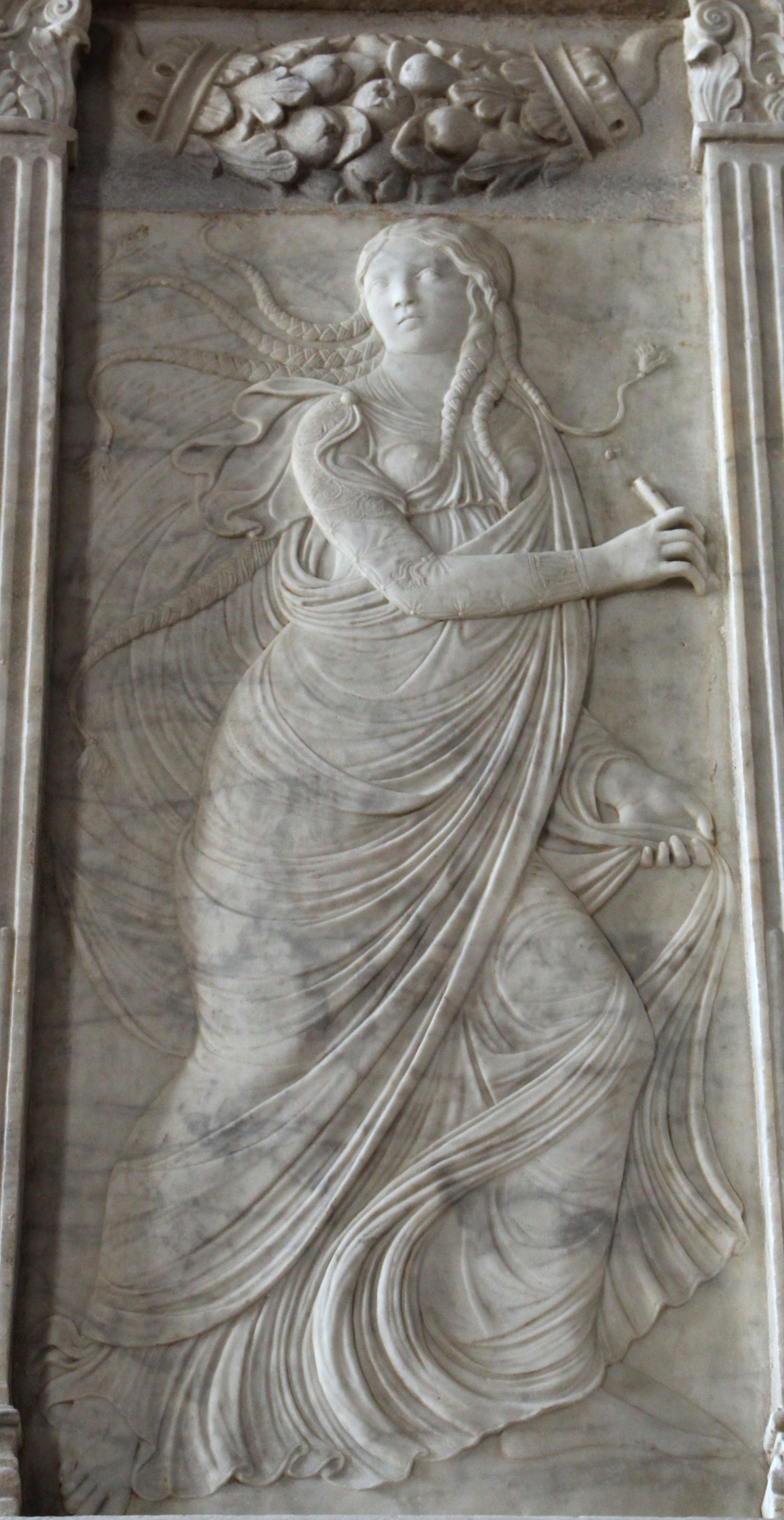
Philosophy, from the Tempio Malatestiano, Rimini

==== Lombardy ====
The Dukes of Milan were the rulers of one of the wealthiest Italian states in the latter half of the century, and like their northern counterparts, the Valois Dukes of Burgundy, were willing to spend large sums on the arts to promote their dynasties and states. In both cases these ambitions had failed by the end of the century.

Lombardy, at the foot of the Alps, was closer to northern influences than most of Italy, and French and German sculptors had already been brought in for the massive programme of sculpture at the essentially Gothic Milan Cathedral, which was to take centuries to complete. In contrast, the Certosa di Pavia, a large monastery intended as the dynastic burial place for the dukes, was built and decorated rapidly from the 1460s, with a second burst of activity in the 1490s, and was largely complete by the dynastic collapse at the end of the century. It thus represents, especially in the exteriors, the largest survival to show the courtly Lombard taste of this period, becoming "more delicate in scale, more exquisite in technique.

==== Crisis of the 1490s ====
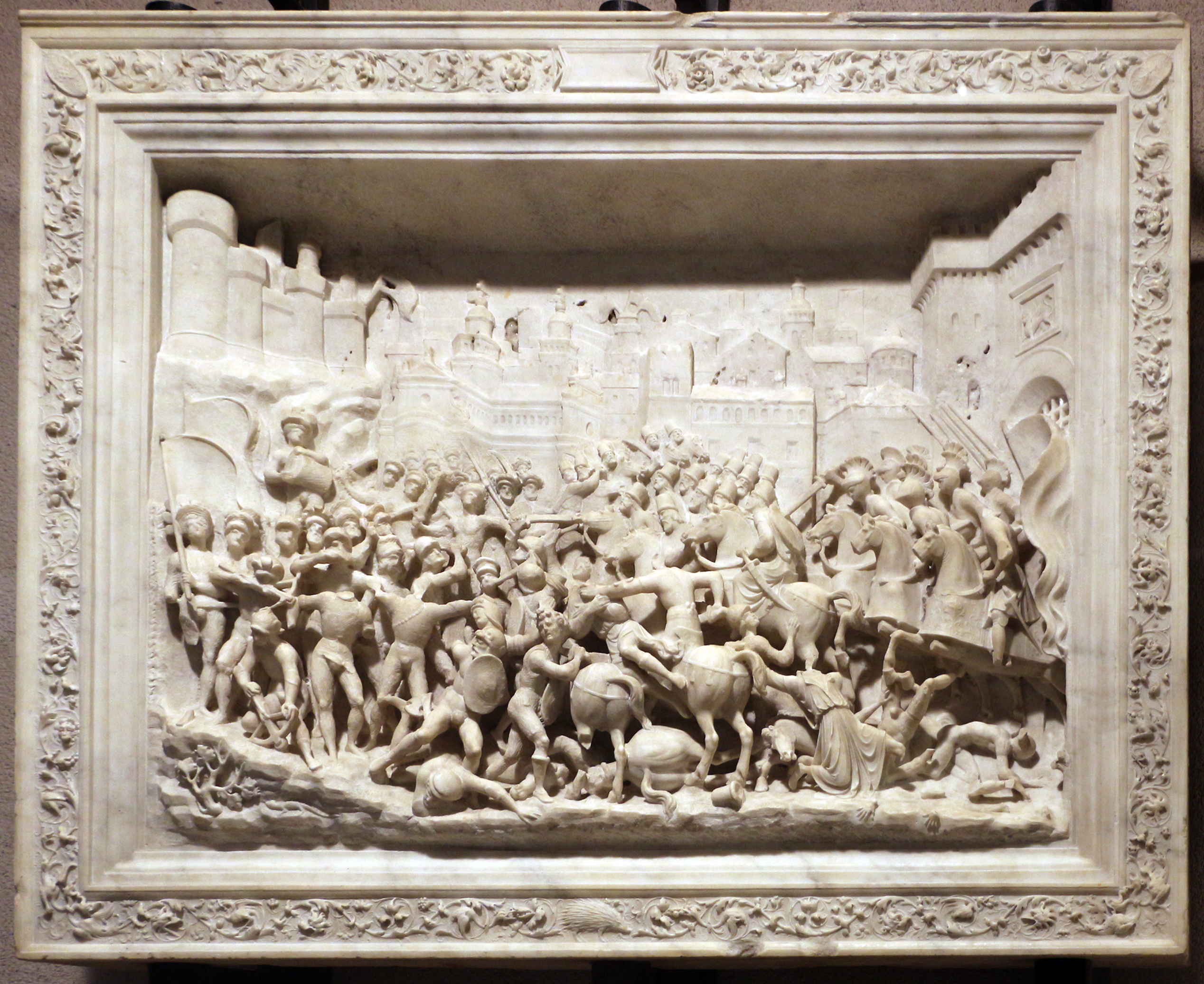
Relief for the tomb of Gaston de Foix by Agostino Busti

The end of the 15th century saw something of a crisis in sculpture, especially in Florence. After about 1485, the traditional sources of large commissions were drying up. Sculptural projects became smaller, often paid for by single individuals, above all the Medici.

The French invasion of Italy in 1494 destabilized Italy and began a series of wars that by 1559 led to the Spanish and Austrian Habsburgs dominating the country. The Medici were expelled from Florence in 1494, later to return, and Ludovico Duke of Milan also fell in 1499. Many artists moved to avoid the fighting, including Michelangelo, who spent a year in Bologna. Leonardo's Sforza Horse was only one of the large projects abandoned in these years. The ambitious and stylistically advanced tomb of the French general Gaston of Foix, Duke of Nemours (d. 1512) by Agostino Busti was abandoned when the French were expelled from Milan. The figures and some reliefs completed are in Milan, and other reliefs in Turin, with a drawing of the intended design, and casts of most parts, in London.

=== 16th century ===
==== Michelangelo ====
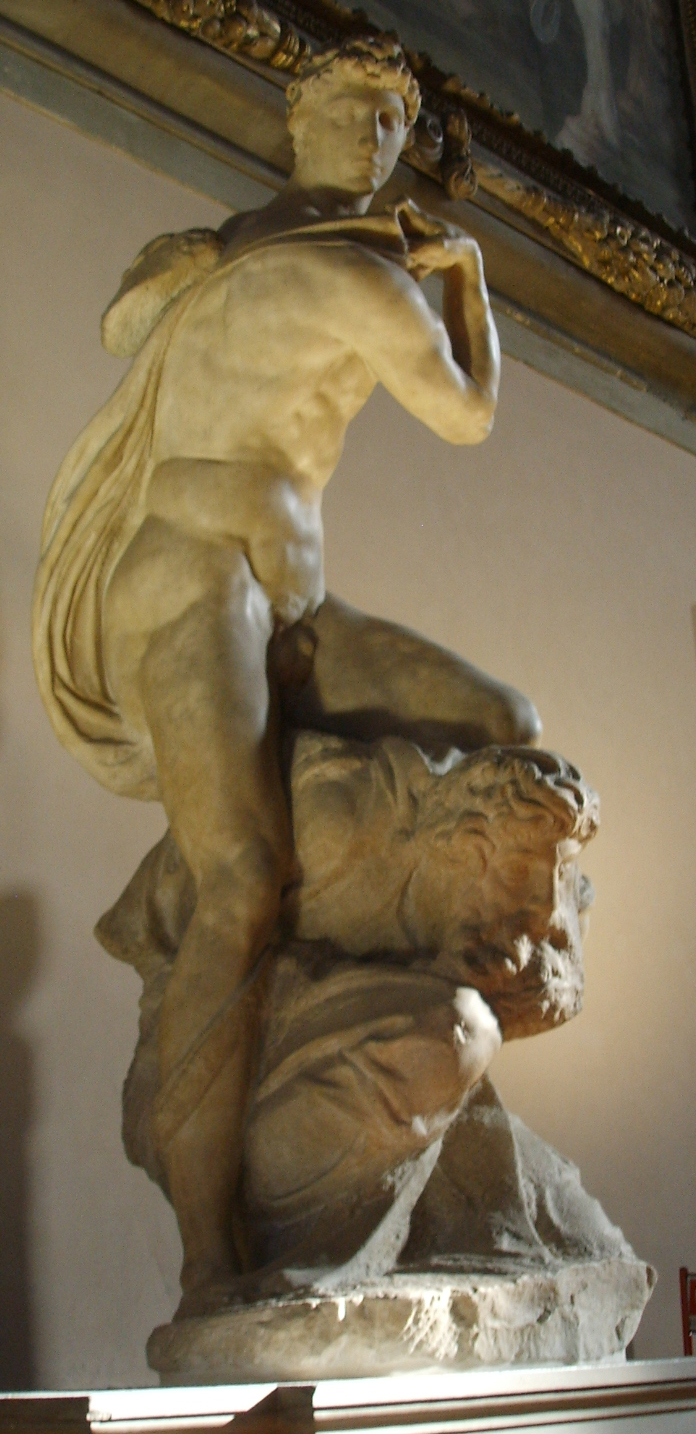
Victory, intended for the Tomb of Pope Julius II

The 1490s saw the emergence of Michelangelo as an exceptional talent, culminating in his Pietà, begun in 1498. At the start of the next century, he began his David. This "established Michelangelo's reputation ... all over Italy and even further afield", and remains his most famous sculpture. After this, sculptors of large works had to react to the enormous force of Michelangelo's figures. In 1504 Michelangelo received the first of the enormous painting commissions, for the Battle of Cascina (never completed), that were to take him away from sculpture for much of his career, and leave many sculptural projects unfinished. But it is a common if "mistaken theory" that this was a deliberate preference; instead it was caused by his perfectionism, refusal to delegate to assistants, and inability to cope with the multiple demands by his powerful patrons. A large bronze figure of Pope Julius II for Bologna was also destroyed in 1511 by the city.

Michelangelo's unique technique of carving statues was to initially carve into only one face of the block, rather than have an assistant get to the rough dimensions of the figure on all sides, as other sculptors did. As he progressed and side views began to emerge, he would start carving into the sides of the block. This technique gave him "scope for continual alterations and revisions of the contours, and even the positions", of all the parts not yet reached. But it required his full concentration throughout the carving process, and effectively ruled out the use of assistants, except for finishing stages such as polishing. His several unfinished sculptures demonstrate the technique, but also show the excessive demands the technique put on him.

Michelangelo was first asked by the Pope to create the Tomb of Pope Julius II in 1505, and set about choosing the marble, taking several months. But from 1508 to 1512 he was diverted into painting the Sistine Chapel ceiling. Originally the tomb had been planned as a free-standing pyramidal structure with many figures, but after the pope's death in 1513, a new contract was signed specifying that it stood against a wall. Work continued "spasmodically" until 1545, when "that miserable fragment that we have of the original scheme", with Moses and two other statues by him, was installed in San Pietro in Vincoli, as St Peter's was a building site. Other pieces are elsewhere, most unfinished. The young male nude Victory, with a twisting Figura serpentinata, which he left in his studio in Florence, was very influential on younger sculptors there. By contrast, his four "unfinished slaves", now in the Louvre, "were not treated with the possibly exaggerated reverence in which they are now held", but placed in the grotto in the Boboli Gardens.

His Medici Chapel, first planned in 1520, had a somewhat similar history, but what was eventually installed (by Tribolo in 1545) makes a far more satisfying ensemble, "one of the most celebrated complexes of sculpture in the world".

==== Mannerist and Late Renaissance sculpture ====
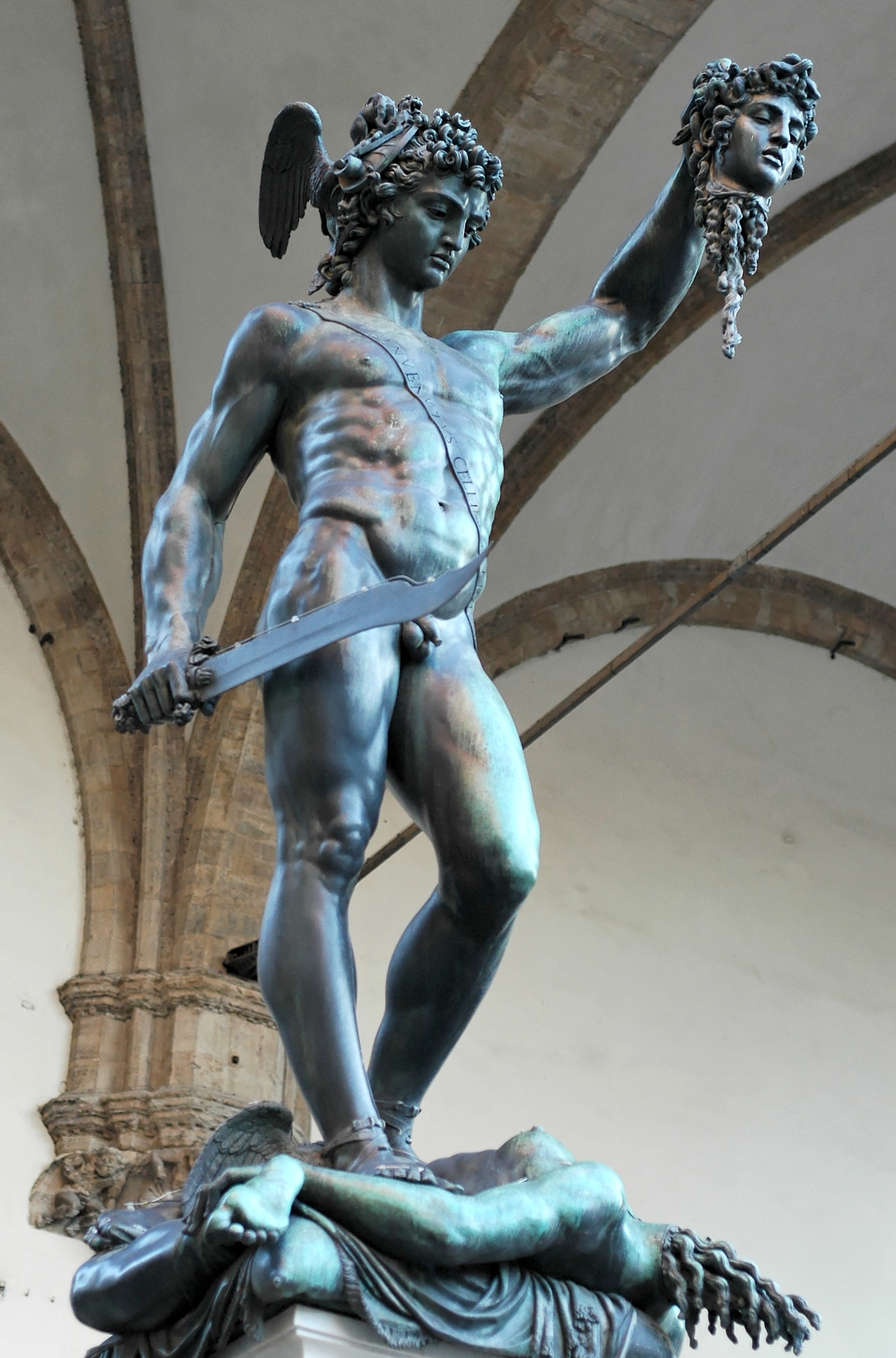
Benvenuto Cellini, Perseus with the Head of Medusa, 1545–1554

Baccio Bandinelli, who according to Vasari was obsessed by rivalry with both the slightly older Michelangelo and the slightly younger Cellini, was given the very politicized commission for Hercules and Cacus in the Piazza della Signoria, using a block of marble originally assigned to Michelangelo. At the time and subsequently it has been seen as a failed attempt to emulate Michelangelo; Cellini described the hero's physique as resembling "a sack of melons", and writers of hostile verses were imprisoned. Nevertheless, the Medici stuck by him, in the absence of Michelangelo in Rome, and he received most of the major commissions in Florence for several decades, despite (like Michelangelo) having a poor record of completing works.

Florentine sculptors who tried to reconcile the influences of Michelangelo and Mannerism included Niccolò Tribolo and his pupil Pierino da Vinci (the nephew of Leonardo). Tribolo's career got diverted into managing the water supply of the city and other engineering work, and some of his best later works are fountains for Medici gardens. Pierino was extremely talented, but died at 24. As well as statues, he developed a very effective Mannerist relief style, something that had eluded Cellini, and in which he had no successors.

Benvenuto Cellini trained as a goldsmith in Florence and mostly worked in metal, though learned how to carve marble very well. Thanks to his autobiography (which was only found in the 18th century) we know more about him than any other sculptor of the period. His undoubted masterpiece is Perseus with the Head of Medusa, 1545–1554, perhaps always intended for its current prominent position in the Loggia dei Lanzi. It "has the elegant, effortless poise that was the hallmark of Mannerist art".

Bartolomeo Ammannati was a talented sculptor, not best represented by his most prominent work, the central figure of the Fountain of Neptune, Florence, where he took over, after a competition, a block begun by Bandinelli. In later life, under the influence of the Counter-Reformation, he turned against nudity in public sculpture, and ceased work. Vincenzo Danti, who also entered the Neptune competition, found he could not compete in Florence with Giambologna, and returned to his native Perugia as city architect, and professor at the new academy.

The Florentine Jacopo Sansovino was initially a sculptor. He was working in Rome, but after the Sack in 1528 left for Venice, where he remained. He is mainly remembered as the most important architect of the period there, and it is not clear how much of the sculpture on his buildings he executed himself. He worked closely with Alessandro Vittoria, who is regarded as the most important Venetian sculptor. His rather severe portrait busts suited Venetian taste.

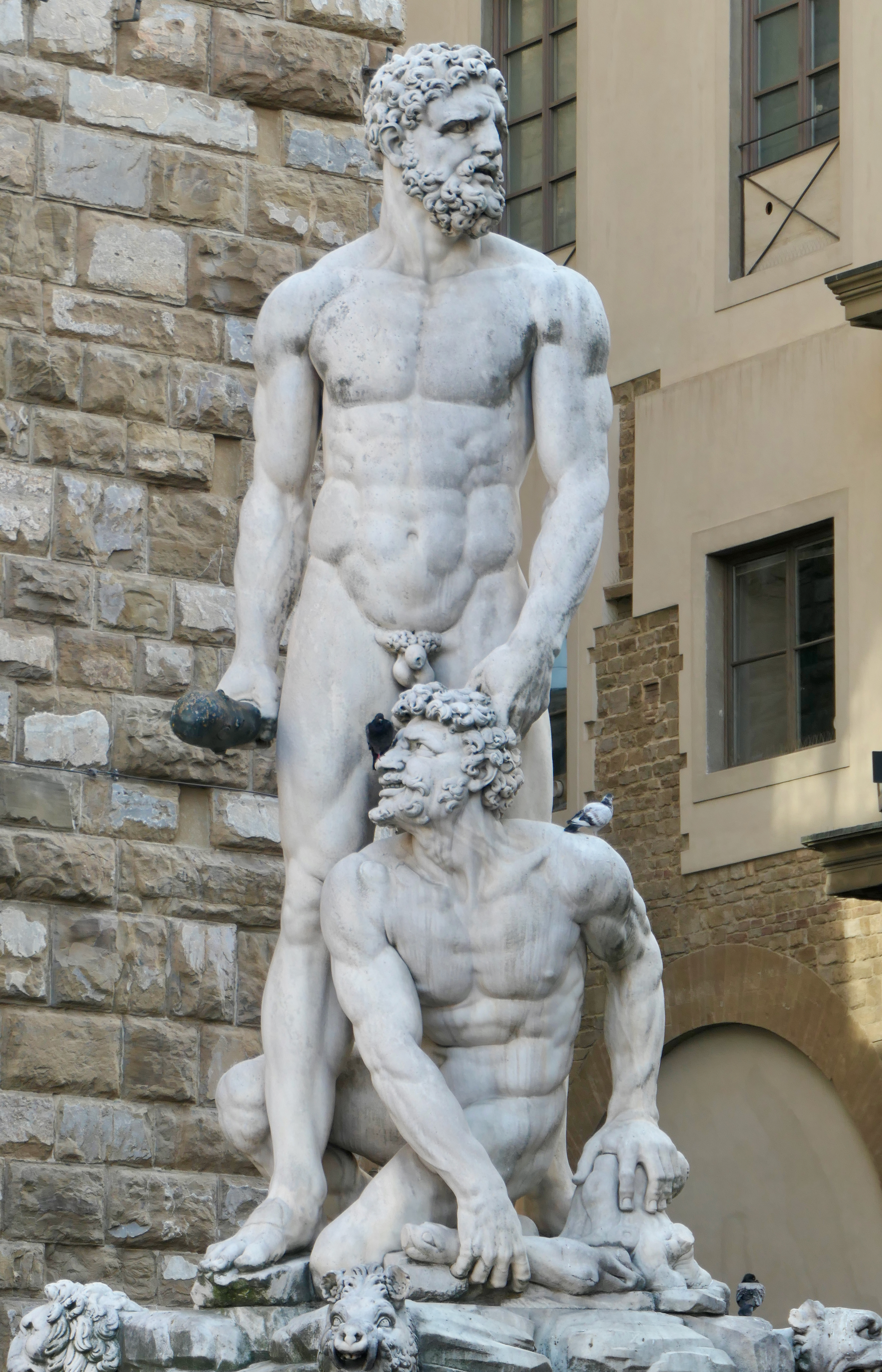
Hercules and Cacus, Baccio Bandinelli, Piazza della Signoria, Florence

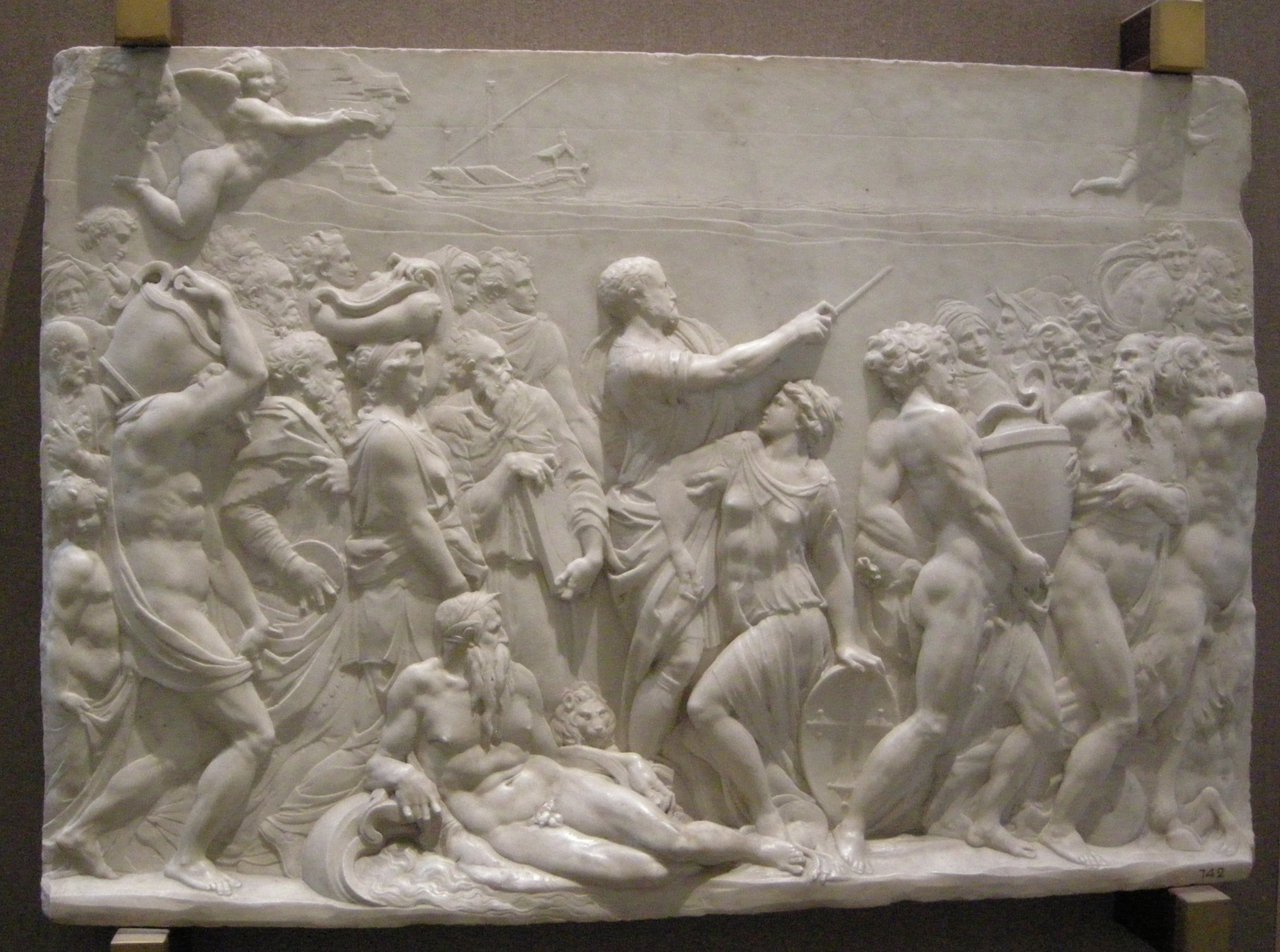
Restoration of Pisa by Cosimo I de' Medici, by Pierino da Vinci

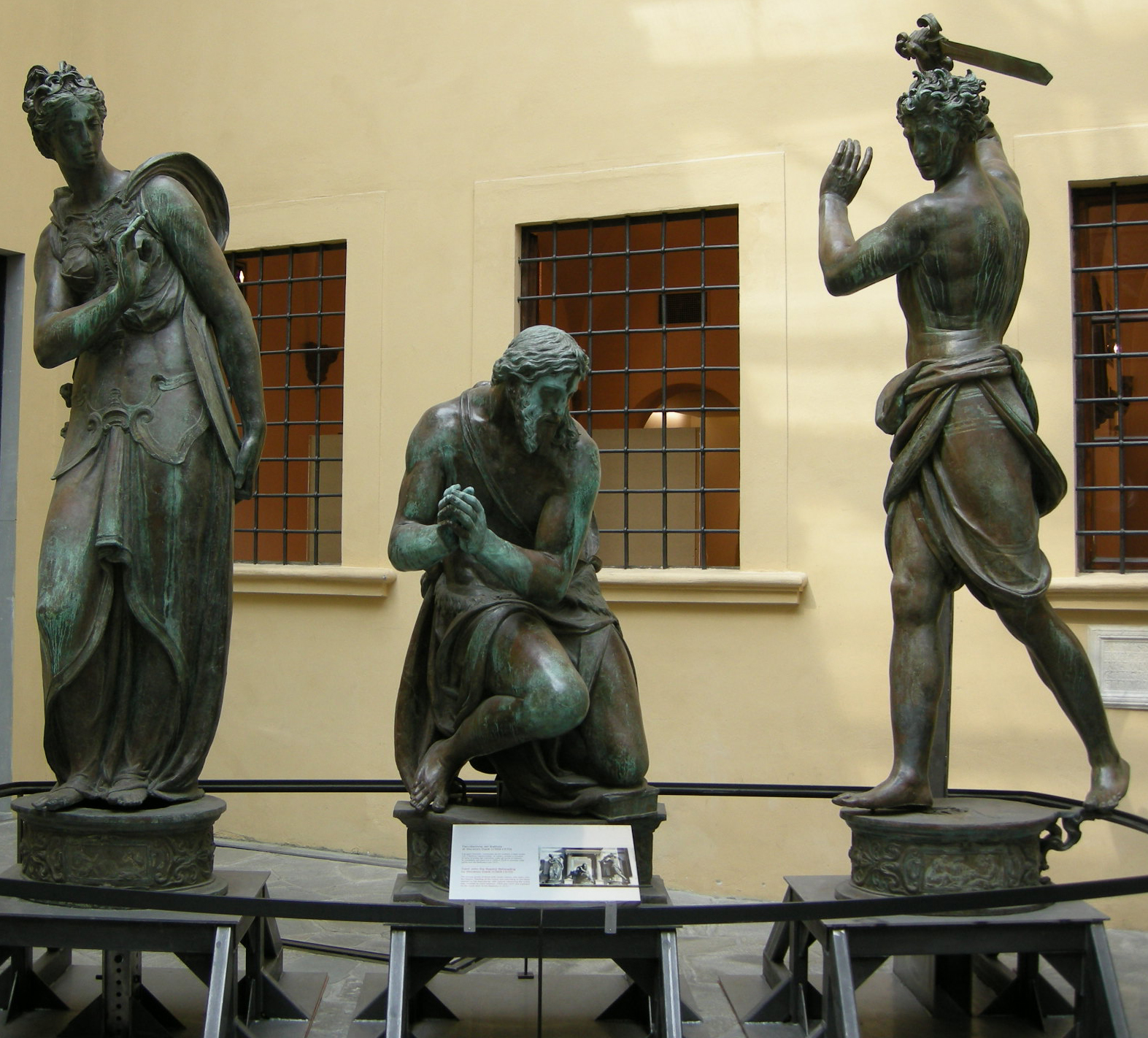
Vincenzo Danti, Beheading of John the Baptist, 1570s

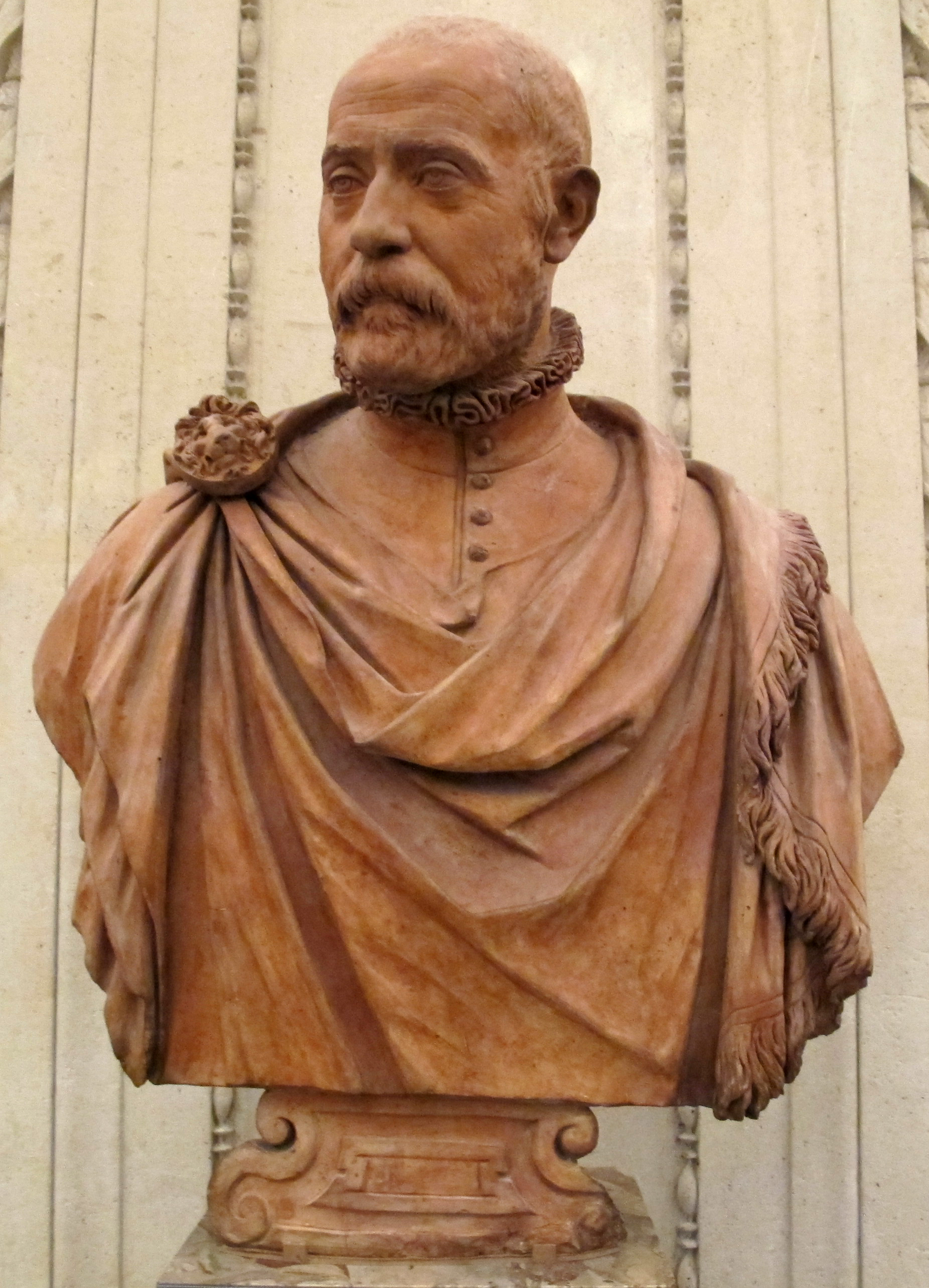
Alessandro Vittoria, Bust of a Venetian patrician, 1570-1600

==== Giambologna ====
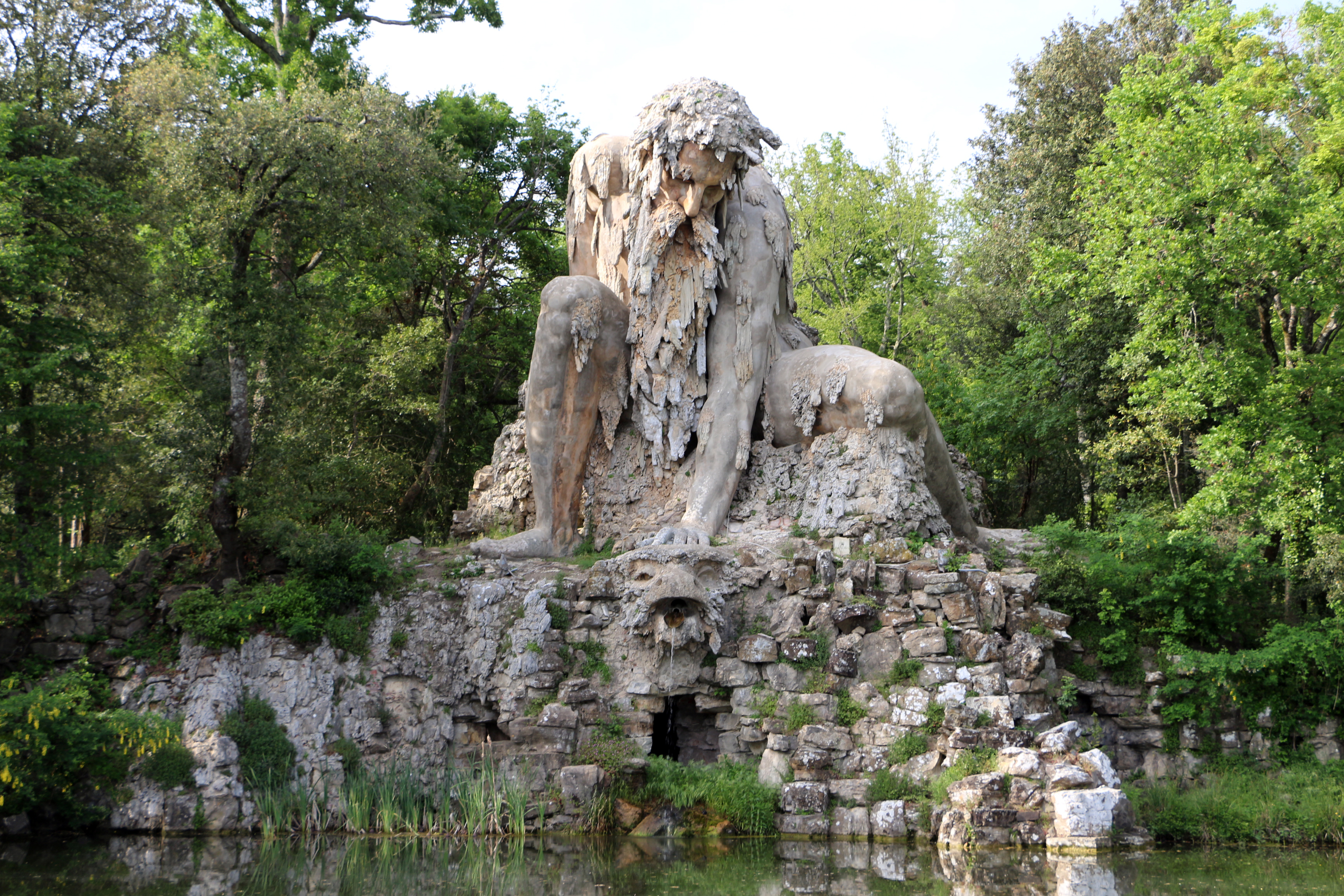
Apennine Colossus, 1580s, Villa di Pratolino

Known as Jean de Boulogne at home in Douai, Flanders (now in France), Giambologna trained with a local sculptor who had been to Italy. At 21 he spent two years in Rome, and returning north in 1557 found a patron in Florence, who introduced him to the court. His entry for the Florence Neptune competition in 1560 was not successful, but probably caused the authorities at Bologna to invite him to do their Fountain of Neptune, Bologna. Completed in 1566, this was his largest commission to date. He was briefly recalled from Bologna in 1565 to make temporary decorations for a Medici wedding. He produced a full-size modello in gesso (plaster) of Florence triumphing over Pisa, which was displayed at the wedding. The marble version was done later, perhaps by an assistant. This work introduces his interest in "the problem of uniting two figures in an action group", which many later works continue.

As his career developed, he proved a capable manager of a large workshop, and an efficient manager of commissions, allowing his large output, mostly in bronze. He always worked from modelli which his workshop often repeated in different sizes. His elegant twisting figures climax in his marble Rape of the Sabine (1579–85, a title he adopted after the work was finished, from a friend's suggestion), which is designed to be equally satisfying viewed from any angle, as was his earlier Mercury, balanced on one foot (there are four versions).

Many of his larger statues were originally for gardens, often as the centrepiece of a fountain. The huge Apennine Colossus (1580s) is in the gardens of the Villa di Pratolino, a classic Mannerist garden full of sculpture, grottos, and automata, including ones that squirted water on visitors. Partly carved into a rock face, it is too large to move to a museum, so remains in place. By other artists, the Bomarzo Monsters, mostly natural outcrops of rock fantastically carved, and the gardens of the Villa d'Este at Tivoli, Lazio are other showpieces of Mannerist garden sculpture, both much better preserved than the rest of the Villa di Pratolino.

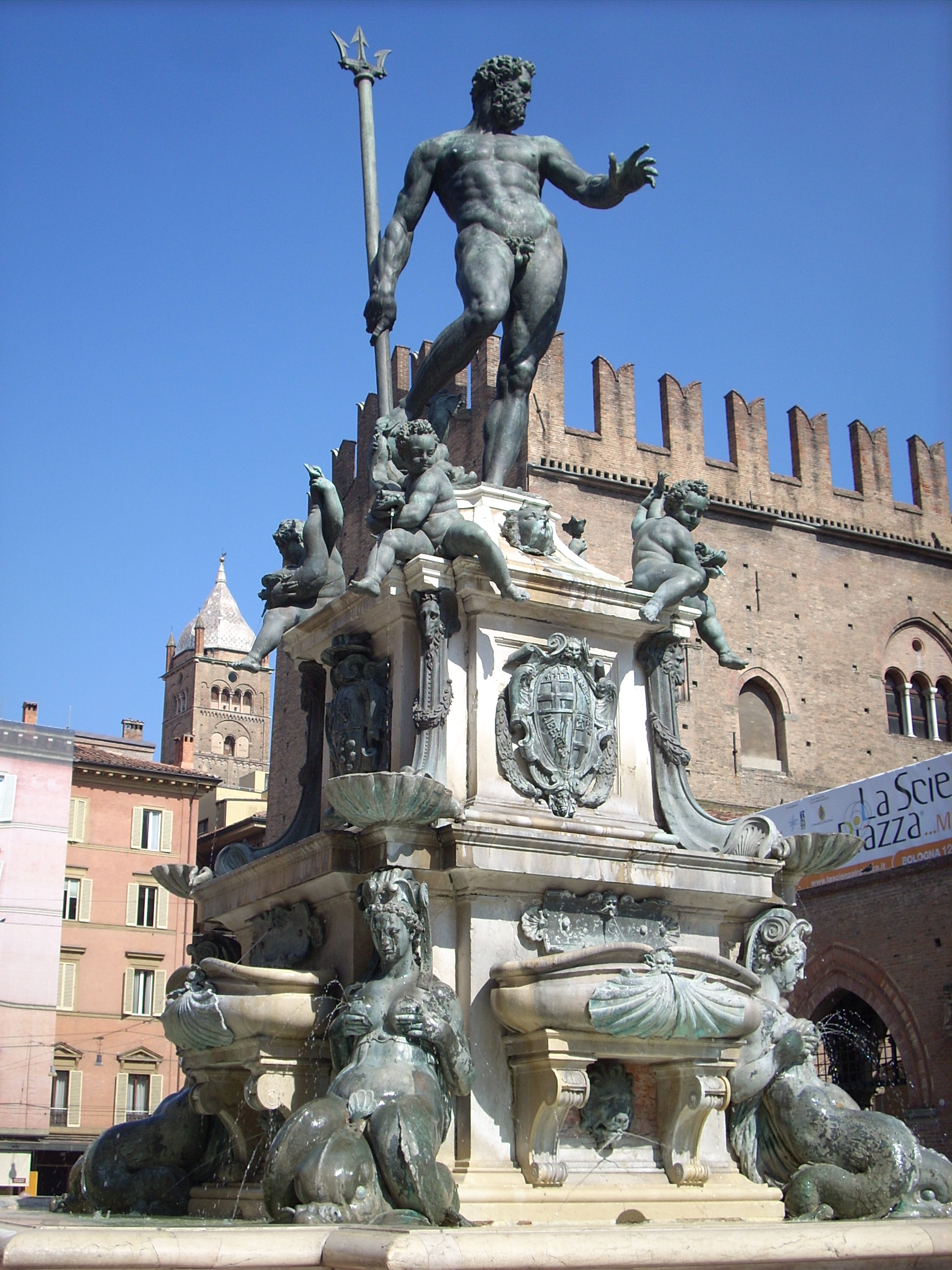
Fountain of Neptune, Bologna, 1553–56

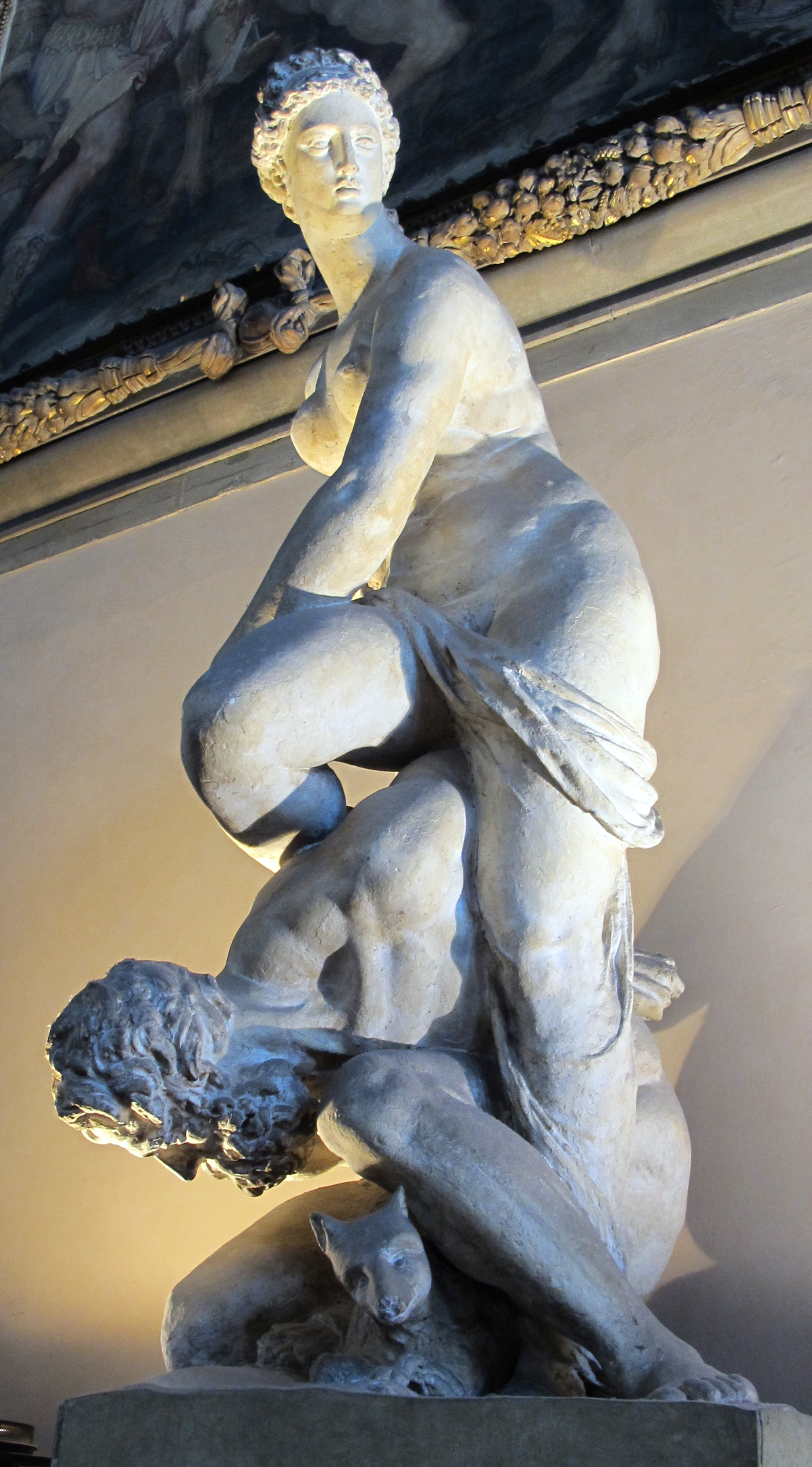
Florence Triumphant over Pisa, modello in gesso (plaster), for a Medici wedding in 1565

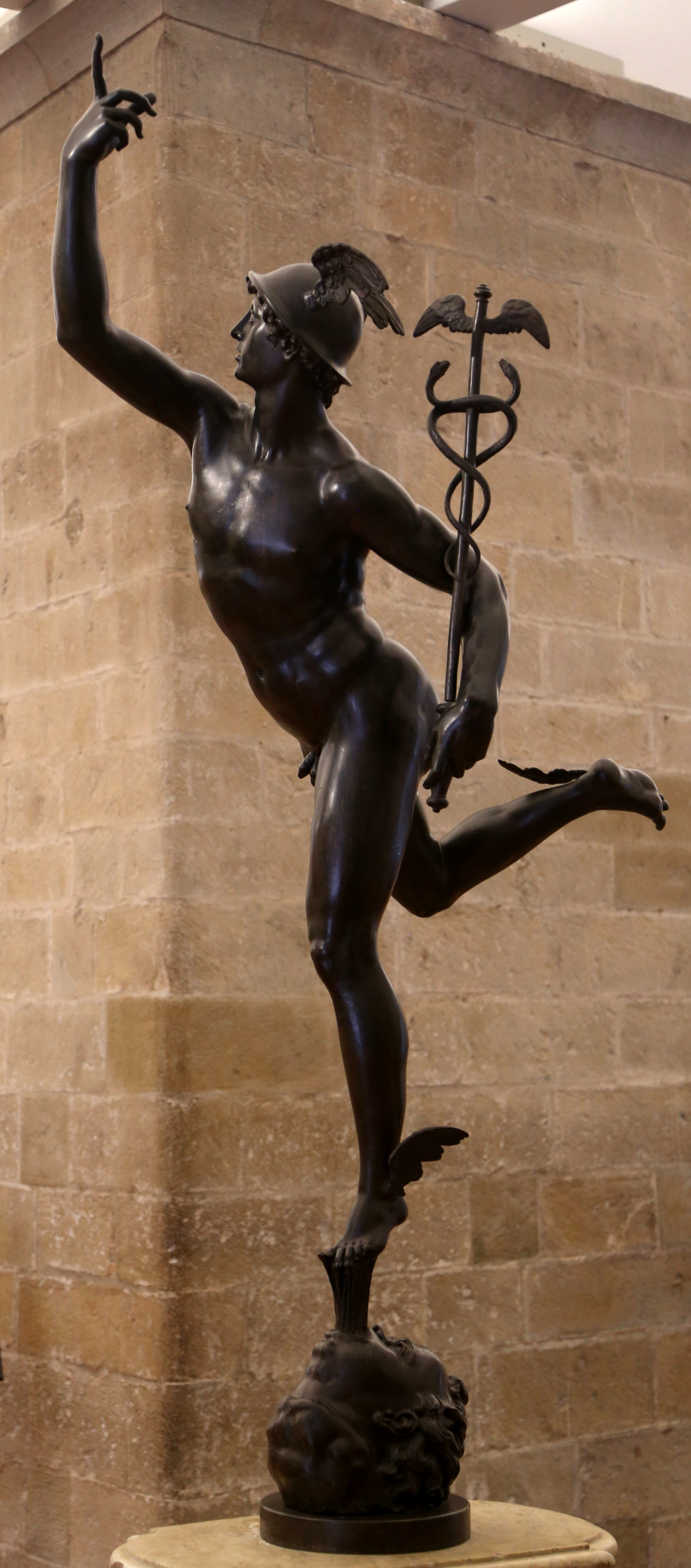
Large bronze version of Mercury (Bargello)

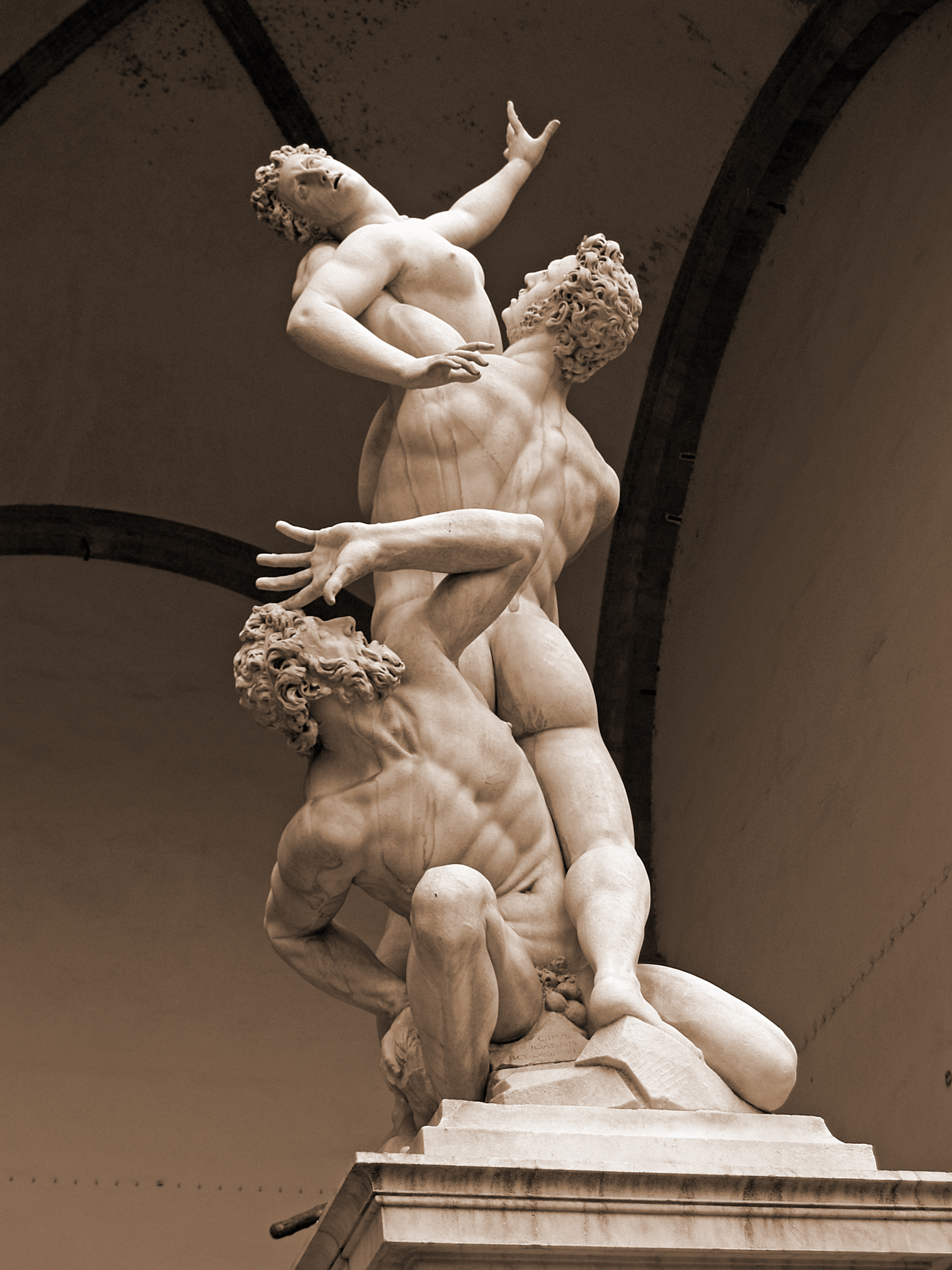
Rape of the Sabine, 1579–85

== Italians abroad ==
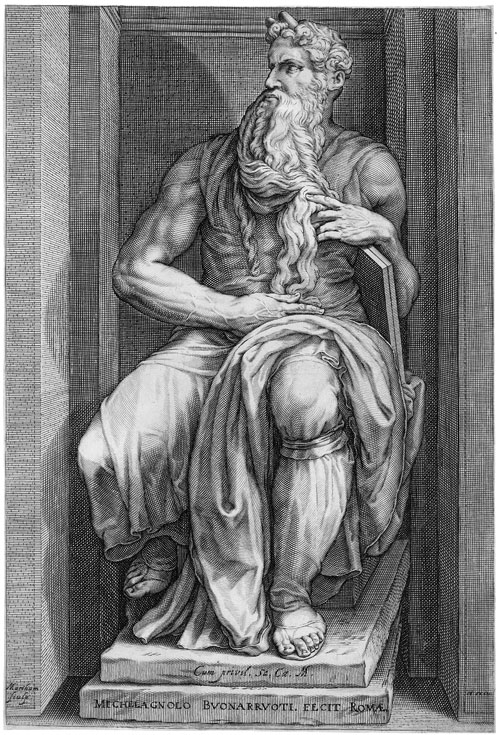
Reproductive engraving by Jacob Matham, of Moses, by Michelangelo, 1593

By the end of the period the reproductive print industry distributed print images of Italian works all over Europe; antiquities and paintings were the most popular subjects, but many Renaissance sculptures were copied. But before about 1530 the main exposure of foreigners to Italian Renaissance art was physical movements of Italian artists or works abroad, or foreign visitors to Italy. Many foreign artists, especially Netherlandish ones, made extended visits to Italy, usually early in their careers, and took back what they had learned back to their native countries. For example, Giambologna's teacher Jacques Du Brœucq is thought to have spent some five years in Italy, and adopted an Italianate style once back in Antwerp. After 1550 the consolidation of much of Europe under the Habsburgs gave rise to "a remarkable internationality of decorative style", with artists, or their drawings, prints and plaquettes, spreading designs around Europe, with Italy the usual point of origin.

Periods working abroad by Italians often had decisive effects on the future sculpture of the country visited, providing models for local artists; this was especially the case in France. Though the Italian Wars begun in 1494 were a disaster for Italy they resulted in an "Italian cultural domination of Europe ... that compensated artistically for the political and military subjection of Italy". By the end of the period tourism, led by interest in Italian art, was already becoming economically significant, for Florence, Venice and Rome in particular.

Portable objects such as medals and small bronzes reached the rest of Europe, and inspired local imitations. At the end of the period the small bronzes of Giambologna and his workshop (and his imitators) were a small industry largely for export. Giambologna himself, as the leading sculptor of the later 16th century, received many invitations to work at foreign courts, which the Medici Grand Dukes would not allow him to accept. Leading artists were sometimes wary of accepting foreign invitations, especially from the Habsburgs, as they usually needed the consent of the ruler to leave again.

The extended periods working outside Italy of Torrigiano and Lariana have been noted above. As with other emigres, when abroad they worked mostly for court circles with advanced taste. The artists of the Tudor court were mostly from the Netherlands, though some like the first English medallist, Steven van Herwijck, had worked in Italy. The few Italian sculptors included Torrigiano and probably the terracotta specialist Guido Mazzoni, who certainly spent some years after 1495 in France. After the English Reformation visitors were nearly all portrait-painters, but during the reign of Mary I of England the Habsburg's medallist and jeweller Jacopo da Trezzo visited.

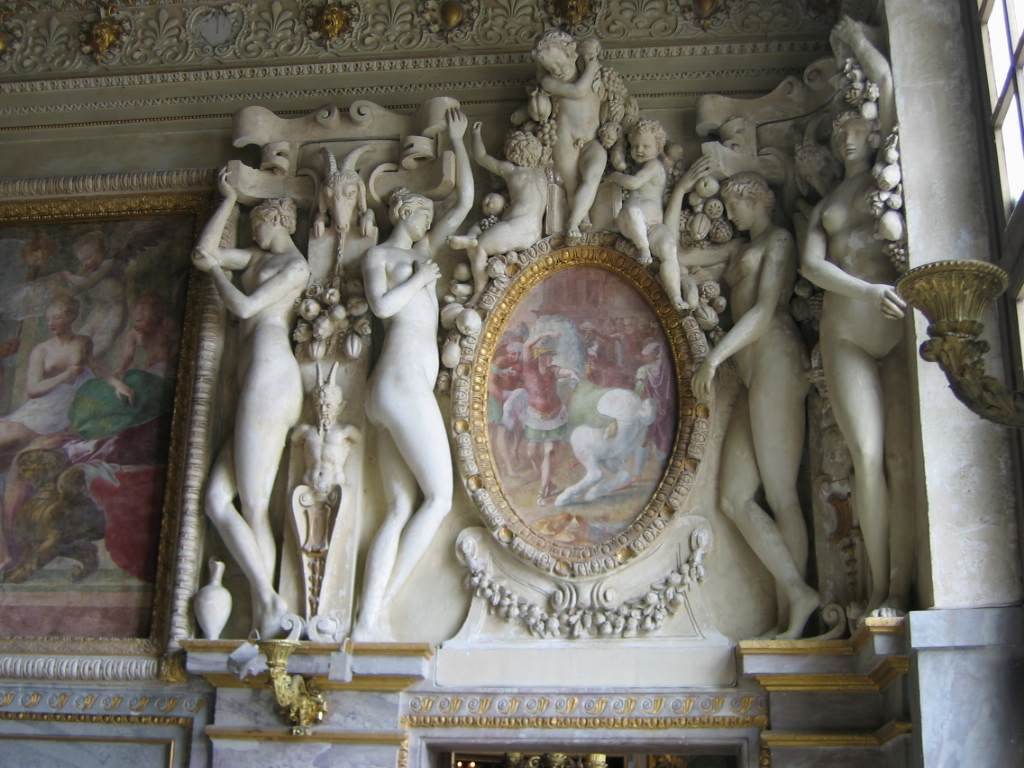
Stucco overdoor at Fontainebleau, probably designed by Primaticcio, who painted the oval inset

The First School of Fontainebleau was a painter-led group of Italians invited to France by King François I to come to France, where they began to decorate the huge new Château de Fontainebleau, forming a virtual artists' colony in the forest in the 1530s. Their large numbers of elegant Mannerist reliefs in stucco, often of tall, slim, nude females, "extravagantly unclassical" according to Kenneth Clark, were highly influential on French Northern Mannerist style; some were shown in the etchings the group produced.

Benevenuto Cellini spent 1540–45 in France, where he produced his gold salt (see above) and a large bronze relief Nymph of Fontainebleau (1542, now Louvre) in what was becoming known as the "French style". He was probably influenced by the Fontainebleau stuccos.

Domenico Fancelli (1469–1519) produced several tomb effigies for Spanish royalty and the important Mendoza family, but worked in Carrara, visiting Spain briefly "to install his work and sign new contracts". In a similar way, Leone Leoni stayed in Milan after he was appointed to run the imperial mint for the Habsburgs, but his son Pompeo moved to Spain, where he finished and installed his father's larger works, and produced his own.

Andrea Sansovino spent much of 1491 to 1501 working in Portugal for King Manuel I of Portugal. Jacopo Caraglio, who presumably had trained as a goldsmith, was a significant engraver at the start of Roman Mannerism, to designs by Rosso Fiorentino and others. One of many artists who fled Rome after the Sack in 1527, and after some years in Venice, he was at the Polish court by 1539, where he spent the rest of his career as court goldsmith, including carving engraved gem cameo portraits and modelling medals of the royal family. Giovanni Maria Mosca also settled in Poland. The rather obscure Florentine sculptor named Gregorio di Lorenzo travelled to Hungary in the late 15th century to work for the court. King Matthias Corvinus (r. 1464–1490) had been sent two reliefs by Verrocchio as a diplomatic gift by Lorenzo de' Medici. Giovanni Dalmata also went to work for King Matthias in 1481.
