= DiPietro =

DiPietro is an English surname of Italian origin. Notable people with the surname include:

- Ashley DiPietro (born 1985), American prostitute connected to the Eliot Spitzer prostitution scandal
- Bob DiPietro (1927–2012), American baseball player
- David DiPietro (born 1960), American politician
- Joseph A. DiPietro (born 1951), President of the University of Tennessee
- Joe DiPietro (born 1961), American playwright and author
- Luisa DiPietro (born 1954), American academic scientist
- Michael DiPietro (born 1999), Canadian junior ice hockey goaltender
- Paul DiPietro (born 1970), Canadian-born Swiss professional ice hockey player
- Rebecca DiPietro (born 1979), American model and former professional wrestling personality
- Rick DiPietro (born 1981), American ice hockey goalie
- Rocky Dipietro (born 1956), Canadian Football League player
- Santo DiPietro (1934–2016), American politician

== See also ==
- di Pietro
