= Saint Louis of Toulouse (Donatello) =

Sculpture by Donatello

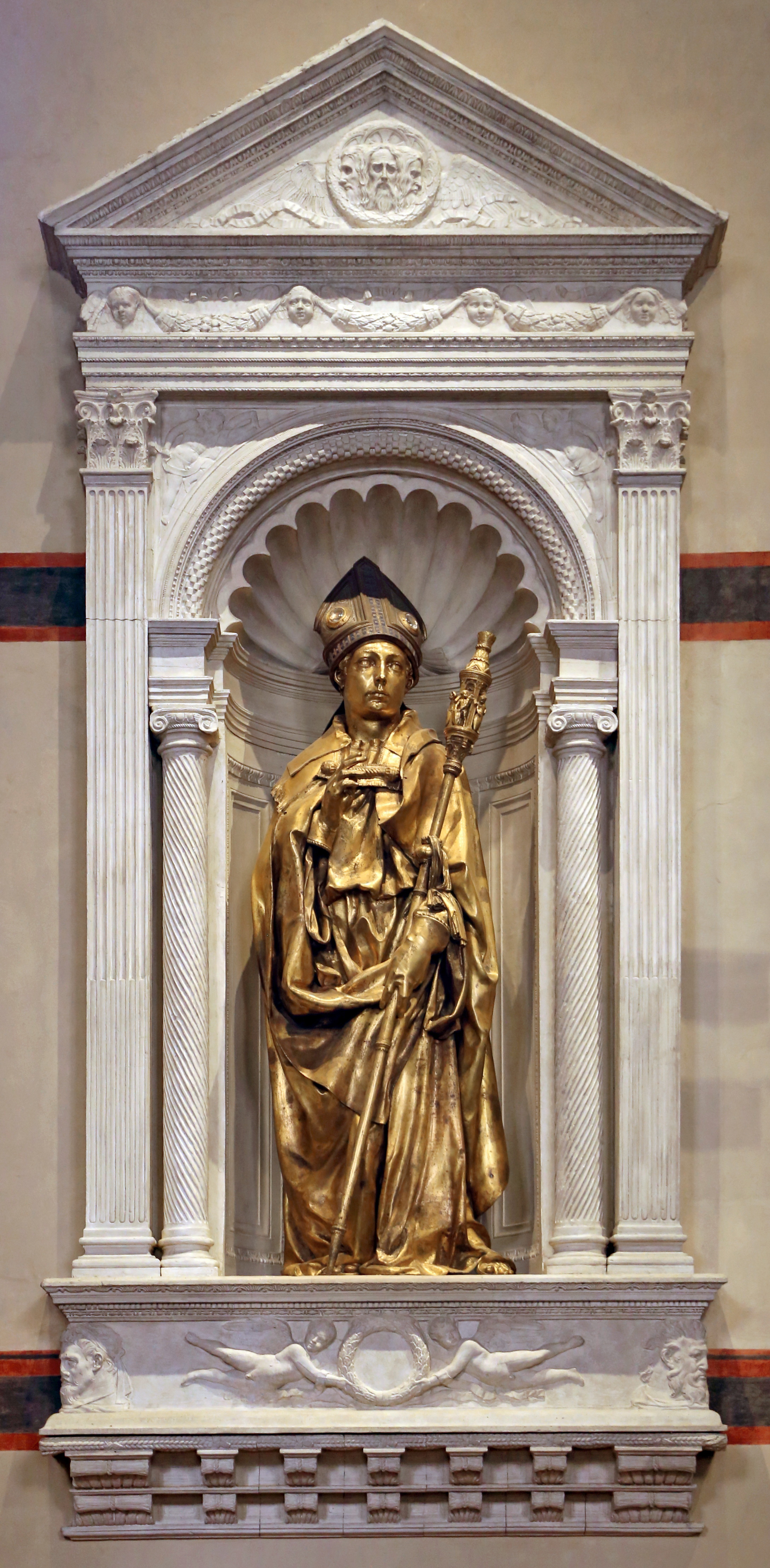
- Artist: Donatello
- Year: 1423–1425
- Medium: Gilded bronze
- Dimensions: 2.66 m × 0.85 m (105 in × 33 in)
- Location: Museo di Santa Croce, Florence

Saint Louis of Toulouse is a gilded bronze sculpture of Louis of Toulouse by Donatello with a marble niche all'antica on the facade of Orsanmichele, executed in 1423–1425. It is now in the refectory of the Museo di Santa Croce in Florence.

The statue was commissioned by the Parte Guelfa for their external niche at the centre of the east facade of Orsanmichele facing via de' Calzaiuoli. Their patron saint (canonized in 1317) had given up his crown for the religious life, an idea that favorably symbolized the Guelphs' belief in the Papacy. They backed the papal party against the Holy Roman Emperor in the Investiture Controversy and later conflicts.

== Background ==
The Saint Louis of Toulouse was Donatello's earliest bronze sculpture, that we know of, not only of this size. It measures 2.26 m high with a widest diameter of about 0.75 m and 0.85 m at the bottom. An (above) life-sized bronze statue hadn't been produced since late-antiquity and the knowledge was almost lost, at least in Tuscany. For the first Baptistry door (1330–1336) modeled after its sole predecessor, Bonanno Pisano's doors for Pisa Cathedral from the end of the 12th century, a hundred and fifty years later Andrea Pisano needed the help of bronze-casters from Venice, where the late-antique/byzantine tradition and the knowledge about casting bigger pieces had been preserved. At the turn of the 15th century, the second door for the Florence Baptistry then marked a new beginning. For Lorenzo Ghiberti, a trained goldsmith, it was a huge challenge, and it took him 20 years (1403–1424), before he immediately took on the commission for the third door.

But in 1412 Ghiberti also had the chance to create the first life-size bronze figure since antiquity, his Saint John the Baptist (finished by 1416). No surprise that it also was commissioned for one of the niches of Orsanmichele again by one of the most wealthiest guilds in Florence, the Arte di Calimala, who were responsible for the Baptistery and for the commission of its bronze doors to Ghiberti. Subsequently the Arte del Cambio and the Arte della Lana were evenly keen to promote their prestige and show their wealth by commissioning also bronze statues of their patron saints for the designated niches at Orsanmichele, and both asked Ghiberti to do it. The Bankers Guild even demanded explicitly that their Saint Matthew should be taller than the Baptist of the Calimala. Ghiberti executed the Saint Matthew between 1419–1422, the Saint Stephen for the Arte della Lana in 1427–1428, replacing an earlier, less prestigious marble figure of their patron saint.

== The statue and its niche at Orsanmichele ==
Completed in 1425 the Saint Louis of Toulouse was then the third monumental bronze statue since several centuries, with Donatello also designing its niche according to Vasari, but in 1459 the niche was instead sold to the Tribunale della Mercanzia and used for their commission of the Christ and St. Thomas.

== At Santa Croce ==
Donatello was still alive when due to political pressure the Parte Guelfa had to give up their prestigious representational space at Orsanmichele, the economical centre of Florence. The statue was instead taken to "the next best location" (Janson), Santa Croce, which their patron saint Louis of Anjou had visited and therefore the Guelphs were affiliated with. It was placed in a niche above the central portal of the facade, in which the coat of arms of the Parte Guelfa were formerly displayed. Aesthetically the niche was "a poor choice", it was too high up, but it also was too shallow for the statue. Today the statues's hollow shell is open on its back, and it is believed that parts of the drapery on the back were taken off the figure to make it fit into its new space. An indicator for this to be true is the fact that the statue doesn't sustain itself and tilts forwards so it has to be held by additional support that is not original.

== Recent history ==
When the 19th-century facade was built (in 1860) the sculpture was put into store and then into the museum. In 1943 the Orsanmichele sculptures and others were placed in secure storage for the duration of the war. After the war the Saint Louis was briefly placed in then the supposedly original niche at Orsanmichele, and it was first proven that it was indeed Donatello's sculpture for the Guelphs.

== Bibliography ==
- Horst W. Janson (1957). The Sculpture of Donatello (2 Vol.). Princeton: Princeton University Press. pp. 45–56. Archive-URL of the 1963 edition in one volume with less images.
- Bonnie A. Bennett, David G. Wilkins (1984). Donatello. Oxford.
- Rolf C. Wirtz (1998). Donatello. Cologne: Könemann.
- Francesco Caglioti with Laura Cavazzini, Aldo Galli and Neville Rowley (2022). Donatello. The Renaissance. Venice: Marsilio Arte. pp. 38f, cat. 3.1, p. 144. ISBN 979-12-5463-006-8.
