= Di Pietro =

di Pietro or Di Pietro is an Italian surname. Notable people with the surname include:

14-15th Century Painters

- Angelo di Pietro da Siena (active 1447–1456), Italian Renaissance painter
- Cecco di Pietro (14th century), Italian painter of the Pisan School
- Cola di Pietro (active late 14th-century), Italian painter of the late Gothic style, active in the Marche and Umbria regions
- Innocenzo di Pietro Francucci da Imola (c.1494–1550), Italian painter
- Matteo di Pietro di Ser Bernardo (1435 or 1440-1507), Italian painter, active in Gualdo Tadino
- Michelangelo di Pietro (active 1490-1520), Italian painter and Master of the Lathrop Tondo
- Niccolò di Pietro (late 14th-early 15th century), italian Sienese School painter of Medieval art
- Niccolò di Pietro Gerini (c.1340–1414), Italian painter
- Nicola di Pietro (14th century), Italian painter
- Sano di Pietro (1406–1481), Italian painter

16th century and following

- Angelo Di Pietro (1828–1914), Italian cardinal
- Angelo Di Pietro (inventor) (born 1950), Italian engine designer
- Anthony Di Pietro (born 1969), Italian Australian businessman
- Antonio Di Pietro (born 1950), Italian politician
- Bruno Barros di Pietro (born 1982), Brazilian football defender
- Camillo di Pietro (1806–1884), Italian cardinal
- Filippo di Pietro Strozzi (1541-1582), Italian condottiero
- Giovani Battista di Pietro di Stefano Volponi (16th century), Italian painter
- Guido di Pietro (c.1395–1455), Italian painter
- Michele di Pietro (1747–1821), Italian cardinal
- Michele Di Pietro (born 1954), Italian former swimmer
- Niccolò di Pietro Lamberti (c. 1370–1451), Italian sculptor and architect
- Pasquale Di Pietro (born 1894, date of death unknown), Italian racing cyclist
- Paolo Andrea Di Pietro (born 1986), Italian opera singer
- Rick DiPietro (born 1981), American ice hockey player
- Rocco Di Pietro (born 1949), Italian-American composer
- Salvatore di Pietro (1830–1898), Italian Roman Catholic first Bishop and Vicar Apostolic of Belize
- Silvia Di Pietro (born 1993), Italian swimmer
