= Petrolini =

Petrolini is an Italian surname. Notable people with this surname include:

- Ettore Petrolini (1884–1936), Italian stage and film actor, playwright, screenwriter and novelist
- Vincenzo Petrolini (died 1606), Roman Catholic Bishop of Muro Lucano

== See also ==
- Petris (disambiguation)
