= Orsanmichele's St. James Tabernacle =

Coordinates: 43°46′14.10″N 11°15′17.76″E

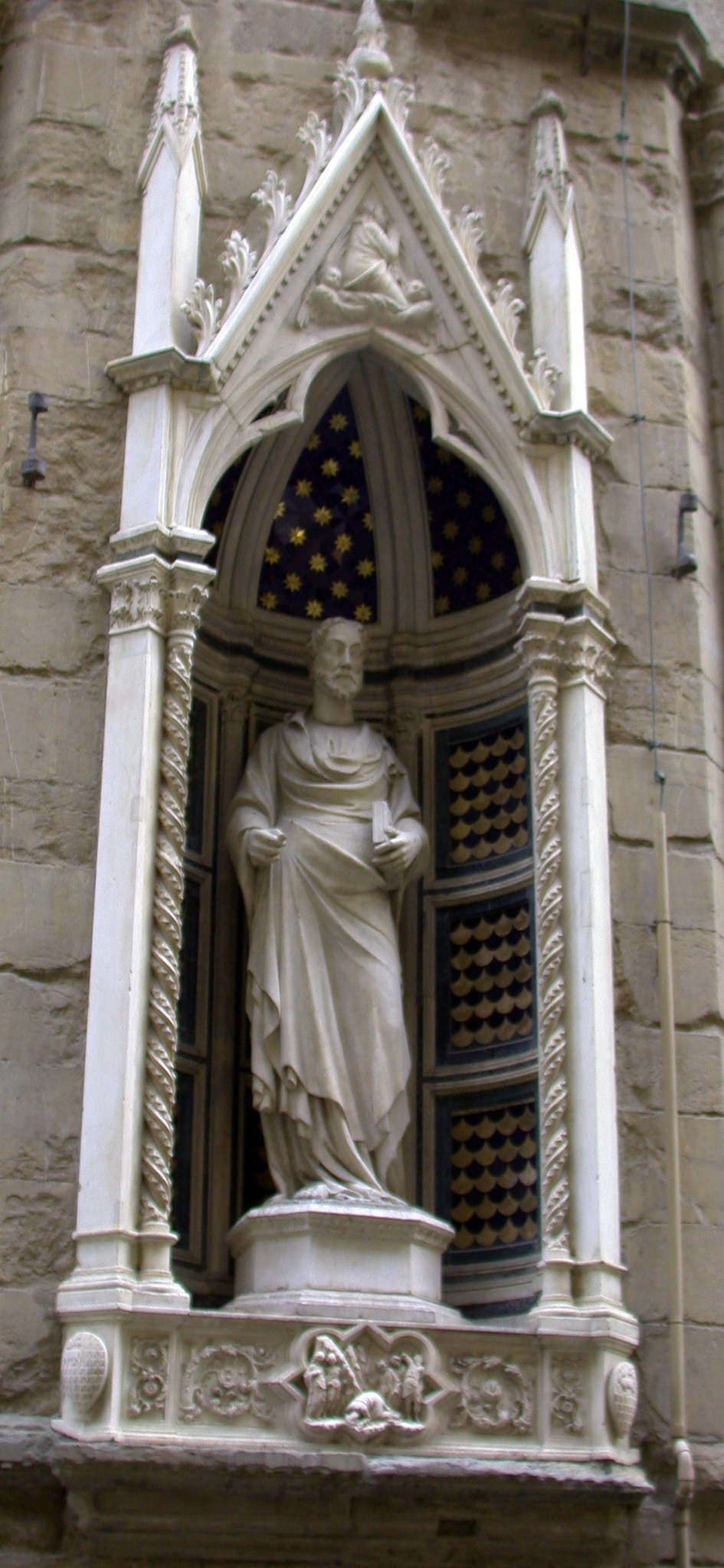
Reproduction statue of St James now on display

Orsanmichele's St. James the Major Tabernacle located on the southern façade of Orsanmichele, in Florence, is the tabernacle of The Guild of Furriers and Skinners (L’ Arte de Vaiai e Pellicciai). The statue of St. James the Major (c. 1420), by Niccolò di Piero Lamberti, once occupied the niche but is now housed in the Museum of Orsanmichele.

== Formal Analysis ==
Placed above the tabernacle is a tondo which displays frescoed remains of the Guild's emblem. Decorative cusps draw the eye upward toward the pointed tip of the gable. Still extant in the gable is a scene of The Soul of St. James Carried to Heaven by two Cherubim. St. James, kneels poised and praying upon his knees. His profile position juxtaposes with two cherubins that gaze outwards as they embrace him from below. Their well-articulated wings fall smoothly down their shoulders. Their rounded, idealized faces appear youthful. Rounded triangles converge in the interior dome of the niche. Twisted colonnades flank the niche and at its base, on either side are displayed the emblem of the Guild of Furriers and Skinners. Also at the base is a relief of The Beheading of St. James. Centrally located in the panel St. James is found fallen to his knees. His head, only partially severed from his neck, drapes forward onto the ground. Five figures surround him.

The niche itself no longer holds the statue of St. James the Major. The statue is instead on display in the Museum of Orsanmichele. St. James stands contrapposto with his right arm slightly drawn up. His left had holds the bible to his side. Although fully covered in drapery, the form of his lower body below the deep folds is detectable. His right thigh and knee become visible, creating the illusion that his robes are somewhat thin. They fall smoothly from his chest and gracefully onto the floor leaving only his bare toes visible. His head and face are idealized, resembling the classical philosopher style. He gazes forward in contemplation.

== The Guild of Furriers and Skinners ==
L’Arte de Vaiai e Pellicciai, or, the Guild of Furriers and Skinners, joined The Seven Greater Guilds (Le Arte Maggiori) in the early 12th century. Four of the Seven Greater Guilds of Florence were already in existence when the Guild of Furriers and Skinners came into the group. Mention of their incorporation dates to 1197. At the same time, the Guild of Judges and Notaries (Arte de Giudici e Notai), and the Guild of Doctors and Apothecaries (L’Arte de Medici e Degli Speziali), joined the existing four that consisted of The Calimala Guild (L’Arte e Universita de Marcanti di Calimala), The Guild of Wool (L’ Arte e Universita della Lana), The Guild of Bankers and Money-Changers (L’Arte del Cambio), and The Guild of Silk (L’Arte della Seta, or “Por Santa Maria). The Guild of Furriers and Skinners ranked seventh in the Guild Hierarchy and may have been chosen over other lesser guilds because of a more ancient lineage, a higher social grade or its significant industrial class. In 1266, it was fully established with the Guild’s arms, Consuls and other Officers.

== Sources ==
- Grifton, Paola, Francesca Nannelli, Claudio Pisetta, Giuseppe Coopmans de Yoldi, and Diane F. Zervas. Orsanmichele a Firenze. Ed. Diane F. Zervas. Vol. 1-2. Italy: Franco Cosimo Panini, 1996.
- King, Sarah. "Orsanmichele's St. Luke Tabernacle," 2009.
- Pope-Hennessy, John Wyndham, Sir. Introduction to Italian Sculpture. Vol. 1. New York: Phaidon, 1955.
- Staley, Edgcumb. The Guilds of Florence. London: Methuem & Co., 1906.
