= Orsanmichele =

Church and museum in Florence

Coordinates: 43°46′14.73″N 11°15′18.61″E

External videos
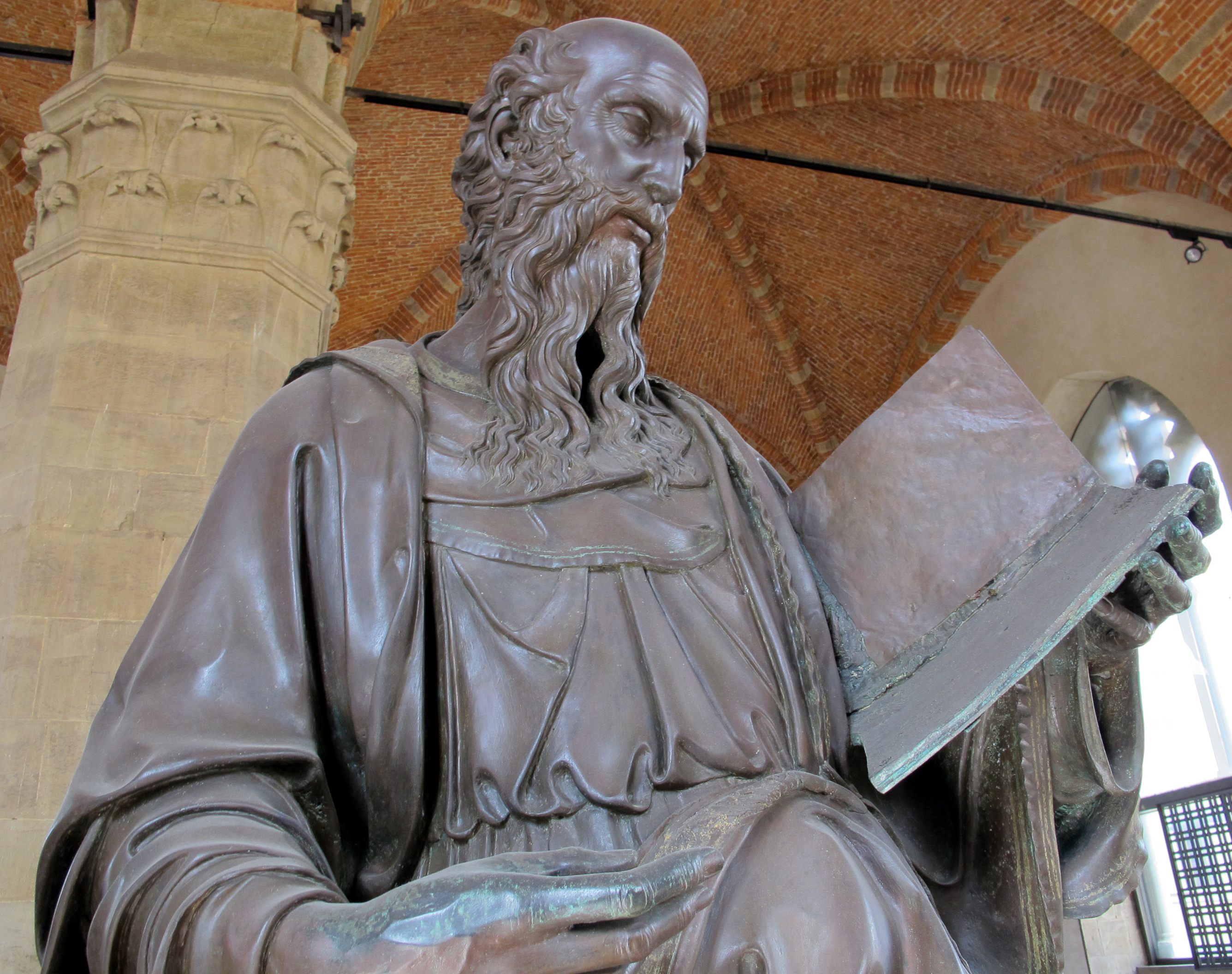
- "Orsanmichele". Smarthistory. Khan Academy.

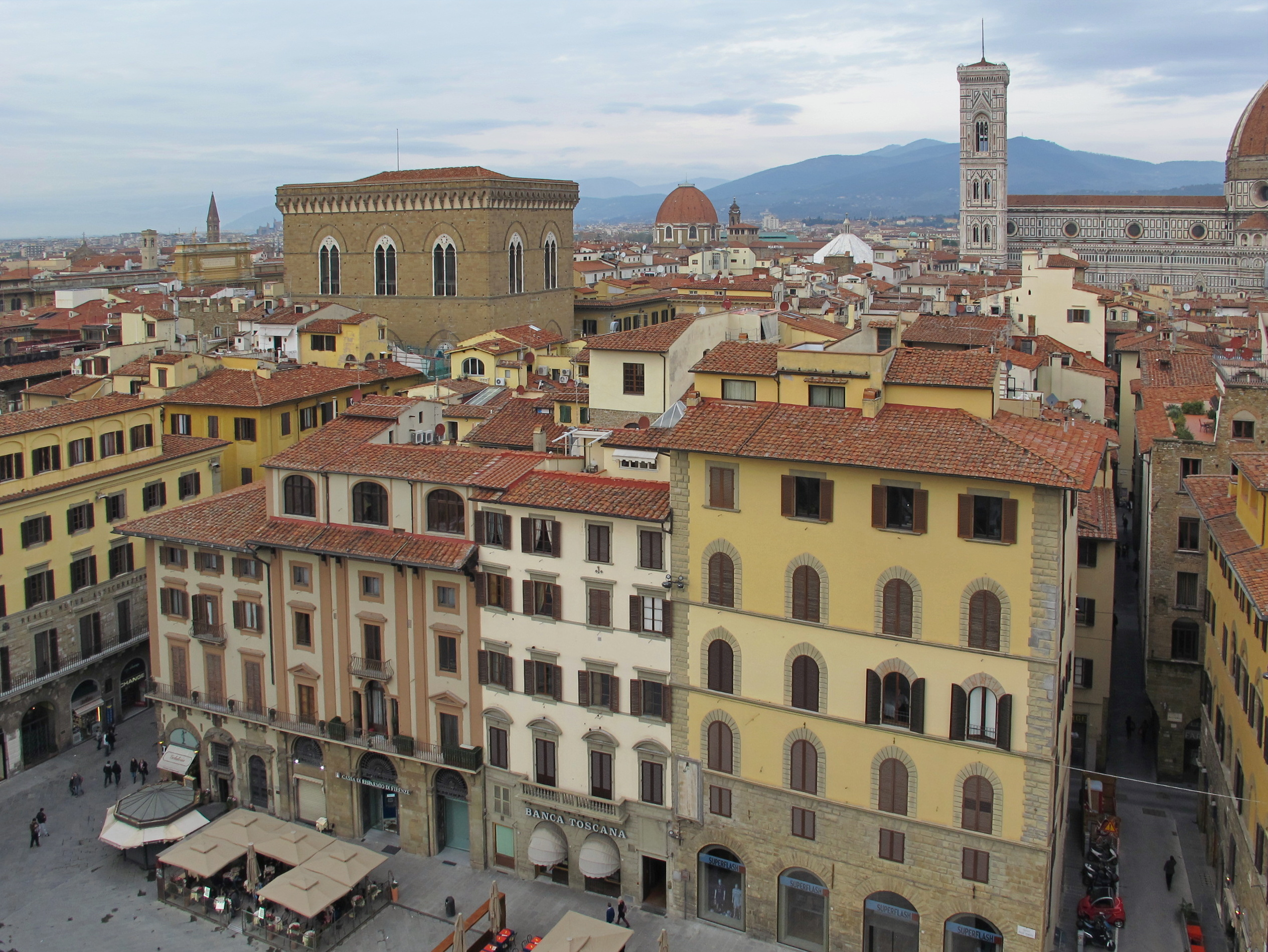
Orsanmichele, seen from the tower of Palazzo Vecchio

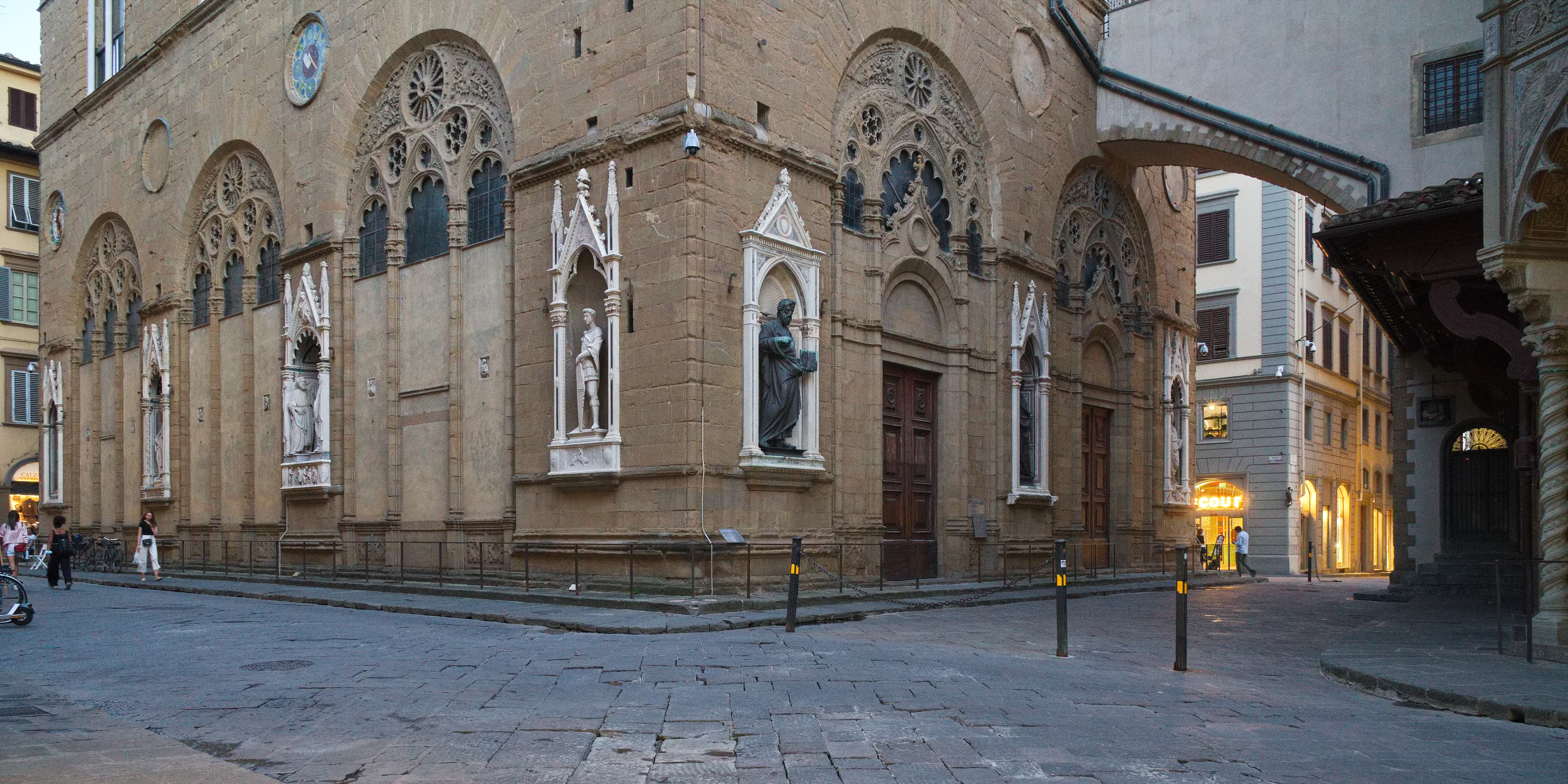
Orsanmichele, with a replica of Donatello's Saint George left of the corner

Orsanmichele, Or San Michele or Orsammichele (pronounced [orsammiˈkɛːle]; from the Tuscan contraction of Orto di San Michele, "orchard" or "kitchen garden of Saint Michael") is a communal building and church in the Italian city of Florence. Its uniqueness as an architectural construction lies not only in its multifunctionality as grain market, granary and oratory. The tabernacle by Orcagna, called the high point of Italian Gothic sculpture, and the sculptural program running around all four façades, depicting the patron saints of the major Florentine guilds, are extraordinary. It encompasses several firsts in marble and bronze, and lasting masterpieces of the Early Renaissance by Lorenzo Ghiberti, Donatello and Nanni di Banco.

== Historical background ==
From the mid-13th century, Florence experienced a period of prosperity and relative peace. The late 12th and 13th centuries witnessed the rise of guilds, particularly the arti maggiori among wealthier residents and arti minori among residents of middling wealth. From the early 13th century, leading segments of society also formed two opposing political factions: the Guelphs, who had won power in the struggle against the ruling feudal aristocracy, were loyal to the papacy, while the Ghibellines were allegiant to the Holy Roman emperor.

During the twelfth century, noble and elite families formed a consular government, leading to an essentially self-governing city, known as a commune. By 1250, resistance to noble rule led to the first "popular" government, known as the Primo Popolo. During the 1250s, the Primo Popolo worked to break up the long-held political and physical rule of leading nobles and aristocrats, entailing in part the destruction of their fortified towers. The city meanwhile experienced economic prosperity through the growth of guilds and through commerce and finance on a local, regional, and international basis. By 1282, representatives of the most wealthy and powerful guilds ruled the city. These included bankers, judges and notaries, leaders of cloth manufacturing, and elite merchants. After 1293 and 1295, with the Ordinances of Justice, certain nobles and others who were deemed "magnates" were excluded from government participation.

From the mid-13th century, Florence also experienced a building boom with the construction of private, public and ecclesiastical buildings, as well as new infrastructure: the new Cathedral (1296), the Dominican church of Santa Maria Novella (1294) and the Franciscan Santa Croce (1295), the Palazzo dei Priori (1298), the rebuilding of the Badia from 1284, and the third expansion of the city walls (1284), subsequently comprising Santissima Annunziata and Ognissanti. From about the mid-13th century until the later fourteenth century, Florence established its central grain market at Orsanmichele, while other foods were sold at the Mercato Vecchio and markets around the city. Orsanmichele's grain market was accompanied by the Confraternity of Orsanmichele from 1291, which emerged as a leading and notably lay confraternity.

From the 13th century and into the 14th, Florence experienced recurring political feuds and battles, the flood of 1333 which destroyed the city's four bridges and damaged many structures, the crash in 1346 of the two major banking companies (those formed by the Bardi and the Peruzzi families), and the bad harvests of the two following years. The most severe crisis by far was the Black Death. Its first appearance in 1340 and the pan-European outbreak of 1348 took the lives of about half of the 100,000 inhabitants of Florence.

== History ==
Located on the Via Calzaiuoli, a main road in the historic centre of Florence, between Palazzo della Signoria and the Cathedral, the city's civic and religious centres, respectively, the structure was built on a piazza. The location originally contained an oratory and then a small church dedicated Saint Michael with a kitchen garden (orto), which was said to date from Lombard times. In the 12th and 13th centuries, the church was used for ecclesiastical and communal gatherings, until it was attacked during factional fighting in 1239 and then designated for replacement by a grain loggia in 1284. The structure was completed in 1290 as an open loggia for the grain market Its construction was probably directed by Arnolfo di Cambio, who was not only master of the Opera del Duomo (cathedral works) but also "capomaestro of our commune", as a contemporary source calls him. A fresco of the Madonna, painted on one of the pillars, and then painted on a panel set in an oratory, was venerated since 1292, when spontaneous miracles reportedly occurred. The Confraternity of Orsanmichele ("OSM"), a laudesi group which was founded in 1291, sang songs (laudes) in praise of the Virgin, in the evenings, on the Sabbath, and on holidays, after the grain market had closed.

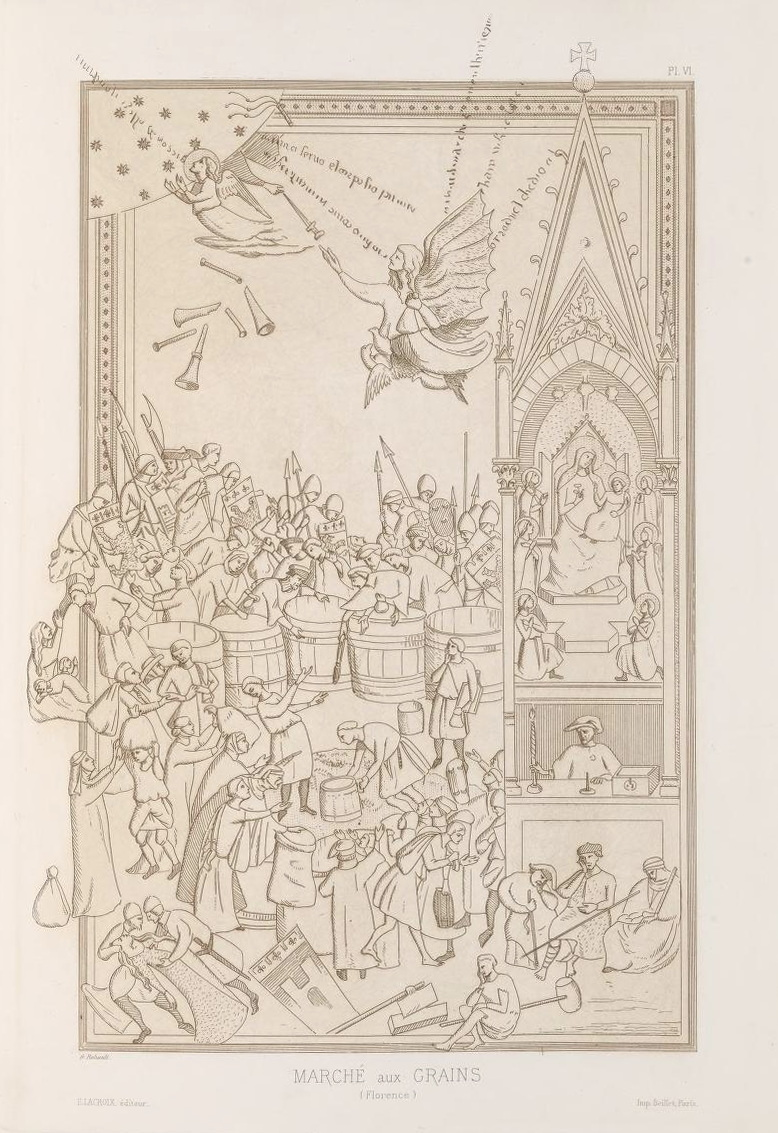
14th ct. depiction of the bustling activity of the grain market and the oratory with candles sold from inside the tabernacle

In 1304 the building was destroyed by fire, when a renegade prior, Neri Abati, was prompted by Corso Donati's Neri faction of nobles to set fire to the businesses and houses of their enemies, the Bianchi, a faction of leading merchants and members of the major commercial guilds, headed by the Cerchi family. Many people were killed, and the whole neighborhood burnt down, along with family palaces which hosted judicial proceedings and meetings of the communal government. Fires were not uncommon at the time, because of the many wooden shacks that made up much of the city's housing for a good part of its 100,000 inhabitants (1338) until around a hundred years later. According to Giovanni Villani, a chronicler of the city at the time, a fire had previously burnt 1700 buildings to the ground. The destruction was usually followed by a building boom.

On 25 September 1336 the city counsel decided to rebuild a "representative palazzo" that combined religious and communal functions and could "show the splendor of the city in its arts and artworks." Supervision of the project was delegated to the major Arte Por Santa Maria, and, according to Giorgio Vasari, Taddeo Gaddi, a pupil of Giotto († 1337), and his successor as capomaestro of the Opera del Duomo by then.

After Bernardo Daddi had painted a new Maestà (an image of the enthroned Madonna with the child Jesus) in 1347, which inherited the miraculous powers of the lost fresco, Andrea di Cione, better known as Orcagna, was commissioned to build a precious tabernacle to house the Madonna, funded by increased donations after the plagues of 1340 and 1348. While working on the extraordinary architecture (1352–1359), Orcagna became capomaestro of Orsanmichele from 1355 to 1359. Francesco Talenti, Neri di Fioravante, and Benci di Cione are also documented on the site from 1349. Neri had sponsored Orcagna in 1352 becoming a member of the Guild of "masters of stone and wood".

Between 1380 and 1404, the problem of the disharmonious coexistence of the market and the devotion of the Madonna had to be resolved and it was decided to convert the ground floor of Orsanmichele into a church for the guilds, which was dedicated to the Virgin and to her mother, Saint Anne, commemorating the expulsion of the Duke of Athens from Florence on Saint Anne's Day in 1343. The loggia was walled up in 1367 with delicate tracery in the pointed arches. The two upper floors housed the municipal granary.

As early as 1339 the main guilds had each been assigned a space between the arches to make a framed niche, with a statue of their patron saint in it. At this time, only the Arte della Lana (wool manufacturers guild) seems to have done so (this figure was later replaced by Ghiberti's bronze of St. Stephen). Towards the end of the 14th century, the guilds were again charged by the city with the same task. The majority of the statues date from 1399 to 1428, with two of the earliest from that period later replaced in the 16th century. The sculptures seen in the exterior niches today are copies, the originals having been removed to museums, mostly to the one on the upper floor of the building (see below).

Rising from a base of 32.4 × 22.1 meters to a height of 40 meters, the building has three approximately uniform floors. Over time it managed to fulfill conflicting functions. It was neither fortified with a crenellated parapet like the Palazzo della Signoria, or provided with a family tower like private palazzi were at the time, nor flanked by a campanile like churches. Situated between the two centers of religious and secular power, the guild hall also served a symbolic function. The city's economic prosperity was ensured by civic order and religious support, and lack of food supplies caused by unforeseeable crop failures or military sieges could be absorbed by the communal granary.

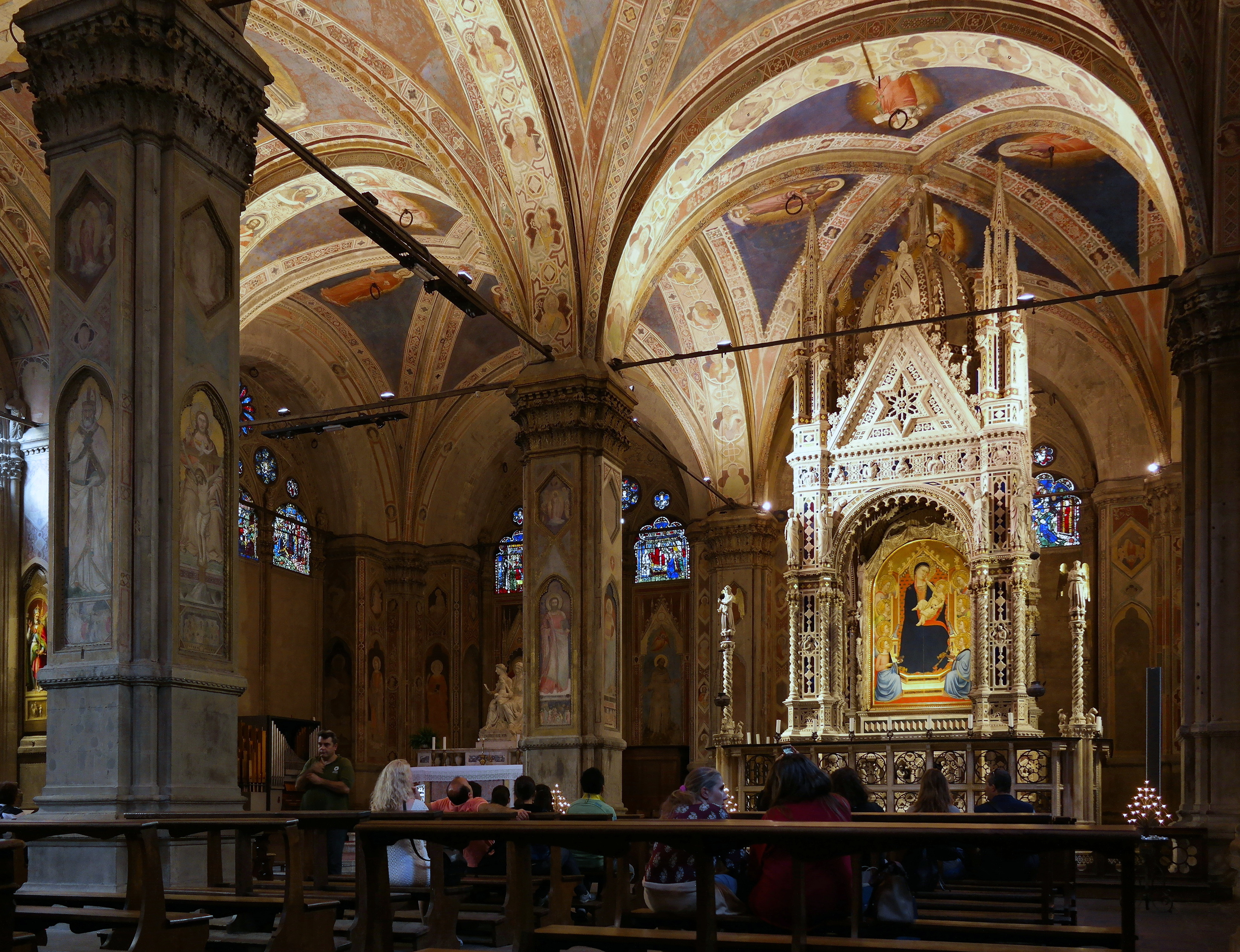
Interior of the oratory with the tabernacle by Orcagna (1352–1359)

== The oratory ==
=== The Maestà and its tabernacle by Orcagna ===
In the oratory on the ground floor of the building stands the marble tabernacle, created in 1359 to encase an image of the Madonna venerated as miracle-working. The panel painting of the enthroned Virgin Mary was executed in 1347 by the painter Bernardo Daddi. The extremely elaborate Gothic architectural work of the tabernacle was designed and executed by the Florentine artist Andrea Orcagna, who also created "the most distinguished painting of the time" (after Giotto's death), the Strozzi Altarpiece in Santa Maria Novella. The buttresses, spiral columns, pinnacles and the rich figural decoration in white marble is contrasted with inlays of blue, red, and gilded glass tesserae. The sculptural program of the tabernacle varies and renders the theme of the Madonna it encases.

A marble curtain with painted ornamentation opened by angels frame the Maestà, echoed by another behind the tracery of the frontal arch. The theatrical device, which softens the lines of the architecture, was introduced by Giotto or Andrea Pisano in some of the small reliefs on the lower part of the cathedral's campanile. It recurrs, either as curtain or tent, in the octagonal reliefs that run around the base of the tabernacle (two on each side), revealing Scenes of the Life of the Virgin. The cycle begins on the tabernacle's east side with the Annunciation to Anne, the Birth of Mary, Mary at the Temple, Mary's Engagement, the Annunciation, the Nativity, the Adoration of the Magi, the Presentation at the Temple, and the Annunciation of Mary's Death. The cycle culminates in her Burial and Assumption, two scenes above of one another, that cover the reverse of the architecture. The grief of the apostles gathered around her dead body is shown "with violent rhetoric". Jesus stands in their midst blessing her and holding his mother's soul in the shape of a swaddled baby. But, according to John Pope-Hennessy, the ascending Madonna sitting in a mandorla is the only figure with a real sense of volume and a relation to space. At the bottom of the sarcophagus Orcagna signed the work in capitals: ANDREAS CIONIS PICTOR FLORENTIN[US] ORATORII ARCHIMAGISTER EXTITIT HUI[US] MCCCLIX ("Andrea [di] Cione, Florentine painter, master of the oratory, did this in 1359").

In his Commentari Lorenzo Ghiberti noted that Orcagna allegedly was paid an immense sum of 86,000 florins for the tabernacle. Mainly due to the plague of 1348, the confraternity of Orsanmichele was most "showered with bequests" – according to Villani, it had accumulated donations of the unprecedented sum of 350,000 florins. At its inauguration in 1359 the tabernacle was praised and called one of the wonders of the world. A commentator said that "it would be more beautiful and worth as much in marble as if it was built in silver," the first time since Classical antiquity that the work of a master (its subtilitas) was valued more highly than precious materials. In 1366, before it was walled in, a railing was put around the tabernacle because of the influx of large numbers of the devout. The "unorthodox" dome that crowns the tabernacle may be a prototype of the cupola of Florence Cathedral and a reminder of its importance in the public discourse, decades away from its completion, just as in Andrea di Bonaiuto's The Way of Salvation a fresco in the Spanish Chapel of Santa Maria Novella painted at about the same time (1365–1367), which depicts a completed Duomo.

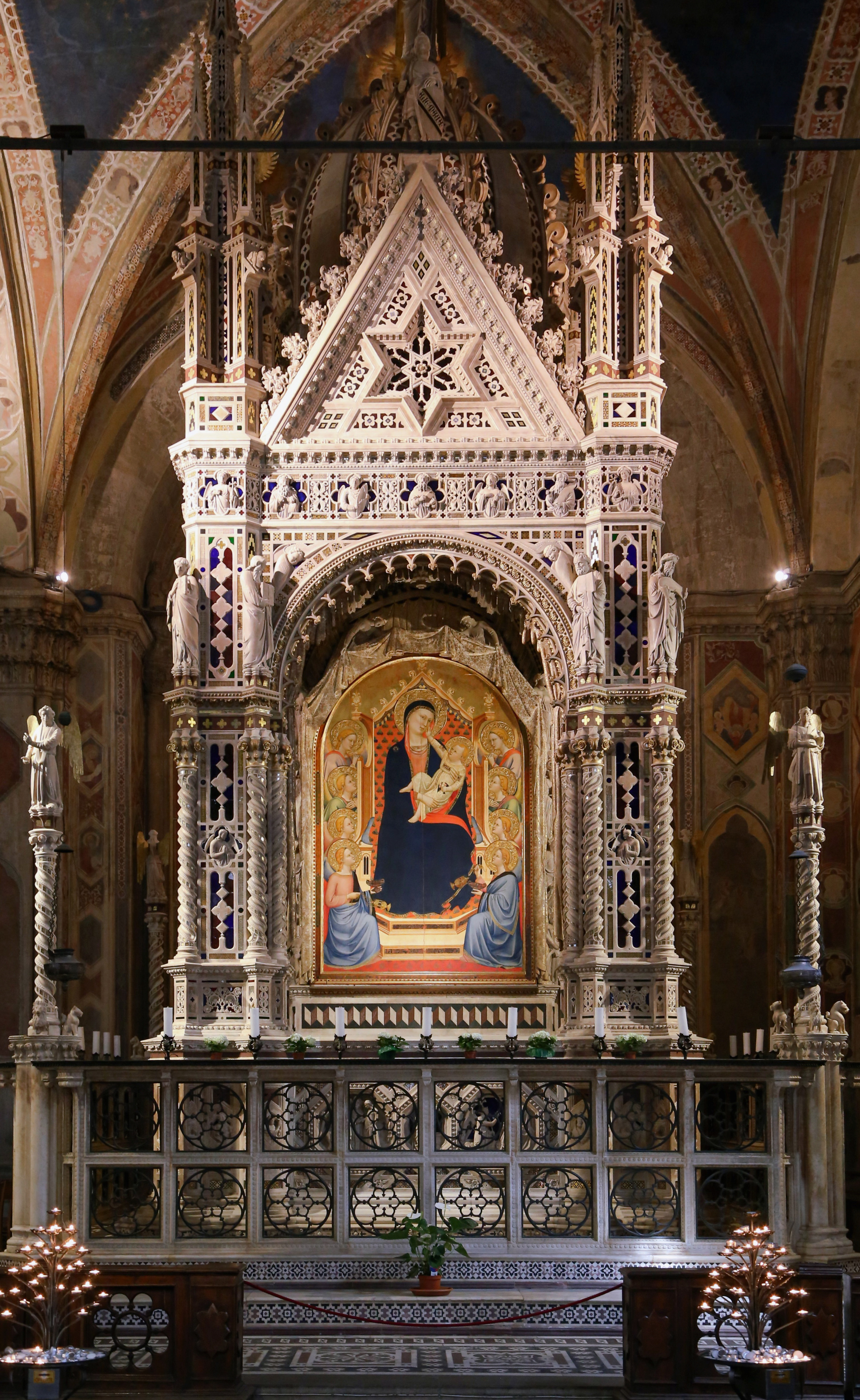
The Maestà by Bernardo Daddi (1347) housed in the tabernacle

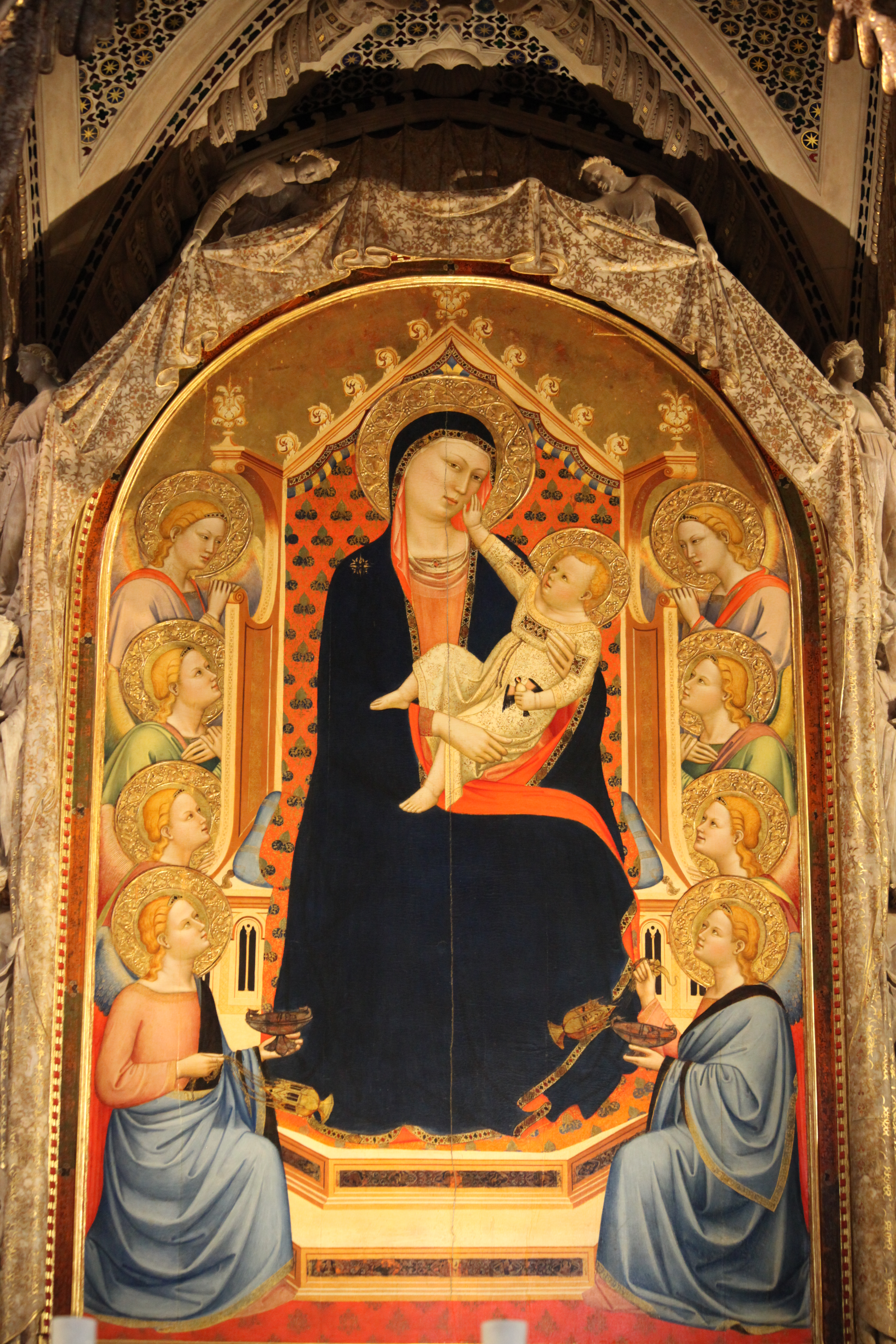
The Madonna Enthroned in detail

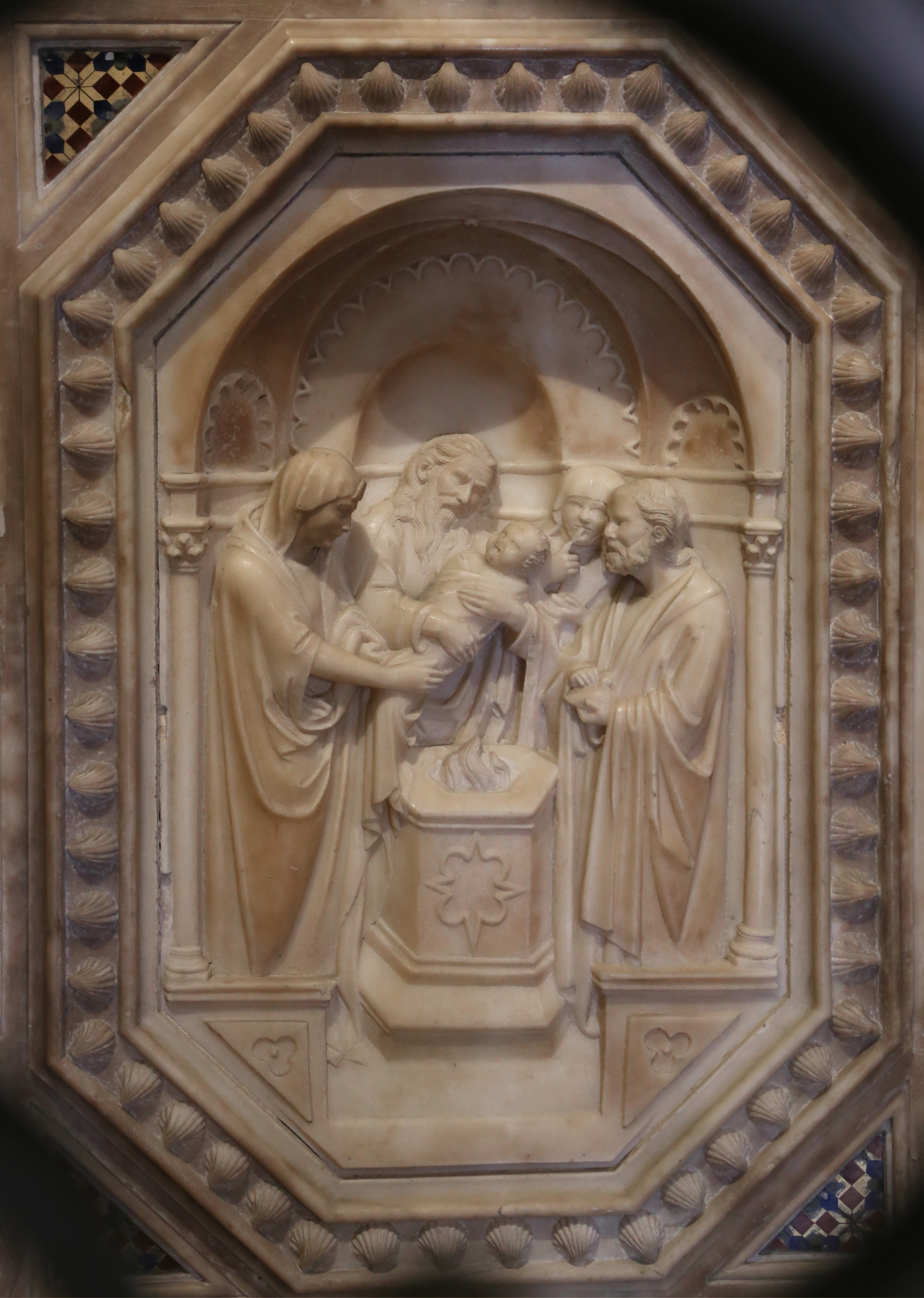
Presentation at the Temple

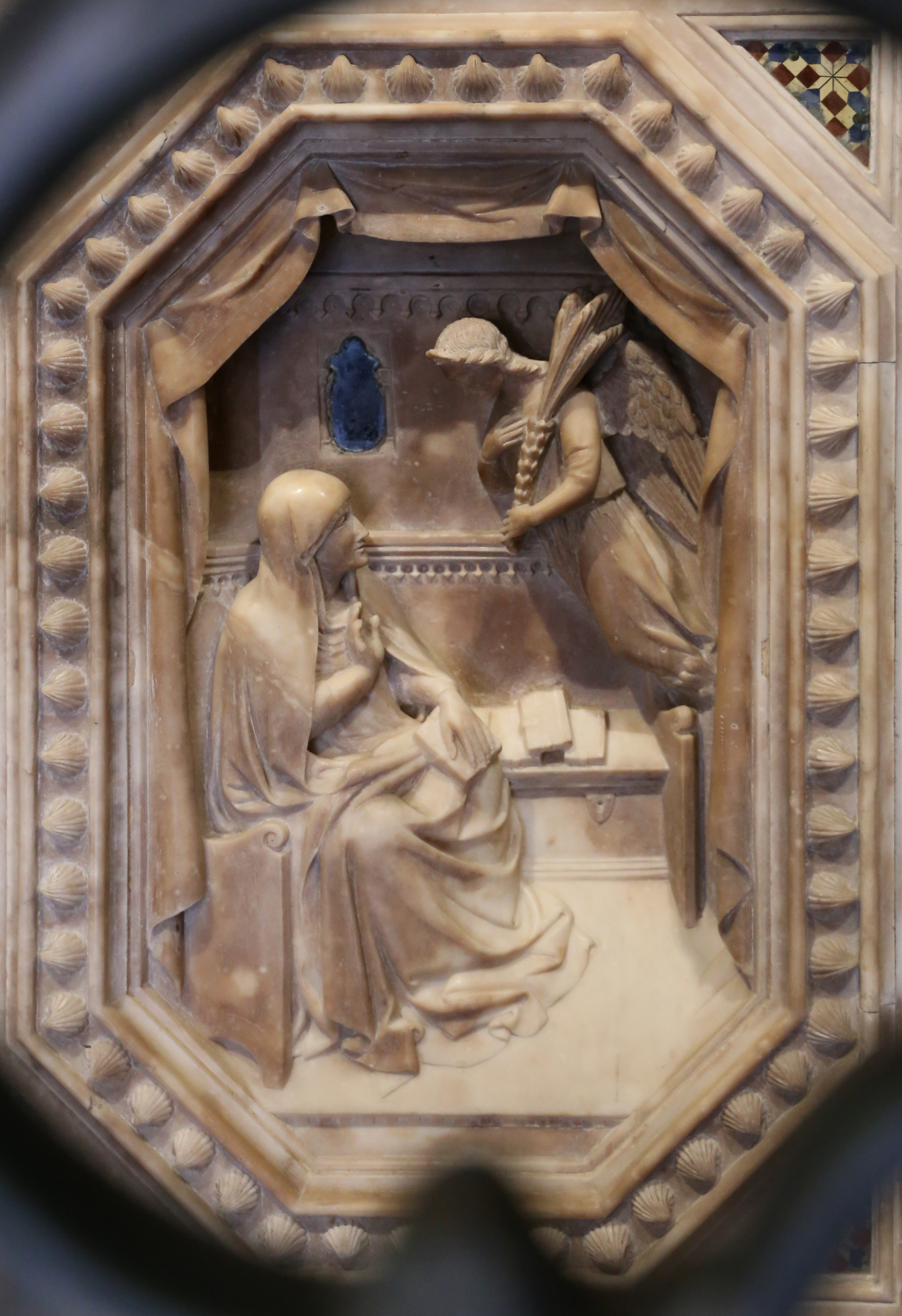
Annunciation of the Death of the Virgin

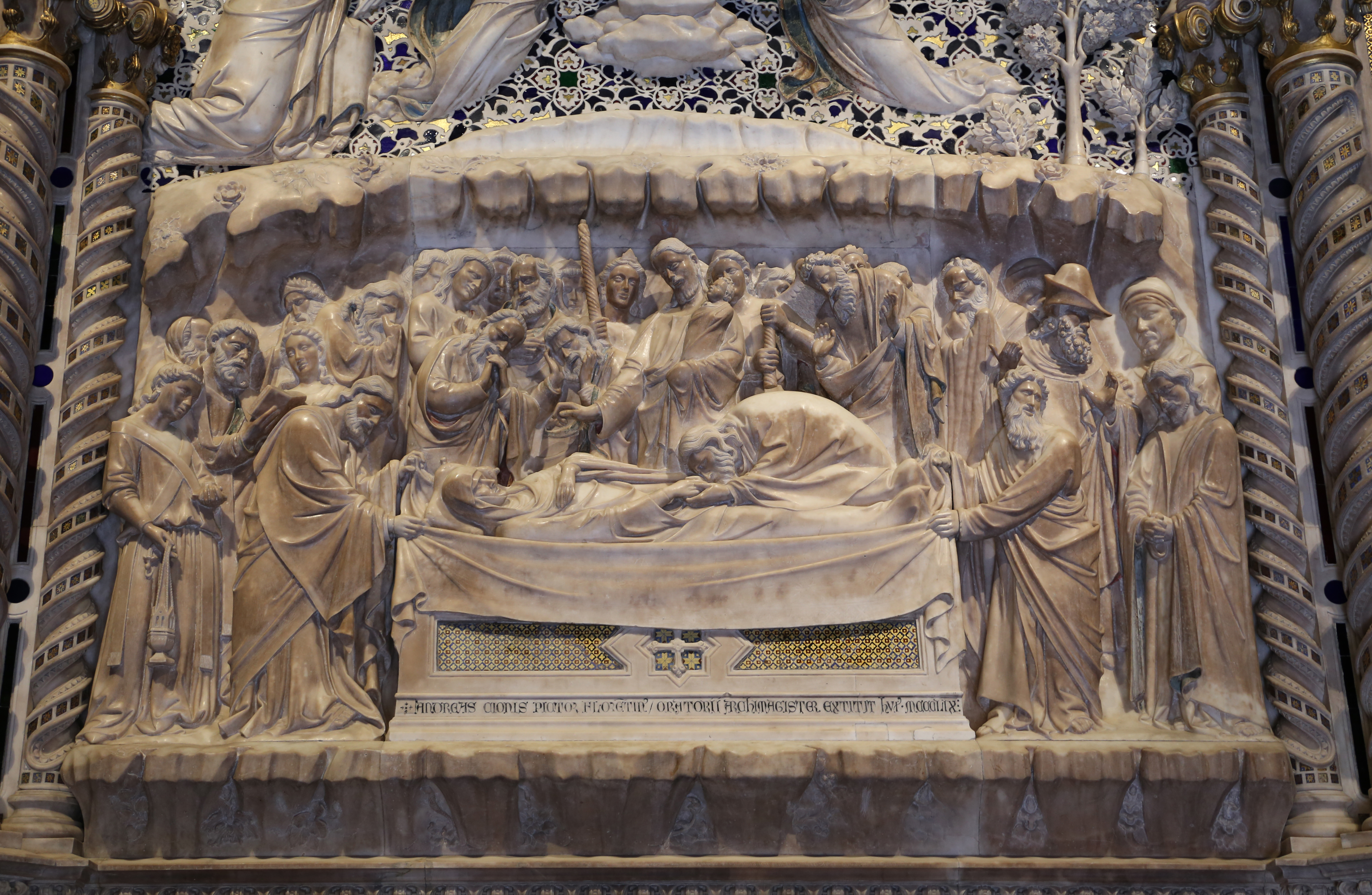
Relief of the Burial of the Virgin on the back of the tabernacle

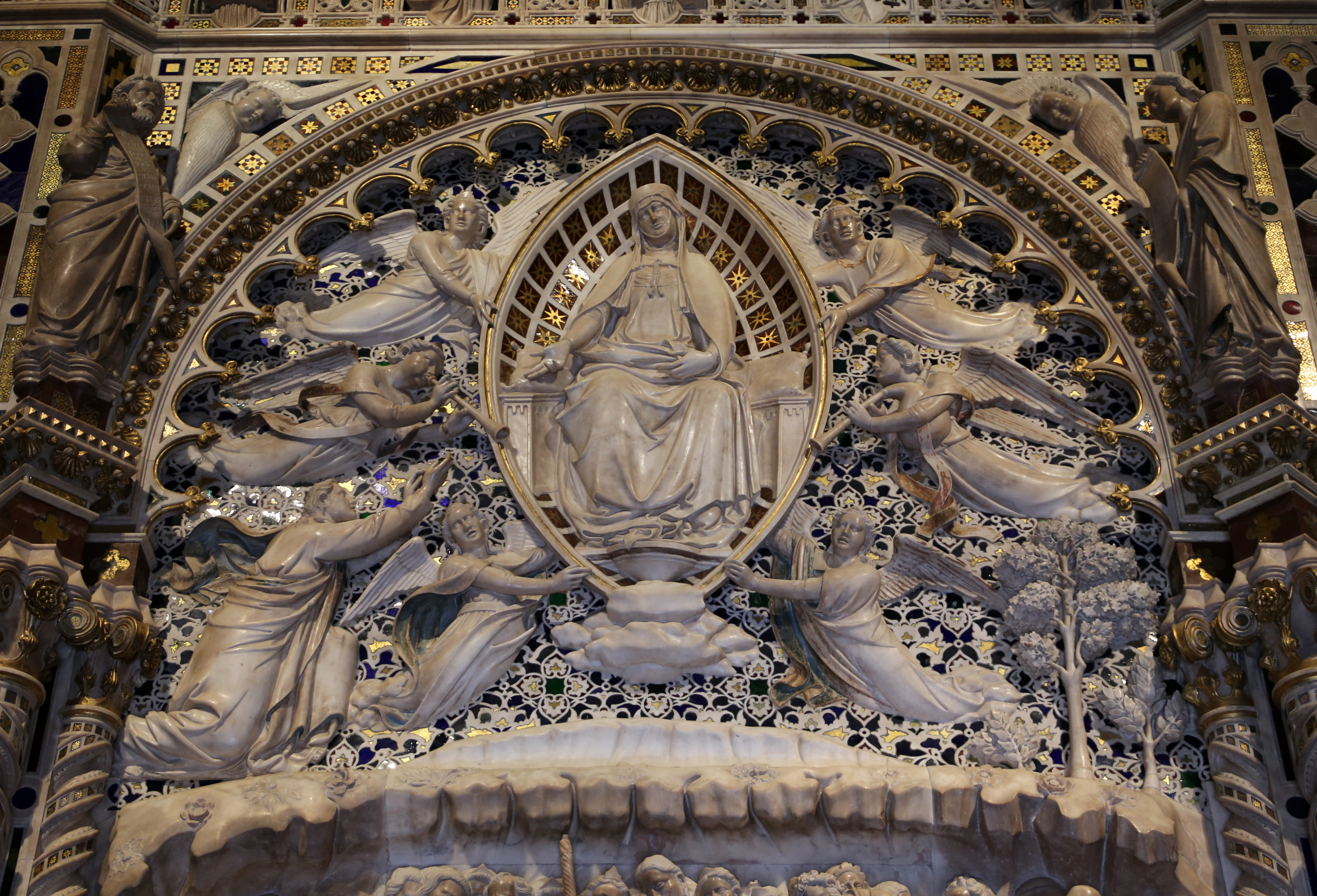
Relief of the Virgin's Ascension

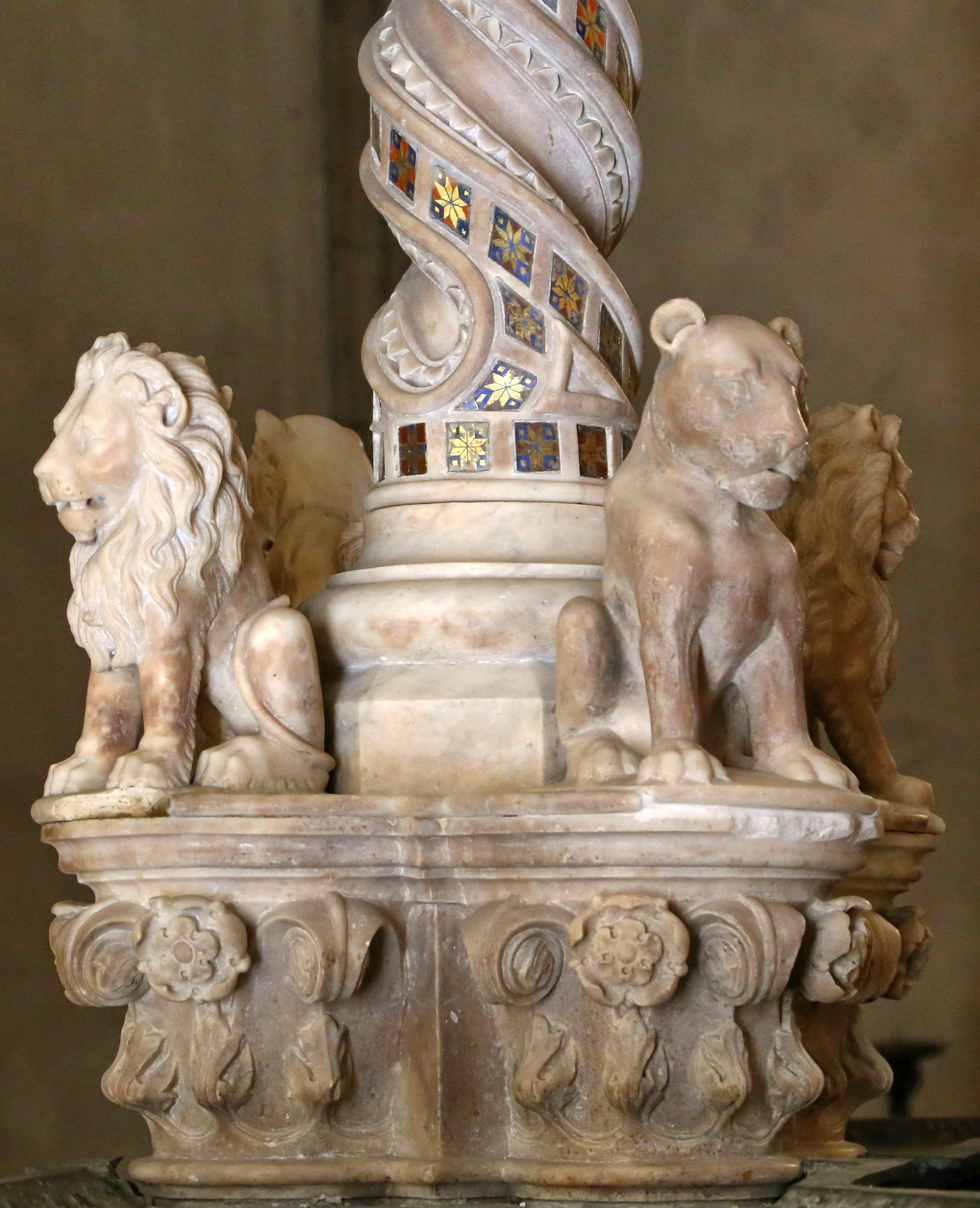
Lions and a lioness at a pinnacle of the balustrade

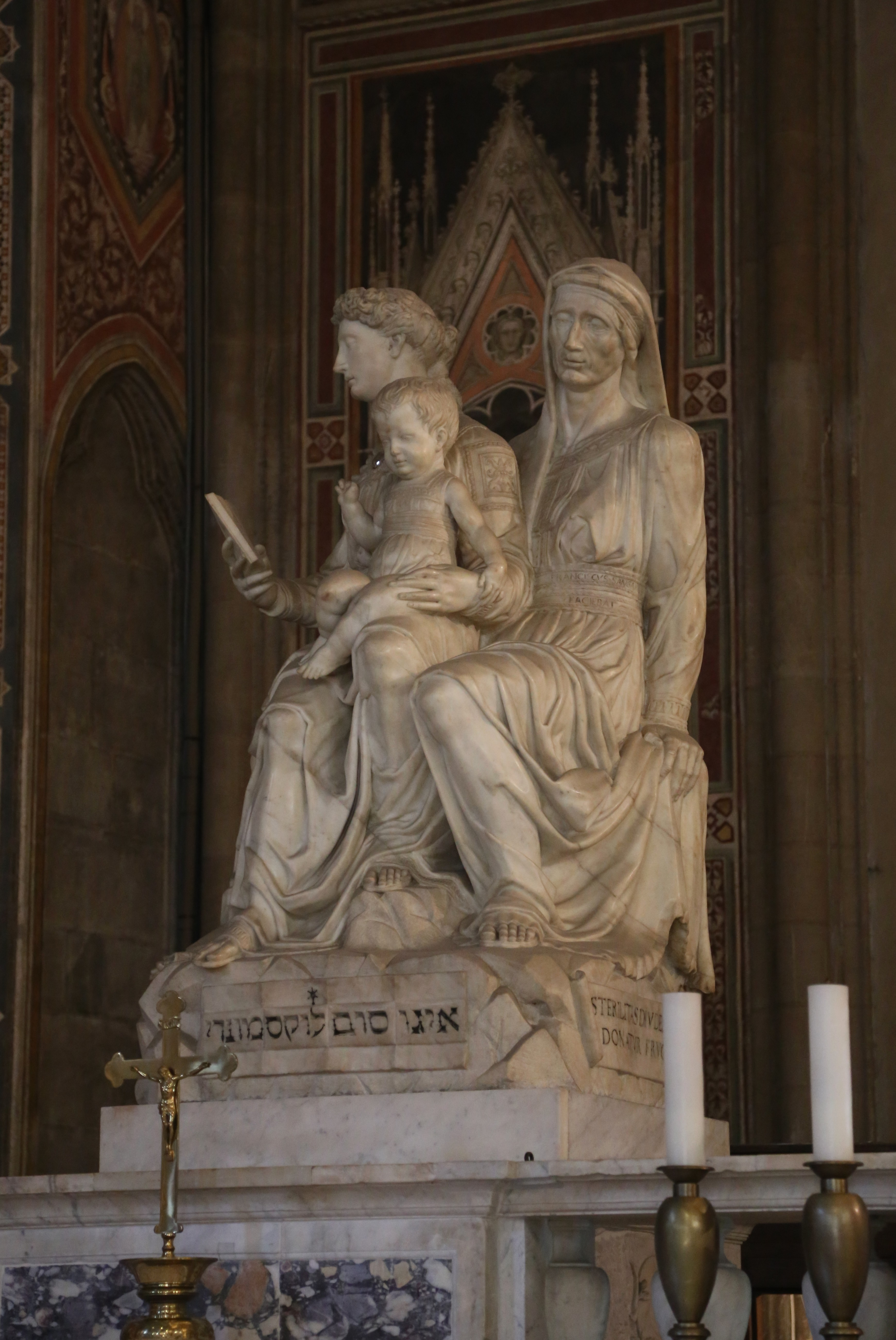
St. Anna altar with the Metterza by Francesco da Sangallo (c. 1526)

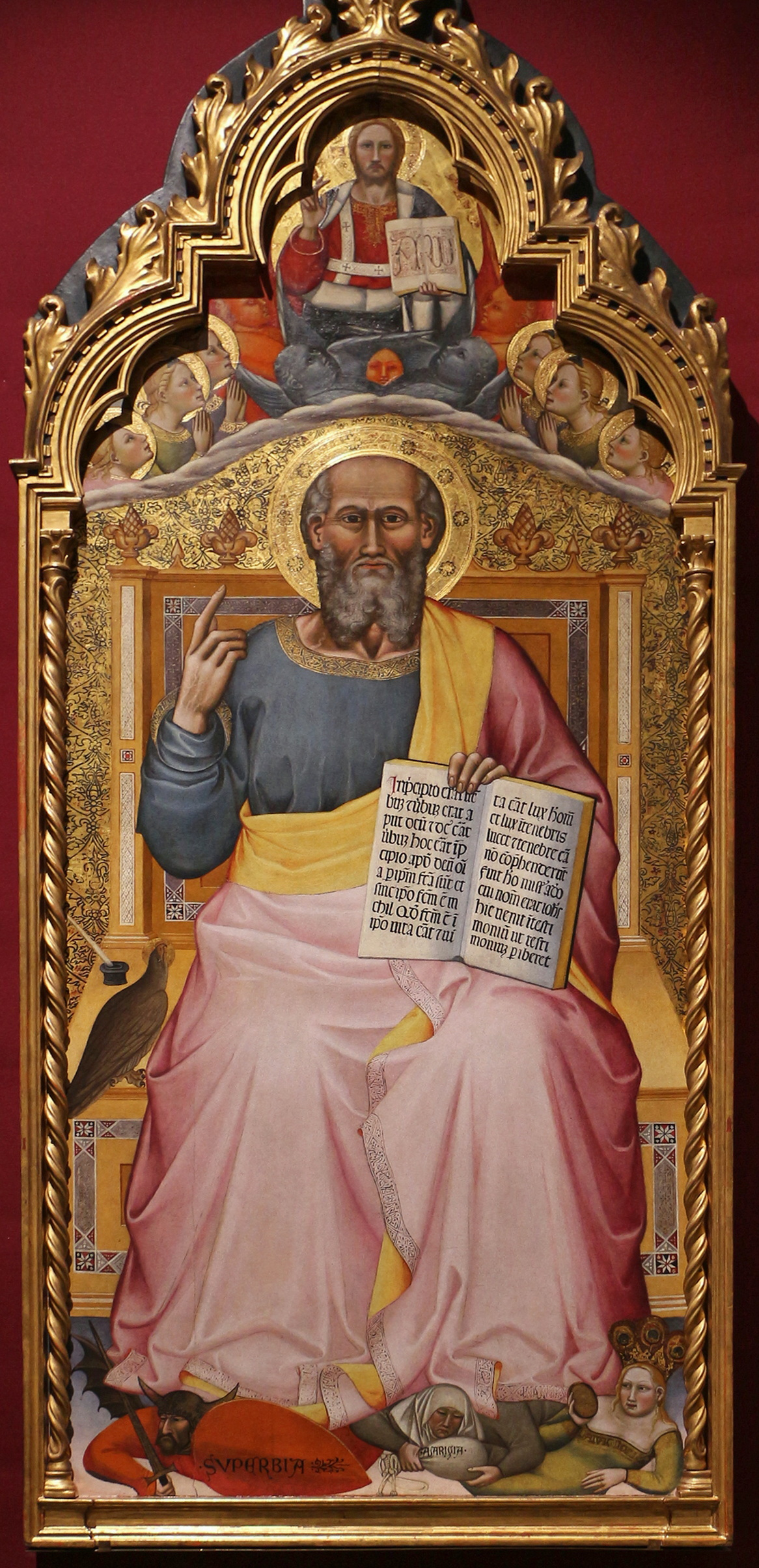
John the Evangelist Trampling on Vices (Accademia)

=== Other works ===
In the bay to the left of the tabernacle, a marble group on the altar created by Francesco da Sangallo around 1526, shows a reading Mary, the blessing Christ Child on her lap, and Saint Anne sitting next to her daughter (so-called Sant' Anna Metterza). The frescoes that "cover virtually every surface of the interior" were painted after the arcades were closed between 1389 and 1400. Stylistically they are more conservative and less naturalistic and three-dimensional than the Giotto-esque figures of the reliefs on the tabernacle. Just as on the outside walls, the patron saints of the guilds are painted on the piers inside. The St John the Evangelist for example, formerly frescoed on a pier facing the Maestà (now in the Accademia), painted by Giovanni di Biondo (a pupil of Nardo di Cione) for the Arte della Seta is powerful in a static, iconic way, though adequate for the venue. Probably painted shortly after the Ciompi Revolt around 1380, in which the labourers of the guild members stood up, too, the religious symbolism informs a political subtext of power and stability: under the saints feet allegorical figures of Pride, Avarice and Vanity appear tread down.

The window lunettes depict scenes from the life of Mary and the miraculous work of the Maestà. After extensive restoration the oratory has been open to the public again since January 2024.

== Exterior ==
The four façades hold 14 architecturally designed external niches in Gothic style on the pillars between the closed arches, except for the one made by Donatello for his St. Louis of Toulouse, which constitutes the first tabernacle designed again according to the principles of the Classical order, with an architrave on fluted pilasters flanking a conch instead of a ripped vault. As each niche was built for its respective statue, some show at their base an illustrative relief of the guild members' professions and their coat of arms. The three richest guilds opted to make their figures in the far more expensive bronze, which could amount to ten times the cost of a marble statue. The city counsel had already decided on the decoration of the building's facade in 1339, but it needed to enact another decree in 1406 to finally get the guilds to commission their patron figures in the course of about the following 25 years.

=== Modern assessment ===
Orsanmichele's statuary is a relic of the fierce devotion and pride of Florentine trades, and a reminder that great art often arises out of a competitive climate. Each trade hoped to outdo the other in commissioning original, groundbreaking sculptures for public display on Florence's most important street, and the artists hired and materials used (especially bronze) indicate the importance that was placed on this site.

=== Restoration of the statuary ===
All of the statues suffered considerably in the 20th century through air pollution and acid rain. The comparison of photographs of a marble figure from the 1920s, where it was "still nearly intact", with pictures taken in the 1970s showed the scale of the damage. Following the nomination of Florence's historic centre as a World Heritage Site in 1982, the Opificio delle pietre dure responsible for the cultural heritage of Florence begun in 1984 to examine and restore all marble and bronze figures. Under the deposits on the marble they found "artificial patinating treatment of linseed oil pigmented with mineral soils, applied sometime around the late eighteenth or early nineteenth centuries." A laser technique was used to clean them by removing the patina and grime, a process which revealed remnants of gold leaf decoration on the hair and the borders of the vestments. The bronze statues as well showed signs of gilding. Ghiberti's St. Matthew was the last of the figures to be restored: his eyes had silver leaf inlays, which were mounted again. After over 20 years the restoration program ended with three of the statues to be shown in the National Gallery of Art in Washington before all figures were displayed again in the redesigned Museum of Orsanmichele on its first floor in 2006. Two works by Donatello are in other Florentine museums: St. George and its niche are installed in a wall of the main hall in the Bargello, and the St. Louis of Toulouse is displayed in the museum of the Basilica di Santa Croce.

== Chronological table of all 14 niches and patron saints ==
The determining factor for the primal order of the sortable table are the dates of completion and installment of each work (always regained by refreshing ["f5"] the page).

| Niche | Statue | Sculptor | Guild | Year | Notes |
|---|---|---|---|---|---|
| | Madonna of the Rose | Pietro di Giovanni Tedesco | Medici e Speziali (doctors and apothecaries) | 1399 | |
| | Four Crowned Martyrs (Quattro Santi Coronati) | Nanni di Banco | Maestri di Pietra e Legname (wood and stone workers) | 1408 | |
| | St James | Niccolò di Piero Lamberti, probably with his son Piero di Niccolò Lamberti. | Arte dei Pellicciai (furriers) | 1410 | |
| | St Mark | Donatello | Arte dei Linaiuoli e Rigattieri (linen-weavers and peddlers) | 1411–1413 | |
| | St Philip | Nanni di Banco | Arte dei Calzaiuoli (shoemakers) | 1412–1414 | |
| | St Eligius | Nanni di Banco | Arte dei Maniscalchi (farriers) | 1411–1415 | |
| | St Peter | Donatello (or Filippo Brunelleschi) | Arte dei Beccai (butchers) | 1415 | |
| | St John the Baptist | Lorenzo Ghiberti | Arte di Calimala (merchants, finishers and dyers of foreign cloth) | 1414–1416 | |
| | St George | Donatello | Arte dei Corazzai (armourers) | 1415–1417 | |
| | St Matthew | Lorenzo Ghiberti | Arte del Cambio (bankers) | 1419–1420 | |
| | St Louis of Toulouse replaced by Christ and St Thomas | Donatello; Andrea del Verrocchio | Tribunale di Mercanzia (judiciary and arbitration) | 1418–1422; 1467–1483 | |
| | St Stephen (replaced a marble St Stephen) | Lorenzo Ghiberti (Andrea Pisano) | Arte della Lana (wool manufacturers) | 1428 | |
| | St John the Evangelist (replaced a marble statue) | Baccio da Montelupo (unknown) | Arte della Seta (silk merchants) | 1513–1515 | |
| | St Luke (replaced a marble St Luke) | Giambologna (Niccolò di Piero Lamberti) | Giudici e Notai (magistrates and notaries) | 1601 (c. 1404–1406) | |

== Museum and artwork from Orsanmichele ==
In 2005 Orsanmichele came under the umbrella of the association of Florentine museums, Polo museale fiorentino, and following a reform on museum autonomy in 2015 the Museo e chiesa di Orsanmichele became part of the Musei di Bargello, with the Florentine sculpture museum as head institution.

Diane Finiello Zervas, who published the most extensive monograph on Orsanmichele, including a volume of photographic documentation and a compendium of transcripts of all known source material concerning Orsanmichele and the history of the site, made a fundamental suggestion in 2012 at the symposium closing the thirty year–long conservation campaign. Zervas wrote that the museum "should expand its vision beyond the preservation of the monumental statues and boldly reach out to the Museo dell'Opera del Duomo, the Ospedale degli Innocenti, the Bargello, and the Museo dell'Opera di Santa Croce for the return, or the permanent loan" (or at least to produce copies for the museum) of all artwork known to have been once part of Orsanmichele. On the other hand, a detached fifteenth-century fresco of the martyrdom of Saint Bartholomew, unrelated to the site but on display there, "should be moved, either back to its original location in the [Covoni Chapel of] Badia Fiorentina or to the Accademia Fiorentina".

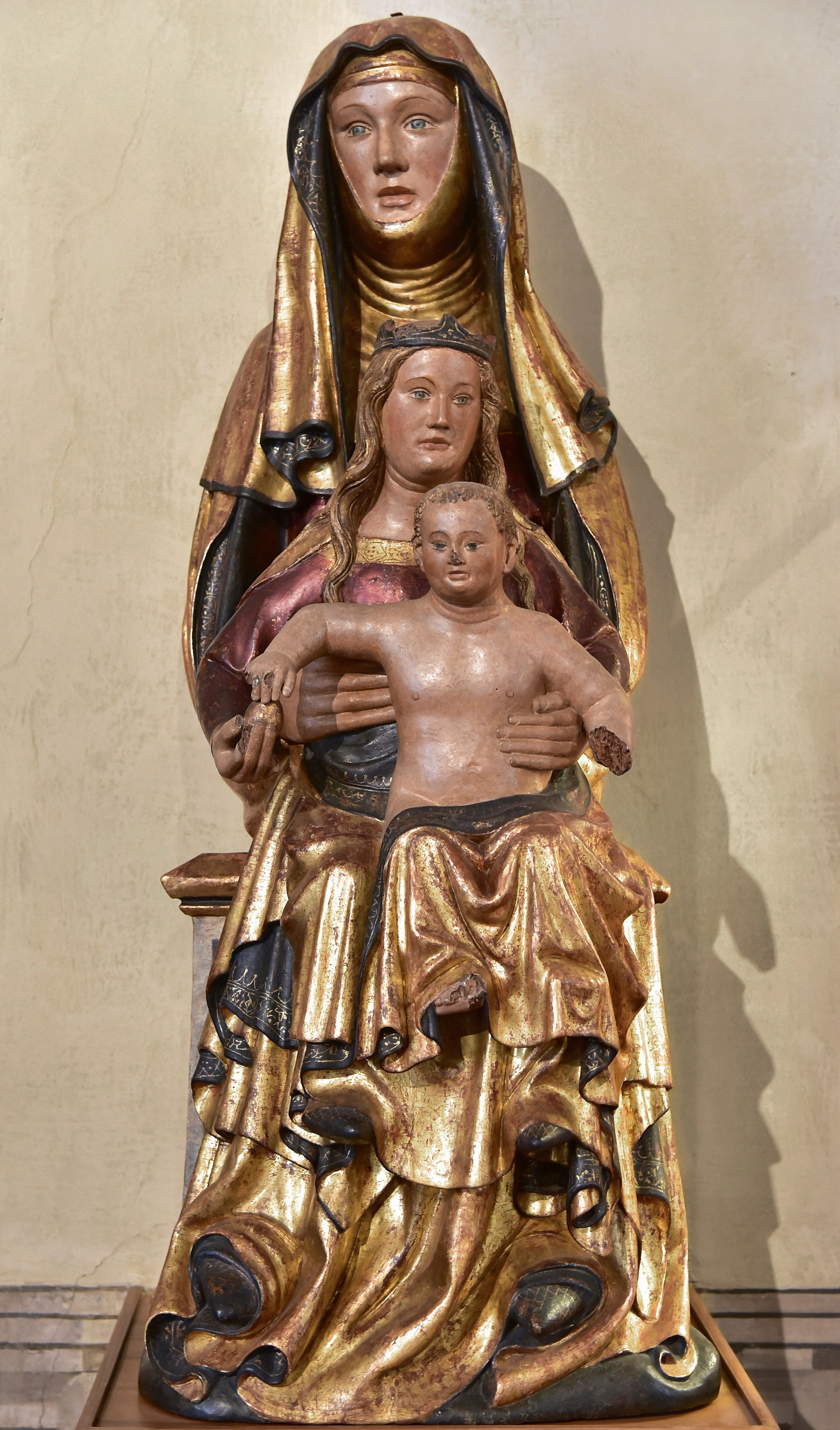
Metterza, polychromed wood, 14th century, Bargello

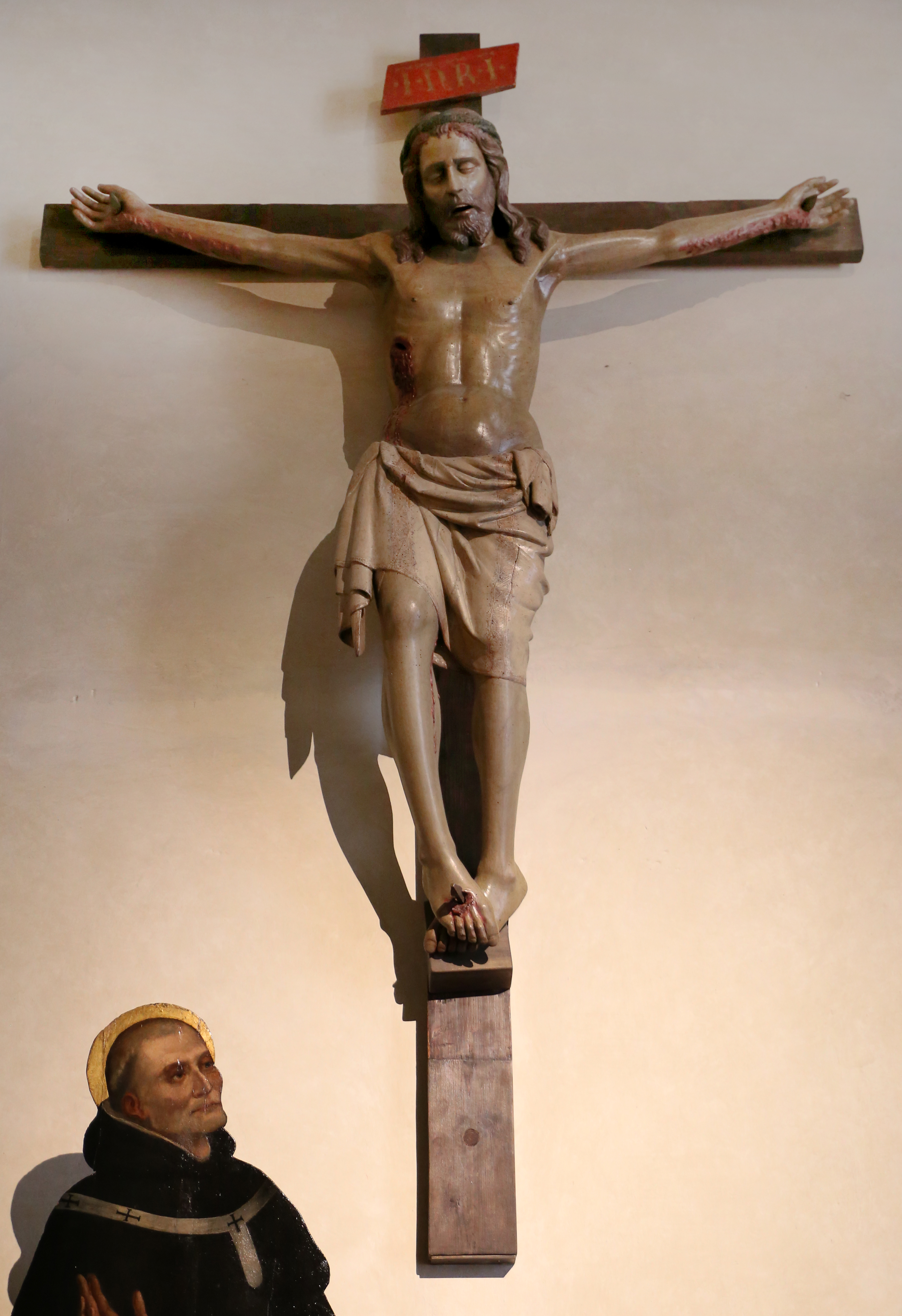
Crucifix by Orcagna, polychromed wood, c. 1360, San Carlo dei Lombardi

=== Outer façade ===
- Andrea Pisano, Saint Stephen, marble
- The "Orcagnesque" Saint John the Evangelist, marble, restored in the 2000s
- Niccolò di Piero Lamberti, Saint Luke, marble, c. 1404–1406, Bargello
- Michelozzo, Sibyls from the cusps of Lorenzo Ghiberti's tabernacle of Saint Matthew
- Donatello's Saint George, marble, c. 1415, Bargello (a plaster cast is installed in the original niche)
- Donatello, Saint Louis of Toulouse, gilded bronze, Museo dell'Opera di Santa Croce (a plaster cast is installed in the original niche)
- Three statuettes from the tabernacle of the Madonna della Rosa, marble, divided between the upper floor of Orsanmichele, the Bargello, the Lapidary Museum, Avignon, the Museo Bardini in San Marco

=== Sculptures from the oratory ===
- Virgin and Child with Saint Anne, polychomed wood, probably once on the later fourteenth-century altar of Saint Anne, now in the Bargello
- Orcagna, Crucifix, polychromed wood, c. 1360, now in San Carlo dei Lombardi (opposite the oratory)
- Several small marble lions from the corner colonnettes of Orcagna's Tabernacle of the Virgin, now at the Opificio delle Pietre Dure

=== Paintings from the oratory ===
- Bernardo Daddi's Saint John the Baptist, 1346, now in San Martino a Gangalandi
- Jacopo del Casentino, Saint Bartholomew Enthroned, c. 1330–1350, now in the Galleria dell'Accademia
- The Annunciation, c. 1350–1400, now in the Galleria dell'Accademia
- Orcagna and Jacopo di Cione, Saint Matthew Triptych, c. 1367–1368, now in the Galleria degli Uffizi
- Giovanni del Biondo, Saint John the Evangelist Enthroned, c. 1379, now in the Galleria dell'Accademia
- Lorenzo di Bicci, Saint Martin Enthroned, c. 1381–1385, now in the Galleria dell'Accademia
- Niccolò di Pietro Gerini, lateral sections from the altarpiece of the Four Crowned Martyr Saints, c. 1380–1385, now scattered among the Musée du Petit Palais, Avignon, the Denver Art Museum, a private collection in Florence, the John G. Johnson Collection of the Philadelphia Museum of Art, and the Birmingham Museum and Art Gallery
- The Miracles of Saint Nicholas of Bari, detached fresco fragments, in the Villa Corsini, Florence
- Francesco di Antonio del Chierico, three extant organ shutters, c. 1429, now in the Galleria dell'Accademia
- Piero del Pollaiuolo, Tobias and the Angel, c. 1469, now in the Galleria Sabauda, Turin

== Sources ==
- Millard Meiss (1952) [1951]. Painting in Florence and Siena after the Black Death. The Arts, Religion, and Society in the Mid-Fourteenth Century (Pb. ed.). Princeton (NJ): Princeton University Press. ISBN 0-691-00312-2.
- Walter Paatz; Elisabeth Paatz (1952). "Or San Michele". Die Kirchen von Florenz: Ein kunstgeschichtliches Handbuch. Vol. IV: M–P. Translated by Katherine Dau. Frankfurt am Main: Vittorio Klostermann. pp. 480–558 – via Florence as It Was, website of an architectural project at Washington and Lee University (WLU), Lexington.
- Marie D'Aguanno Ito, Orsanmichele: A Medieval Grain Market and Confraternity (Leiden: Brill, 2023)
- Wolfgang Braunfels (1966) [1953]. Mittelalterliche Stadtbaukunst in der Toskana (in German) (3 ed.). Berlin: Gebrüder Mann.
- Charles Seymour Jr. Sculpture in Italy, 1400–1500 (= Pelican History of Art). Penguin, London 1966.
- Gene Brucker (1969). Renaissance Florence. New Dimensions in History: Historical Cities, edited by Norman F. Cantor. New York: John Wiley & Sons. SBN 471-11370-0.
- Nancy Rash Fabbri; Nina Rutenburg (Sep 1981). "The Tabernacle of Orsanmichele in Context". The Art Bulletin. 63 (3): 385–405. JSTOR 3050142.
- Gene Brucker (1984) [1983]. Florence, the Golden Age, 1138–1737. New York: Abbeville. ISBN 0-89659-457-2.
- Gert Kreytenberg (1994). Orcagna's Tabernacle in Orsanmichele, Florence. Photographs by David Finn. New York: Harry N. Abrams. ISBN 0-8109-3675-5.
- Poeschke, Joachim (2000). Die Skulptur des Mittelalters in Italien, Vol. 2: Gotik (in German). Munich: Hirmer. ISBN 3-7774-8400-8.
- Sullivan, Mary Ann (July 10, 2005). "Orsanmichele". Digital Imaging Project: Art historical images of European and North American architecture and sculpture from classical Greek to Post-modern (1997–2018). Bluffton University.
- "Monumental Sculpture from Renaissance Florence" (Exhibition brochure). The National Gallery of Art, Washington. 2005. Archived from the original on July 13, 2006.
- John T. Paoletti; Gary M. Radke (2011) [1997]. "Or San Michele". Art in Renaissance Italy (4th rev. ed.). London: Lawrence King. pp. 166–168. ISBN 978-1-85669-797-2.
- Diane Finiello Zervas (2012). Carl Brandon Strehlke (ed.). "Degno templo e tabernacol santo": Remembering and Renewing Orsanmichele. Studies in the History of Art. Vol. 76, Symposium Papers LIII: Orsanmichele and the History and Preservation of the Civic Monument. Washington: National Gallery of Art. pp. 7–20. JSTOR 42622568.

=== Further reading ===
- Diane Finiello Zervas. The Parte Guelfa, Brunelleschi & Donatello. Villa I Tatti Series, vol. 8. Augustin, Locust Valley (NY) 1988.
- Diane Finiello Zervas (ed.). Orsanmichele a Firenze/Orsanmichele Florence, 2 vols. Mirabilia Italiae, vol. 5, Modena, 1996 (Italian/English).
- Diane Finiello Zervas (ed.). Orsanmichele: Documents 1336–1452/Documenti 1336–1452. Istituto di Studi Rinascimentali, Ferrara 1996 (Italian/English).
- Carl Brandon Strehlke (ed.). Orsanmichele and the History and Preservation of the Civic Monument (Symposium Papers LIII). Studies in the History of Art, vol. 76. National Gallery of Art, Washington 2012, ISBN 978-0-30013589-3.
