= Petris (disambiguation) =

Petris may refer to:

== Places ==
- Petriș, a commune in Arad County, Romania
- Petriș, a village in Cetate commune, Bistrița-Năsăud County, Romania
- Petriș, a village in Livezile commune, Mehedinți County, Romania
- Petriș, the Romanian name of the village of Pyiterfolvo in Ukraine
- Petriș (river), right tributary of the river Mureș in Romania

== People ==
- Gianfranco Petris (1936–2018), Italian football player
- Leandro De Petris (born 1988), Argentine professional footballer
- Loredana De Petris (born 1957), Italian politician and senator of Italian Left
- Nicholas C. Petris (1923–2013), American politician, California State Senator from 1966 until 1996
- Nicolas C. Petris (20th century), Californian politician and soldier of U.S. Army during World War II
- Tiberiu Petriș (born 1994), Romanian professional footballer

== See also ==
- Petri
- Di Pietro
