= Saint Peter (Brunelleschi) =

1412 c. marble statue by Filippo Brunelleschi

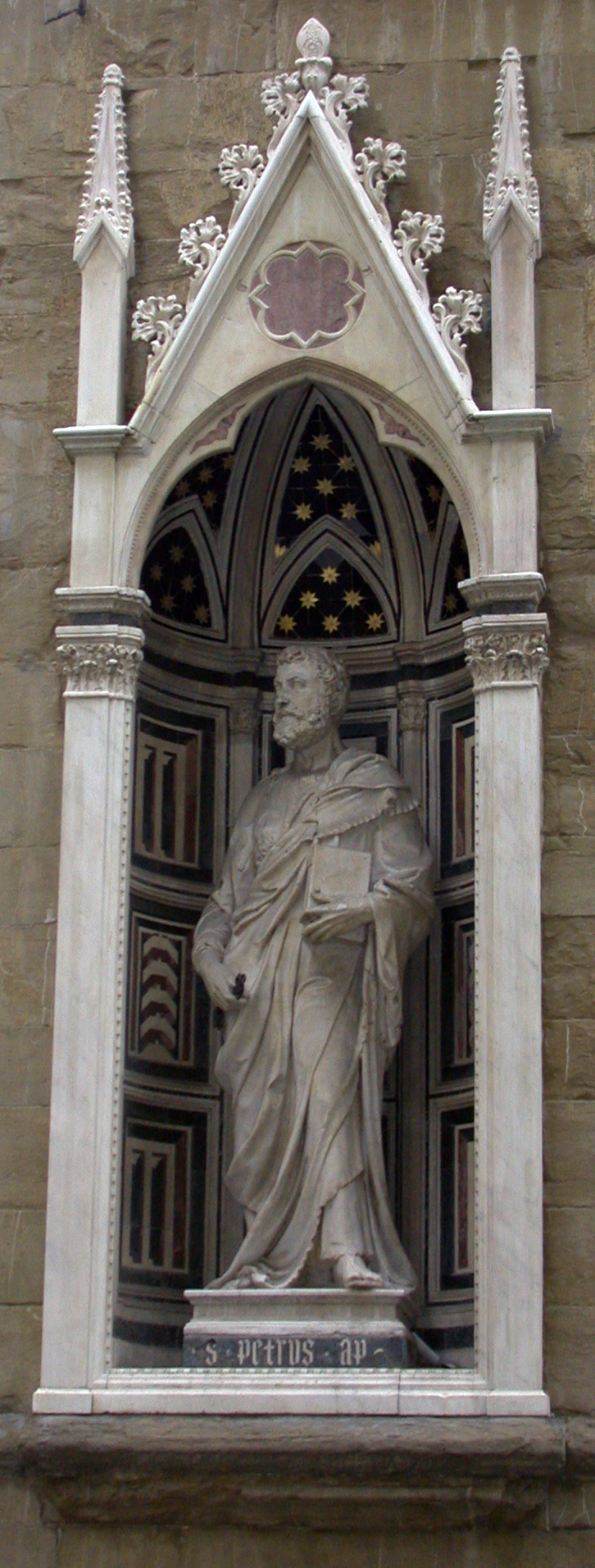
- Replica of statue outside of Orsanmichele
- Artist: Filippo Brunelleschi (attributed)
- Year: c. 1412
- Medium: Carrara marble
- Dimensions: 243 cm (96 in)
- Location: Museum of Orsanmichele, Florence

Saint Peter is a Apuan marble sculpture of Saint Peter of 2.43 m high. It is attributed to Filippo Brunelleschi and his style is influenced by Donatello. It forms part of a cycle of fourteen statues of the patron saints of the guilds of Florence for the external niches of Orsanmichele. The sculpture of St Peter was completed for the Arte dei Beccai (butchers) guild around 1412 and is now in the Museo di Orsanmichele, although a replica fills its original niche.

== History and attribution ==
Saint Peter of Orsanmichele is one of the more-discussed statues of the complex, although the documentation for its provenance and dating are lost. The traditional attribution was to Donatello, as reported by Giorgio Vasari in his Le Vite, where he wrote that the work as commissioned from Brunelleschi and Donatello but that only the second performed the work and brought it "to perfection." This attribution was placed in doubt by comparisons to the statues of Nanni di Banco, Michelozzo, and Bernardo Ciuffagni, which suggest a dating to the third decade of the 1400s. Contemporary critics are convinced by a Brunelleschi attribution for Saint Peter for the high quality of the work.

Brunelleschi, after his defeat in the competition for the second door of the Florence Baptistery in 1401, went to Rome to study classical statuary. One indication that the perspective inlays were by Brunelleschi is that they are found in the tabernacle, which is not late Gothic but modeled after tabernacles of the mid-1400s. The inlays suggest an early phase of Brunelleschi's, leading up to the Renaissance.

Saint Peter is dressed classically, like an ancient Roman statue, easily visible in Rome. His lean and tendinous wrists suggest the panel of the Sacrifice of Isaac, which is a Gothic relief. Comparing the head of Saint Peter with the following figures of the silver altar of Saint Jacob at Pistoia, an affinity in the prominence of his eyes, in the wrinkles on his forehead, and his nose can be seen.

The statue was removed from the tabernacle in 1990 to be restored at the Opificio delle pietre dure up until 1992, with the contribution of the Accademia della fiorentina and the Associazione Macellai.

== Description ==
Saint Peter is depicted as a classical philosopher, with a beard and dressed in a toga and cloak. With his left arm, he holds a book, while in his right hand he carries his typical attribute of keys (in bronze, perhaps not original). The statue looks towards the left, toward the main street of via de' Calzaiuoli.

The statue was carved in high-quality marble, not porous, that guaranteed its better conservation, compared to the rest of the series at Orsanmichele. The marble's hardness prevented it from absorbing the oils spread on marble statues at the end of the 18th and beginning of the 19th century to make them look like bronzes. The statue is the only one in the series where no traces of gilding were found. It is thought not to have had any at its making, while it was made with some metal elements, like the studs of Saint Peter's book.
