= Saint Philip (Nanni di Banco) =

Sculpture by Nanni di Banco

Coordinates: 43°46′36″N 11°15′30″E

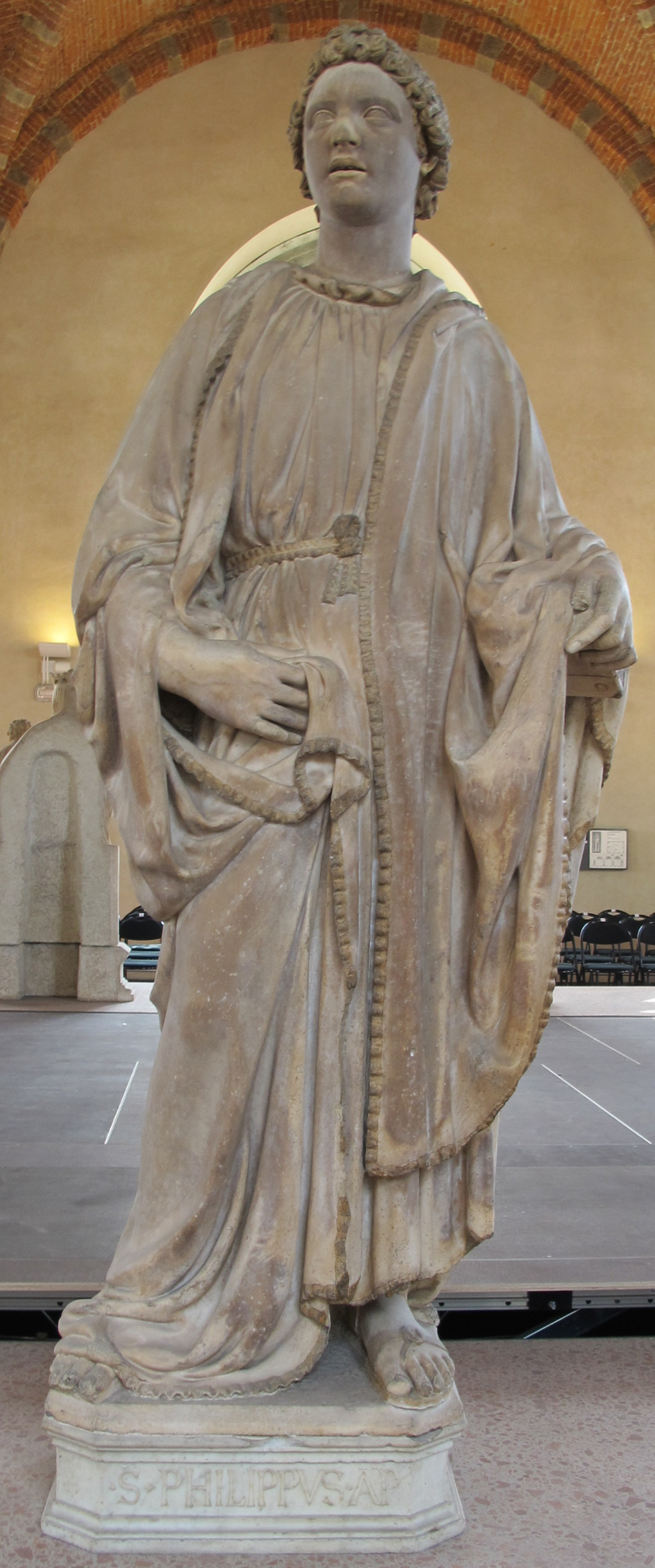

Saint Philip is an Apuan marble statue of Philip the Apostle by Nanni di Banco. It forms part of a cycle of fourteen sculptures commissioned for the external niches of Orsanmichele in Florence, each showing the patron saint of one of the city's guilds. It is 2.5 m high and was commissioned by the Arte dei Calzolai. Completed around 1410-1412, it is now in the Museo di Orsanmichele, although a replica fills its original niche.

== Bibliography ==
- Paola Grifoni, Francesca Nannelli, Le statue dei santi protettori delle arti fiorentine e il Museo di Orsanmichele, Quaderni del servizio educativo, Edizioni Polistampa, Firenze 2006.
