= Saint Eligius (Nanni di Banco) =

Sculpture by Nanni di Banco

Coordinates: 43°46′36″N 11°15′30″E

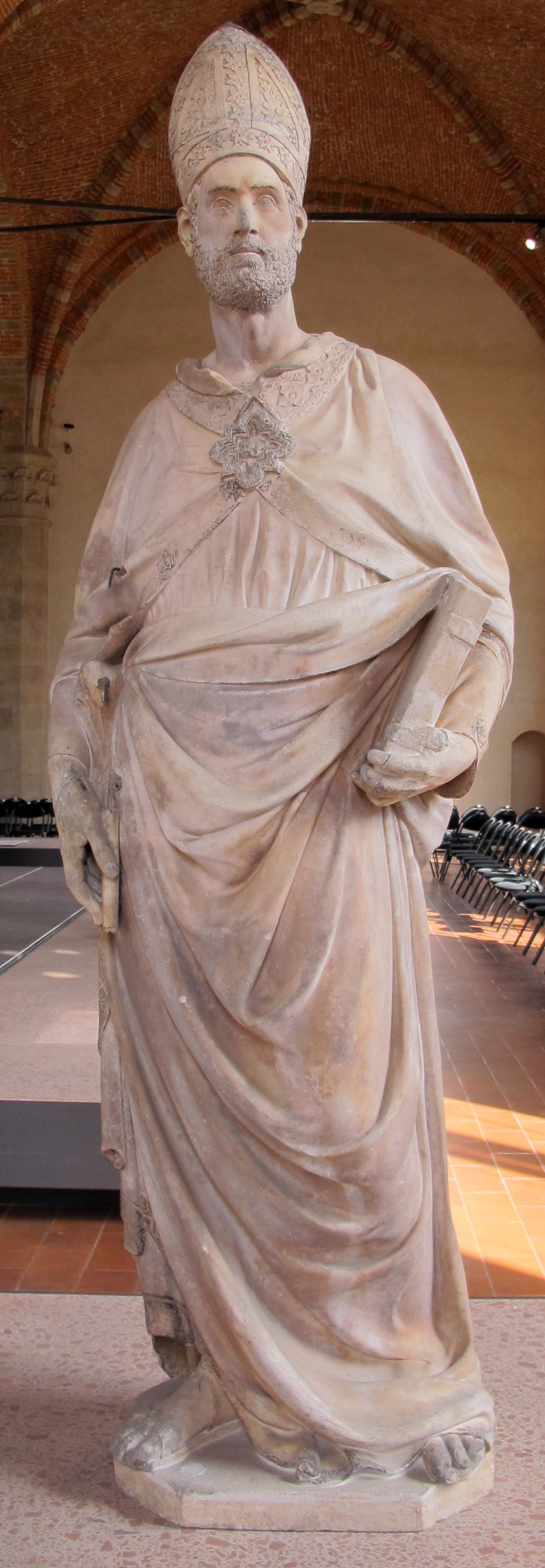

Saint Eligius is an Apuan marble statue of saint Eligius by Nanni di Banco, forming part of a cycle of fourteen patron saints of the Florentine guilds for the external niches of Orsanmichele. It was commissioned by the Arte dei Maniscalchi guild and completed around 1417–1421, although it took until around 1422 for it to be put up in its niche. That niche is now filled by a replica, with the original in the Museo di Orsanmichele.

== Bibliography ==
- (in Italian) Paola Grifoni, Francesca Nannelli, Le statue dei santi protettori delle arti fiorentine e il Museo di Orsanmichele, Quaderni del servizio educativo, Edizioni Polistampa, Firenze 2006.
