= San Carlo dei Lombardi =

Church building in Florence, Italy

Coordinates: 43°46′14″N 11°15′20″E

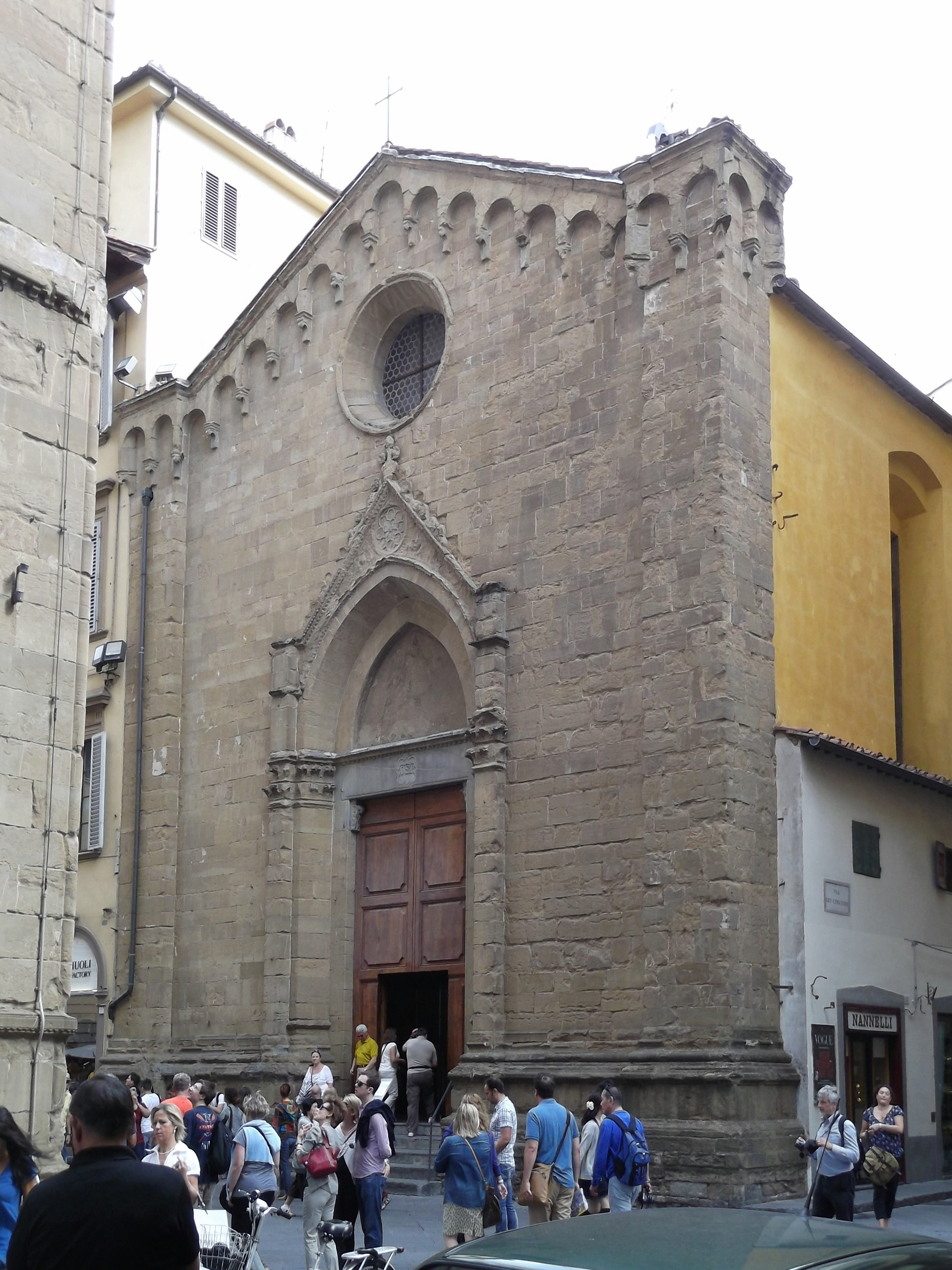
Facade of San Carlo

San Carlo dei Lombardi is a Gothic-style, Roman Catholic church located on Via dei Calzaiuoli in central Florence, region of Tuscany, Italy. It has undergone many refurbishments over the year, and was originally dedicated to Sant'Anna e Michele, but since the early 17th century became the church of the local Lombard community and was dedicated to St Charles Borromeo.

== History ==
A church at the site existed since the 8th century, but was razed in 1284. The church was erected by the Council of the Signoria in 1349 under the direction of Neri di Fioravante and Benci di Cione. It was dedicated to St Anne, mother of Mary, to celebrate the overthrow of the rule of the Walter VI, Count of Brienne, and so-called Duke of Athens on July 26, 1343, the calendar day of the saint. Construction concluded in 1404 under Francesco Talenti In 1616, the church was transferred to a confraternity of the Lombards, and the church was rededicated to Carlo Borromeo.

The Gothic facade built in pietra serena, a local sandstone, with a rose window above a portal with a pointed arch that leads to a single nave. It stands on Via dei Calzaiuoli opposite Orsanmichele, the historic economic center of Florence, assembly hall and church of the guilds and also a granary. San Carlo suffered grave humidity damage from the 1966 flood of the Arno river. The entryway has been outfitted in 2006 with an interior transparent portal allowing the doors to remain open to passers-by.

Below the vault at the center is a Deposition of Christ by Niccolò di Pietro Gerini (restoration completed 2015). The upper lunettes depict scenes of the Life of San Carlo (restoration complete in 2005). To the right of the modern main altar is a Presentation of Jesus to the Temple by Fabrizio Boschi. To the right in a gilded frame is a Glory of San Carlo (1616) by Matteo Rosselli (restoration completed in 2006). The right wall has a 14th-century polychrome wooden crucifix sculpted by Orcagna. The modern bronze statue below depicts the mystic San Pio of Pietrelcina, receiving as a young man the stigmata (2006) by Ceccarelli. To the assembly was added a case containing one of San Pio's gloves (2009).

The baptismal font is also modern (2007), made of bronze and pietra serena by the Armenian sculptor, Vighen Avetis. Behind is an Icon of Our Lady of Tenderness (Vergine della Tenerezza) by Nicole de Warlincourt. The bronze candelabra (2006) represents the burning bush of Moses.
