= Saint Stephen (Ghiberti) =

Sculpture by Lorenzo Ghiberti

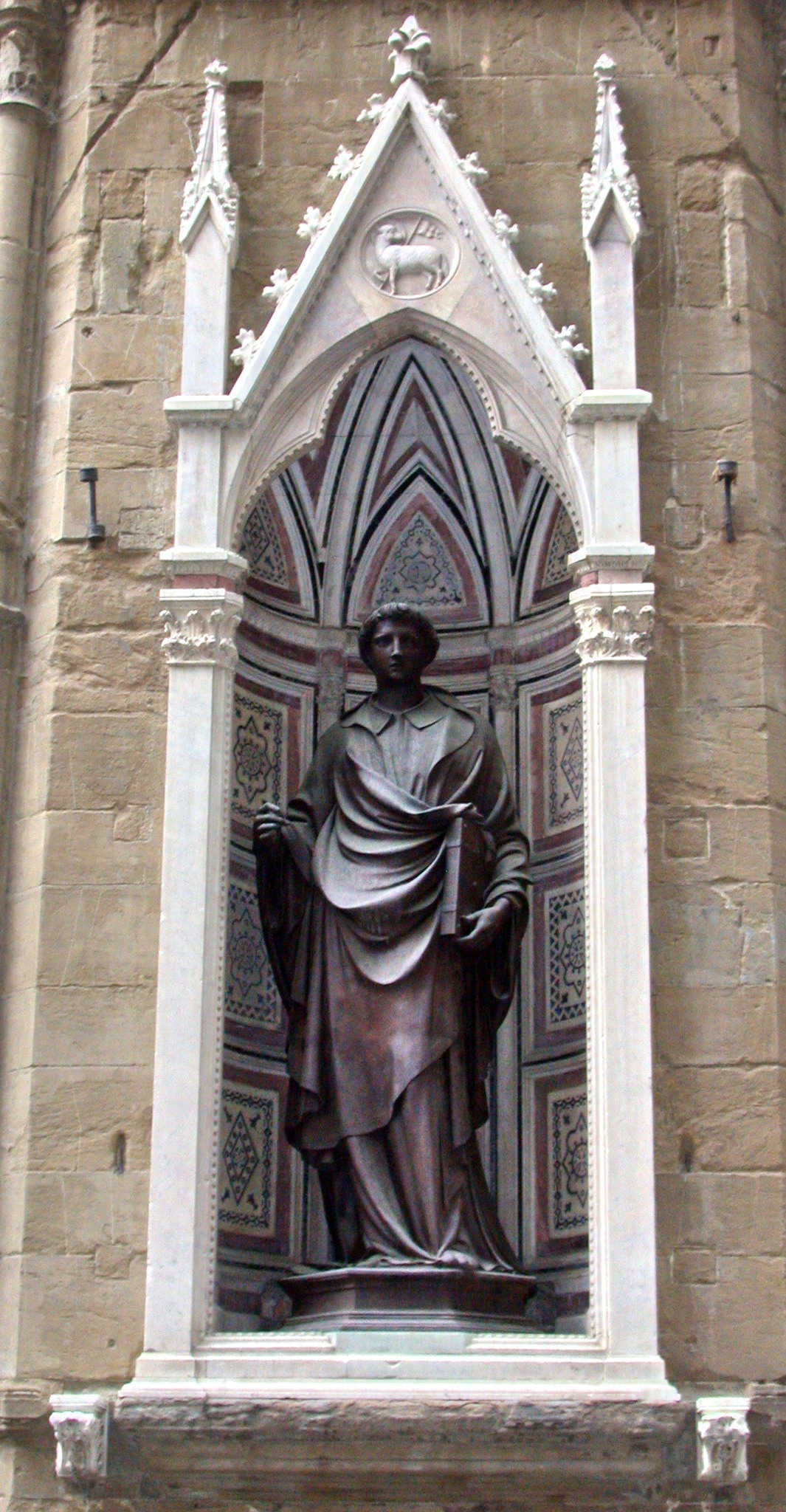
Replica in the niche.

Saint Stephen is a 2.6 m high bronze statue of saint Stephen by Lorenzo Ghiberti, completed for the Arte della Lana guild in 1427–28. It is now in the Museo di Orsanmichele, although a replica fills its original niche on the exterior of Orsanmichele, where it was one of a cycle of fourteen sculptures, each showing the patron saint of one of the guilds of Florence.

== Bibliography (in Italian) ==
- Paola Grifoni, Francesca Nannelli, Le statue dei santi protettori delle arti fiorentine e il Museo di Orsanmichele, Quaderni del servizio educativo, Edizioni Polistampa, Firenze 2006.
- Giulia Brunetti, Ghiberti, Sansoni, Firenze 1966.
