= Saint Mark (Donatello) =

Statue by Donatello

Coordinates: 43°46′14″N 11°15′17″E

St. Mark
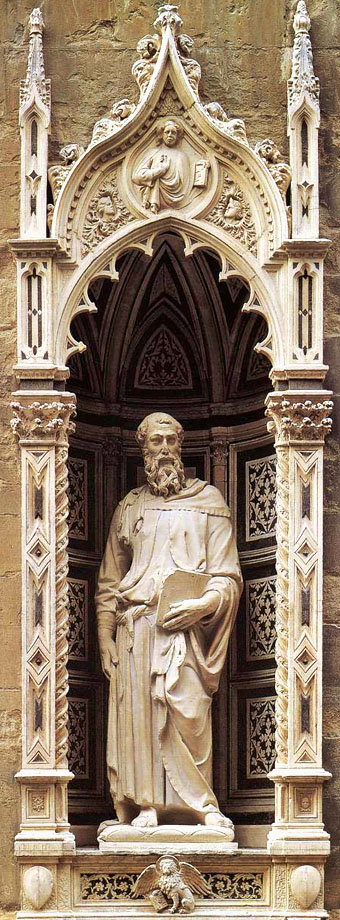
- Artist: Donatello
- Year: 1411–1413
- Type: Marble
- Dimensions: 236 cm (93 in)
- Location: Museo dell'Opera del Duomo (a copy can be found in Orsanmichele), Florence

Donatello's Saint Mark (1411–1413) is a marble statue that stands approximately 7 ft 9 in (2.36 m) high and is displayed in the museum of the Orsanmichele church, Florence. It originally was displayed in an exterior niche of the church, where a copy now stands. It depicts Mark the Evangelist.

Donatello was commissioned by the linen weavers' guild to complete three pieces for the project. St. Mark was the first of his contributions. The niche itself was not of Donatello's hand, but created most probably by two stone carvers named Perfetto di Giovanni and Albizzo di Pietro.

== Sculpture ==
Donatello's sculpture is notable for its detailed realism, evidence of the artist's skills. Even the veins of St. Mark's left hand are visible as he holds a text upon his hip. Contrapposto or natural pose, is used with Donatello's St. Mark. The saint has more weight on his right leg, his left knee is bent, and his torso is slightly twisted. The style is much more naturalistic than the symmetry and unrealistic nature of art from the Dark Ages. Also Donatello's sculpture differs from medieval works in the way that drapery is used, specifically in that St. Mark's figure is revealed by a realistic draping of linen.

According to Renaissance scholar Gene A. Brucker, Donatello's statue of St. Mark "is generally recognized as the first Renaissance monument." (Renaissance Florence, 244)

== Proportions ==
According to Vasari's text The Lives of the Artists, written 140 years after the completion of St. Mark, the linen workers' guild originally rejected the sculpture because it appeared unnatural when set at street level. This was due to proportion adjustments made for its final resting place in the niche, well above street level. The head and torso were made larger as they would be further away from the viewer.

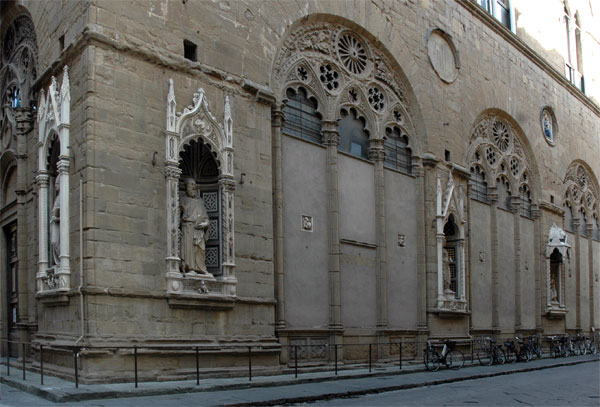
The copy viewed at street level

Donatello promised to make adjustments, so he covered the statue with a cloth, set the statue in the niche above the street, and without touching the statue for 15 days, once again revealed it to the guild. With its location above the viewer, the proportions looked perfect and the linen weaver's guild accepted the statue.

== Sources ==
- USAD – Art Resource Guide
- http://www.bluffton.edu/~sullivanm/orsanmichele/orsanmichele.html
- Giorgio Vasari, The Lives of the Artists, 1550
