= Francesco da Sangallo =

Italian sculptor

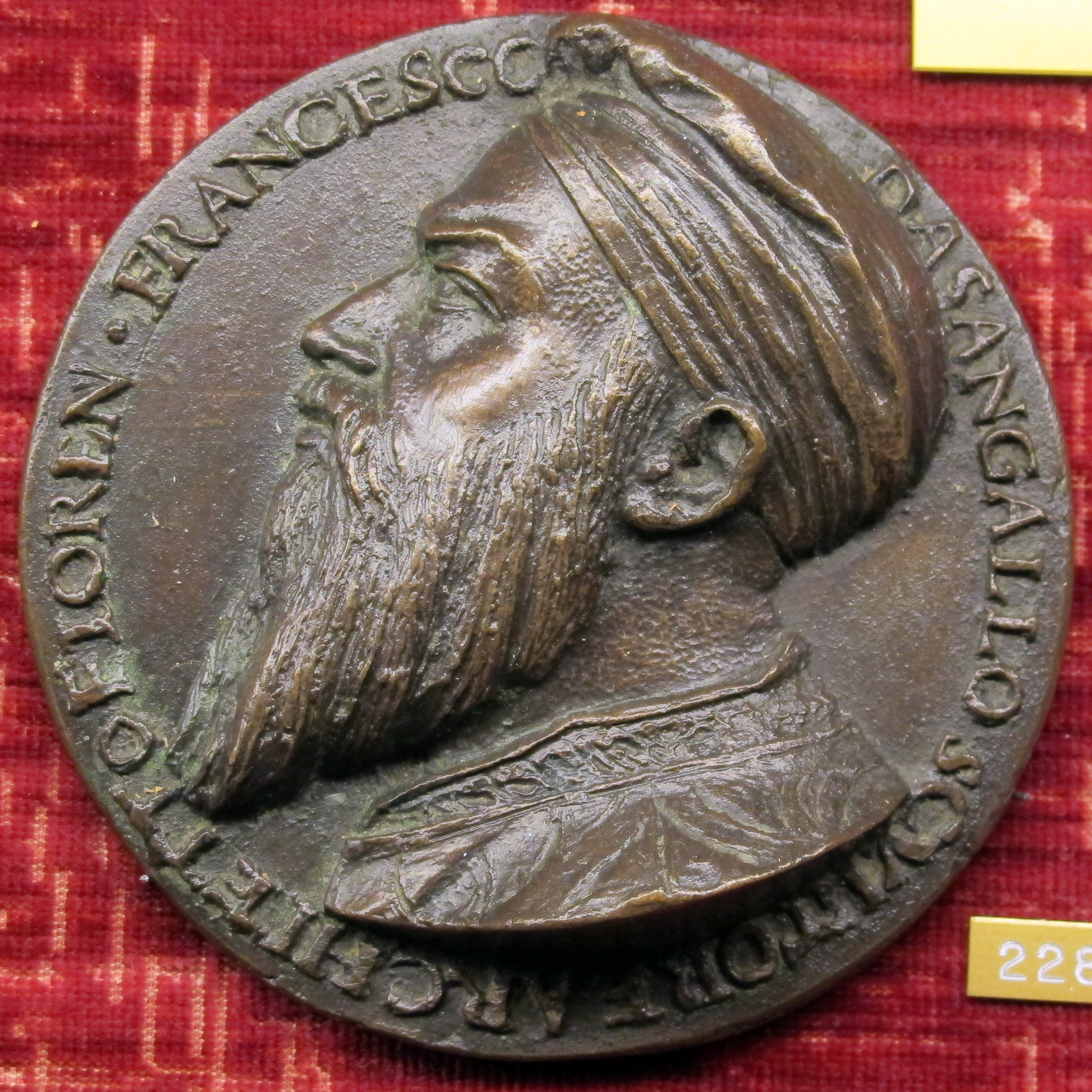
Medal with self-portrait of Francesco da Sangallo

Francesco da Sangallo (1494–1576) was an Italian Renaissance sculptor, the son of the architect and sculptor Giuliano da Sangallo.

Sangallo was born in Florence. His father took him at the age of ten to Rome where, in 1506, he was present at the identification of the Laocoön group, an event he described in a letter written in 1567, towards the end of his life. Francesco da Sangallo was a pupil of Andrea Sansovino. The earliest dated sculpture attributed to him is the "Virgin and Child with St. Anne" in Orsanmichele, Florence.

Sangallo was active in St. Peter's Basilica in Rome around 1542 and became Capomaestro and architect of the Duomo in Florence the following year. Among works by him in the church of Santa Maria Pimerana in Fiesole are a self-portrait in relief dated 1542 and his last work, a relief of Francesco del Fede. Other works include the effigy of Bishop Leonardo Bonafede, which lies on the pavement of the church of the Certosa near Florence, and the group of the Virgin and Child and St Anne, executed in 1526 for the altar of Orsanmichele. He was named a member (Accademico) of the prestigious Accademia delle Arti del Disegno of Florence, founded by Cosimo I de' Medici in 1563.
