= Saint Luke (Giambologna) =

Sculpture by Giambologna

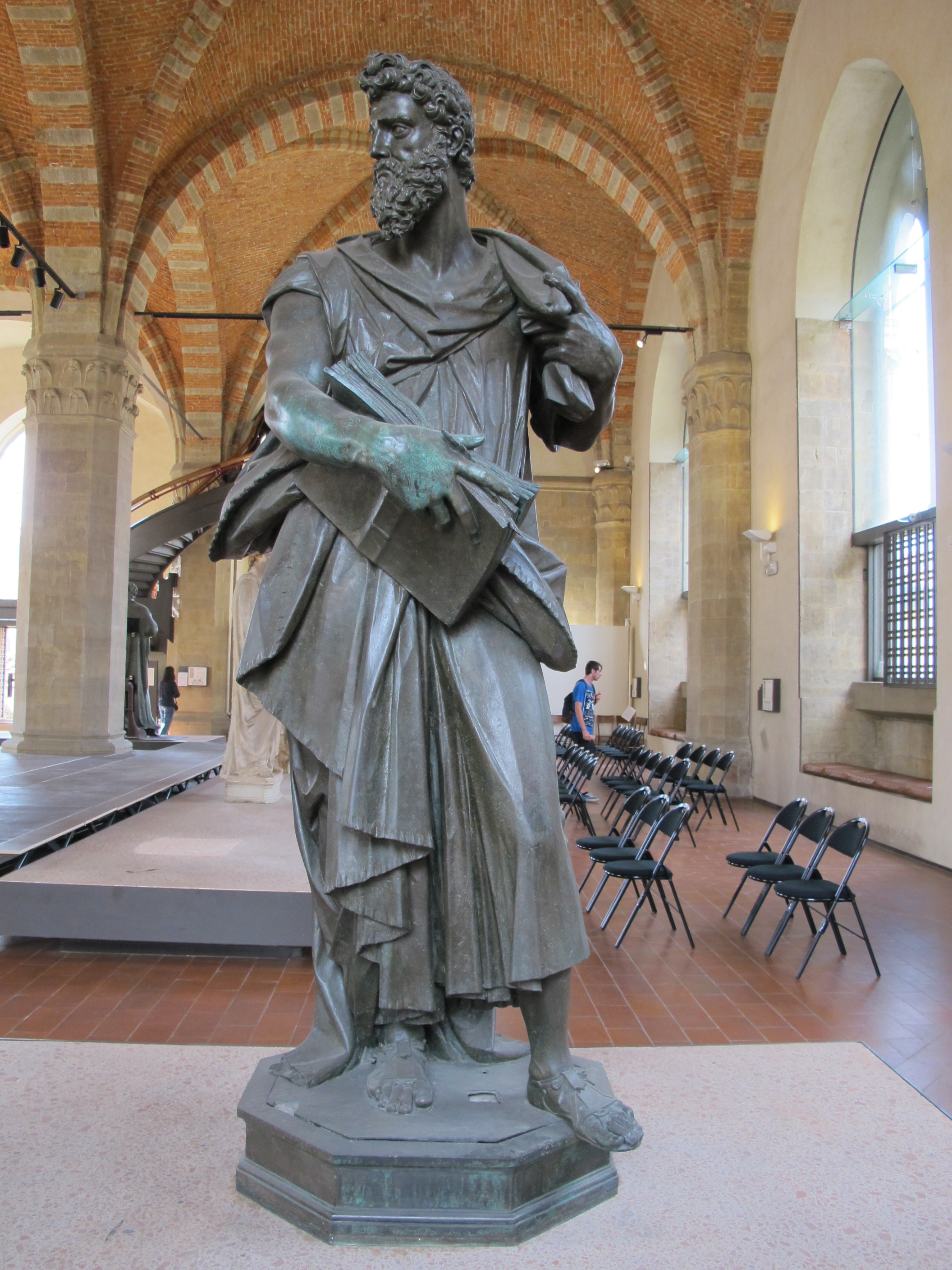
Saint Luke (1597-1602) by Giambologna

Saint Luke is a 2.73 m high bronze statue of Luke the Evangelist by Giambologna, commissioned by the Arte dei Giudici e Notai and completed in 1597–1602. One of a cycle of fourteen commissioned by the guilds of Florence for the external niches of Orsanmichele, it is now in the Museo di Orsanmichele, although a replica fills its original niche.

== Bibliography ==
- (in Italian) Paola Grifoni, Francesca Nannelli, Le statue dei santi protettori delle arti fiorentine e il Museo di Orsanmichele, Quaderni del servizio educativo, Edizioni Polistampa, Florence, 2006 (Italian).
