= Saint Matthew (Ghiberti) =

Sculpture by Lorenzo Ghiberti

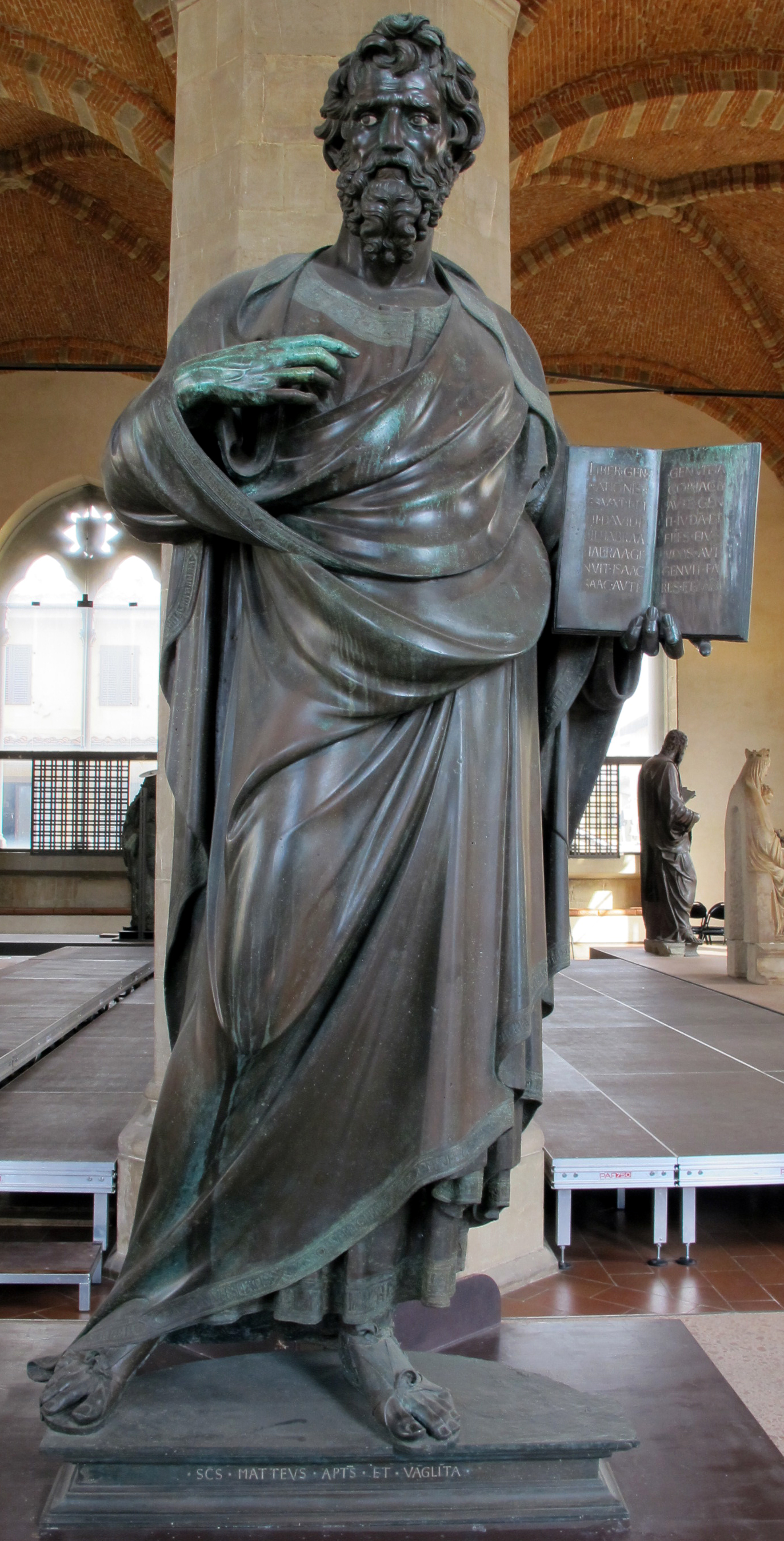

Saint Matthew is a 2.7-m high bronze statue of Saint Matthew by Lorenzo Ghiberti, completed in 1420 for the Arte del Cambio. One of a cycle of fourteen patron saints of the Florentine guilds commissioned for the external niches of Orsanmichele, it is now in the Museo di Orsanmichele.

== Bibliography (in Italian) ==
- Paola Grifoni, Francesca Nannelli, Le statue dei santi protettori delle arti fiorentine e ils Museo di Orsanmichele, Quaderni del servizio educativo, Edizioni Polistampa, Firenze 2006.
- Giulia Brunetti, Ghiberti, Sansoni, Firenze 1966.
