= Arte della Seta =

Silk Guild of Florence

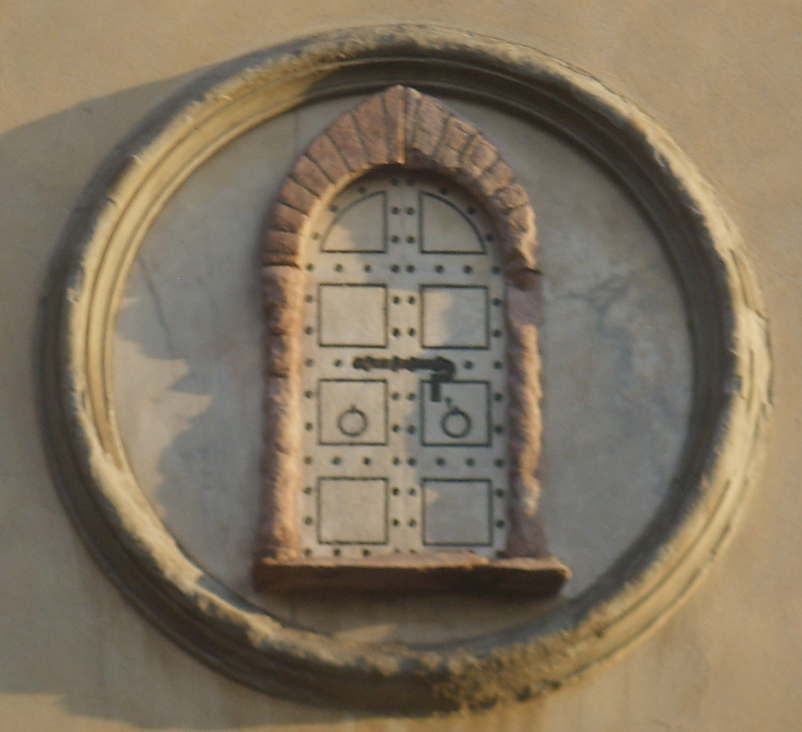
Stemma dell'Arte della Seta

The Arte della Seta was the Silk Guild of Florence in the Late Middle Ages and during the Renaissance.

As one of the seven Arti Maggiori ("major trades") of Florence, its members conducted their business throughout Italy and Europe, whereas the Arti Minori ("minor trades") were artisans and locally based. The Arte della Lana was the wool guild, also one of the Arti Maggiori.

== See also ==
- City Livery Company
- Zunft
