= Nicola di Pietro =

Italian painter

Nicola di Pietro (fl. late-14th century) was an Italian painter of the Renaissance period, active mainly in Tuscany.
