= Giovanni Battista di Pietro di Stefano Volponi =

Italian painter

Giovanni Battista di Pietro di Stefano Volponi (early 16th century) was an Italian painter of the Renaissance period. He was born in Pistoia, and painted in conjunction with il Sollazzino, and with Bernardino del Signoraccio for various churches of his native city. A painter from this family by the name of il Scalabrino was active around this time.
