= Luisa DiPietro =

American academic

Luisa A. DiPietro, DDS, PhD
- Education: University of Illinois at Chicago, University of Illinois at Urbana-Champaign
- Scientific career
- Fields: Dentistry, immunology
- Workplaces: University of Illinois at Chicago, Loyola University Medical Center

Luisa DiPietro is a faculty member at the University of Illinois at Chicago College of Dentistry. She is Director of the Center for Wound Repair and Tissue Regeneration and a Professor of Periodontics for the College.

DiPietro's interests in wound healing focus on the effects of aging and inflammation on scarring during healing. She investigates critical differences in inflammation and angiogenesis between oral versus cutaneous wounds that ultimately result in rapid, nonscarring healing in mucosa. From 2010 to 2011, she served as the president of the Wound Healing Society. In 2015, she was named a University Scholar of the University of Illinois.

DiPietro received her PhD in immunology and DDS from the University of Illinois at Chicago.
