= Niccolò di Piero Lamberti =

Italian sculptor (1370–1451)

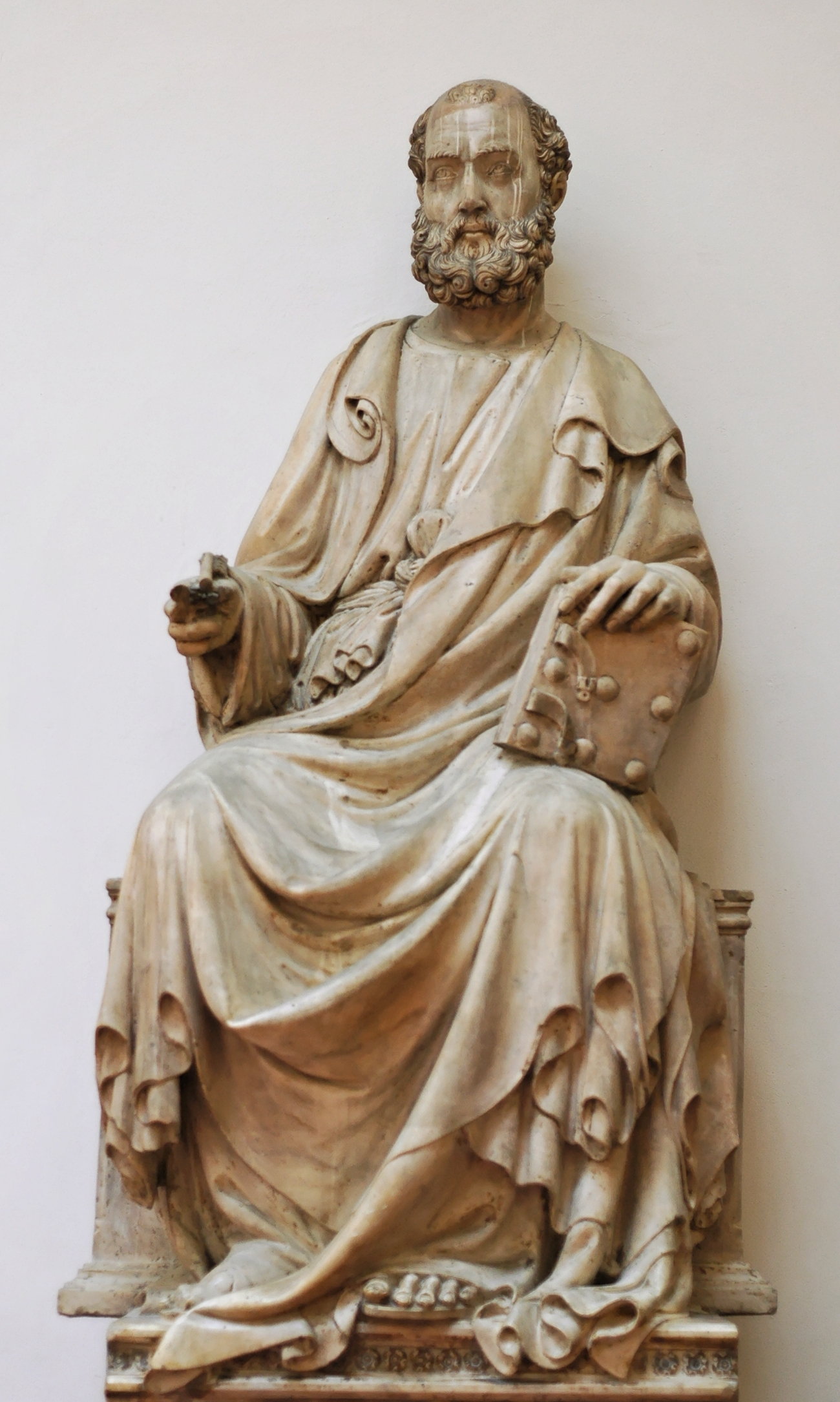
Niccolò di Piero Lamberti, Saint Mark (1410–1415), Museo dell'Opera del Duomo, Florence

Niccolò di Piero Lamberti (c. 1370 – 1451), also known as Niccolò di Pietro Lamberti, Niccolo Aretino, Niccolò d'Arezzo and il Pela, was an Italian Renaissance sculptor and architect. Little is known about his life other than that he was married in Florence in 1392. His son, Piero di Niccolò Lamberti (1393–1435), was also a sculptor, and the two are notable for exporting the Tuscan style of sculpture to Venice, where they were active in the late 1410s and 1420s.

By 1391 he was working on the Porta della Mandorla of the Florence Cathedral. In 1401 he was one of the artists who participated in the contest that was held to design the North doors of the Florence Baptistery, won by Lorenzo Ghiberti. In 1408 he was chosen as one of three sculptors to create one of the seated Evangelists (Saint Mark) for Florence Cathedral. This statue was completed in 1415 and is now in the Museo dell'Opera del Duomo. He was later active in both Venice and Bologna. In Venice, his significant role in the sculpture of the upper storey of the Saint Mark's Basilica façade is notable. In Florence, in addition to his statue of Saint Luke at Orsanmichele, he sculpted a Saint James the Major, on the southern façade for the Guild of Furriers and Skinners. Lamberti is also responsible for two series of capitals at Orsanmichele, one on the right side of the arcade of the eastern façade and one on the left side of the arcade of the southern façade.

== Sources ==
- Vasari, Giorgio (1568). Le Vite delle più eccellenti pittori, scultori, ed architettori. Vol. Part II (second ed.). Florence: Lorenzo Torrentino typographer. For the English translation by Gaston C. De Vere (1912–1915) see the website created by Adrienne De Angelis.
