= James of Ireland =

Franciscan friar (fl. 1316–1330)

James of Ireland, O.F.M. (fl. 1316–1330) was an Irish Franciscan friar and explorer.

== Biography ==
James of Ireland was the companion of Friar Odoric of Pordenone on his travels as far as Sumatra and China. After Odoric's death, the commune of Udine, (Friuli in north-eastern Italy), voted a sum of money to James for travelling with their fellow citizen.

== See also ==
- Catald
- Fulco of Ireland
- Ursus of Aosta
- Colman nepos Cracavist

== Sources ==
- A New History of Ireland, volume one, p. 981.
