= Emilian of Faenza =

Emilian of Faenza, Irish pilgrim and bishop, fl. 7th or 8th century.

== Biography ==
Emilian was an Irish bishop who died in Faenza, Italy, sometime in the 7th or 8th century. He was buried in the church of St. Clement in the town, his body been rediscovered in the 10th century, which led to its removal to what is now the parish church of St Emilian.

He is attributed with miracles banishing demonic possession, which led to a cult in his name, attested in 1139. He is commemorated on Nov. 6.

== See also ==
- Catald
- Fulco of Ireland
- Myles Keogh
- James Joyce
