= Fridianus =

Irish prince, bishop and hermit

Saint Fridianus
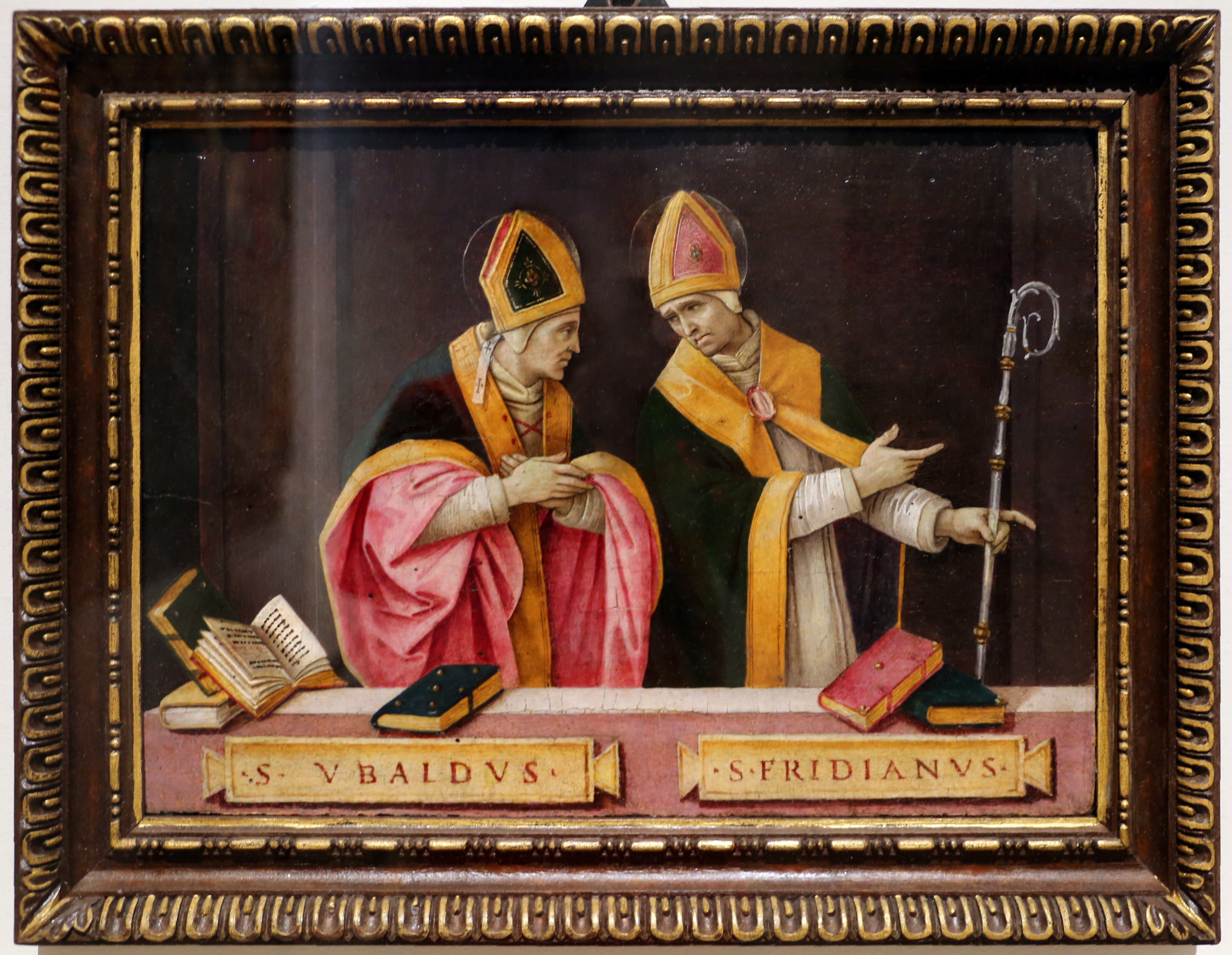
- Bishops and saints Ubaldus and Fridianus, Filippino Lippi, 1496

Bishop of Lucca
- Born: Ulster, Ireland
- Died: 588 AD; Lombard Kingdom, Italy
- Venerated in: Eastern Orthodox Church; Roman Catholic Church
- Canonized: Pre-Congregation
- Feast: March 18
- Attributes: rake, hoe

Fridianus (Italian: San Frediano, also Frigidanus, Frigidian, Frigianu), was an Irish prince and hermit, fl. 6th century. Tradition names him as a son of King Ultach of Ulster. He later migrated to Italy, where he was appointed as Bishop of Lucca. The Basilica of San Frediano in the city is dedicated to him, as are churches in Florence.

== Biography ==
According to Catholic tradition, he was a prince of Ireland. He went on a pilgrimage to Rome, and later became a hermit on Mount Pisano, near Lucca. The Catholic Encyclopedia states: “Remarkable for sanctity and miracles was St. Fridianus (560-88), son of Ultonius, King of Ireland, or perhaps of a king of Ulster (Ultonia).”

According to his legend, Fridianus was brought up trained in Irish monasticism, and was taught by St Enda and St Colman. He was later ordained a priest. During his pilgrimage to Rome, he decided to dedicate his life to God in solitude and became a hermit, living on Mount Pisano, a mountainous area between the cities of Lucca and Pisa. In 556 AD, Pope John II persuaded him to take the bishopric of Lucca, which Fridianus accepted. He would often return to the countryside to spend his time in quiet prayer and solitude.

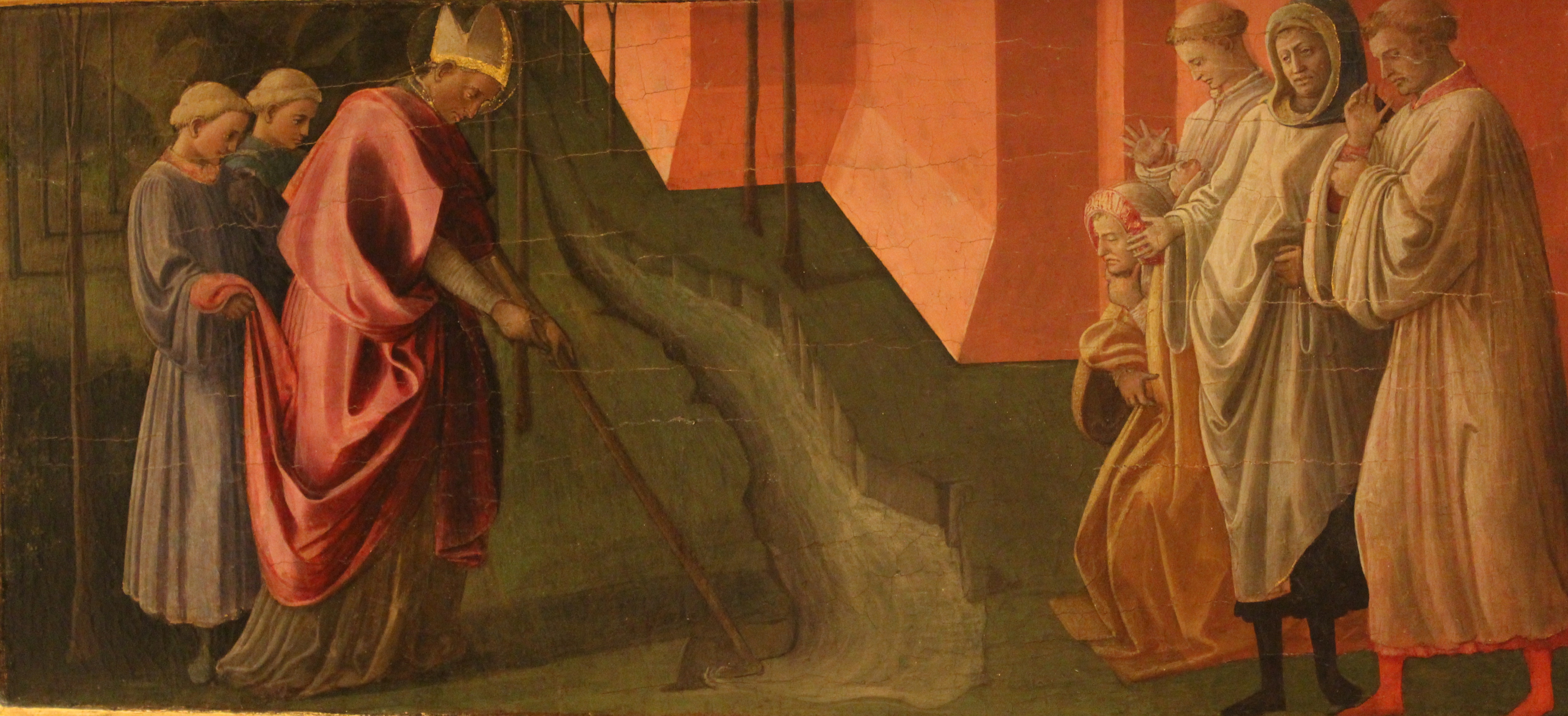
Filippo Lippi, St. Fridianus Changing the Course of the River Serchio, predella of the Barbadori Altarpiece, 1438. Uffizi, Florence

Fridianus became known for working miracles. His most famous one is considered a legend. The River Serchio, which ran past Lucca, often flooded the nearby city. The citizens became so distressed that they asked the bishop to come to their aid. Armed with a rake, Fridianus walked down to the river bank, and, strengthened by the prayers of the faithful, he commanded the waters of the Serchio to follow his rake. To the amazement of those gathered, the river followed Fridianus as he cut a path away from the city and the cultivated land on its outskirts.

During his episcopate, the city of Lucca was attacked by the Lombards. The cathedral was burnt down and Fridianus rebuilt it. He may also have founded a group of eremitical canon priests; these canons merged with the Canons Regular of the Lateran in 1507.

Fridianus had a church built on the spot of the present basilica, dedicated to Vincent of Saragossa, a martyr from Zaragoza, Spain. When Fridianus was buried in this church, the church was renamed as Ss. Frediano and Vincenzo. The church is now a major landmark and is regularly visited.

Fridianus is often confused with Finnian of Moville. But no formal connection has ever been made between the two.

== See also ==
- Pellegrino of Ireland
- Emilian of Faenza
- Saint Gall
- Christian monasticism
- List of Catholic saints
