= Barbadori Altarpiece =

1438 artwork by Filippo Lippi

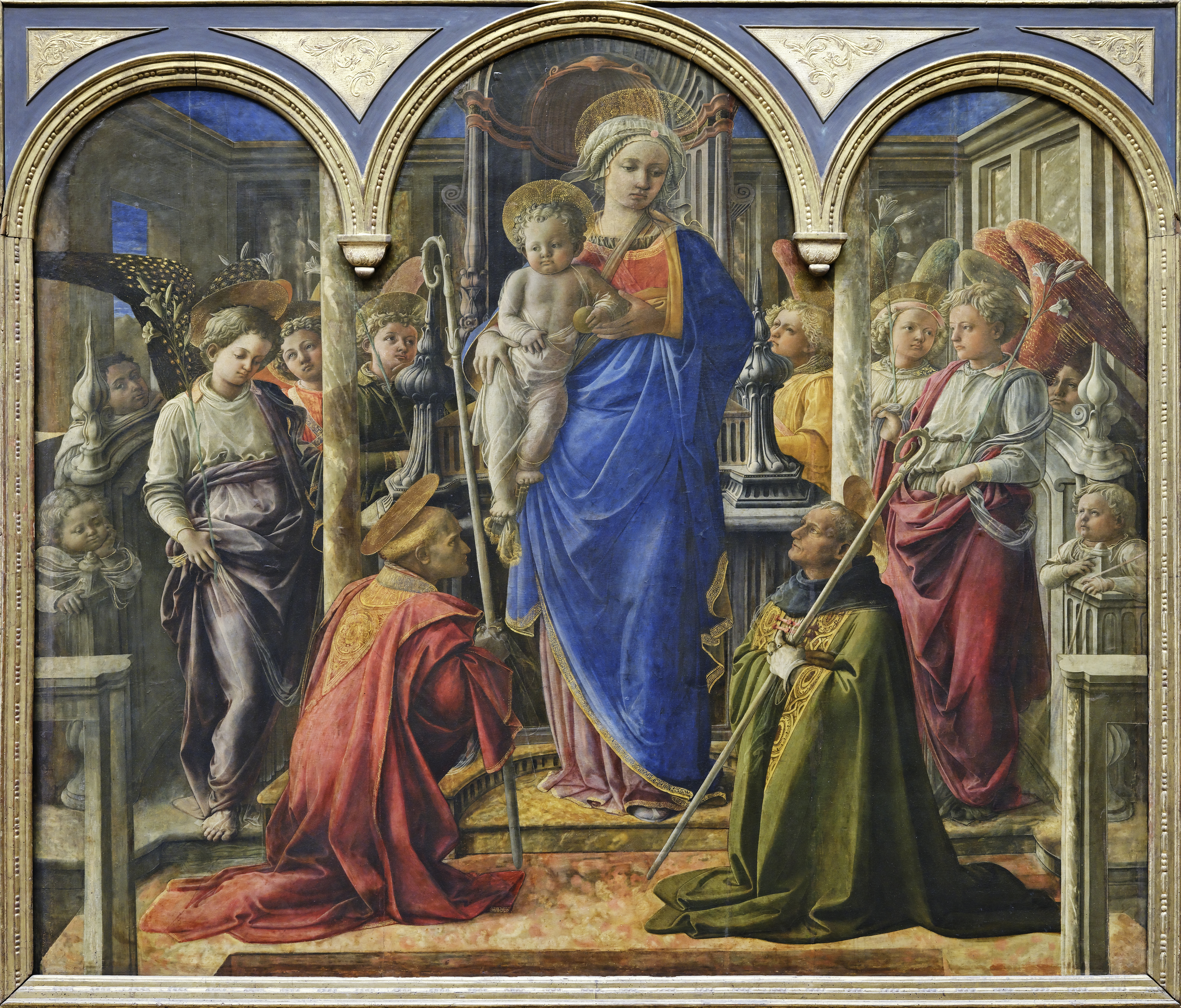
- Artist: Filippo Lippi
- Year: 1438
- Medium: oil on panel
- Dimensions: 208 cm × 244 cm (82 in × 96 in)
- Location: Louvre, Paris

The Barbadori Altarpiece is a polyptych painting by Filippo Lippi, commissioned in 1437 and completed in 1438. It consists of a main panel followed by a predella. The main panel, Virgin and Child Surrounded by Angels with St. Frediano and St. Augustine, is a sacra conversazione that contains flow between each figure to depict a coronation.

== History ==
Gherardo di Bartolomeo Barbadori was a wealthy man who belonged to the confraternity of Orsanmichele. In 1429, he died childless and left his wealth to the Captains of Orsanmichele. In his will he requested they build a chapel or altar in a church of their choice in Florence. His tomb was to be placed right below it and for Mass to be held. In 1437, Filippo Lippi was offered 40 florins to create an altarpiece at the Santo Spirito, dedicated to Saint Fridianus. The money was given as an allowance towards the materials for the artwork. Lippi did not earn much as profit from this piece.

By the first of April in 1438, Domenico Veneziano wrote a letter to Piero de' Medici claiming the altarpiece as having not been finished yet. However, he was writing from Perugia so it was more likely the information was not up to date. The first Mass was also not served until August 1439.

In 1810, the painting was disassembled and brought back to France by Napoleonic troops to repress religious guilds. After the 1815 restoration, it was not given back and is now housed in the Louvre Museum of Paris.

== Description ==
The panel follows the traditional polyptych format only in the upper part, where the arches divide the composition into different sections, like how different panels would be used in a traditional polyptych. Differently from previous works, Lippi painted the Virgin as standing, and made her the central point of the composition. The Virgin is seen in a contrapposto pose with a belt attaching her baby, Jesus, to her side. The size and placement of the figures is to show hierarchical importance. To achieve this, he experimented with depth of field by inserting items or people in the foreground and background.

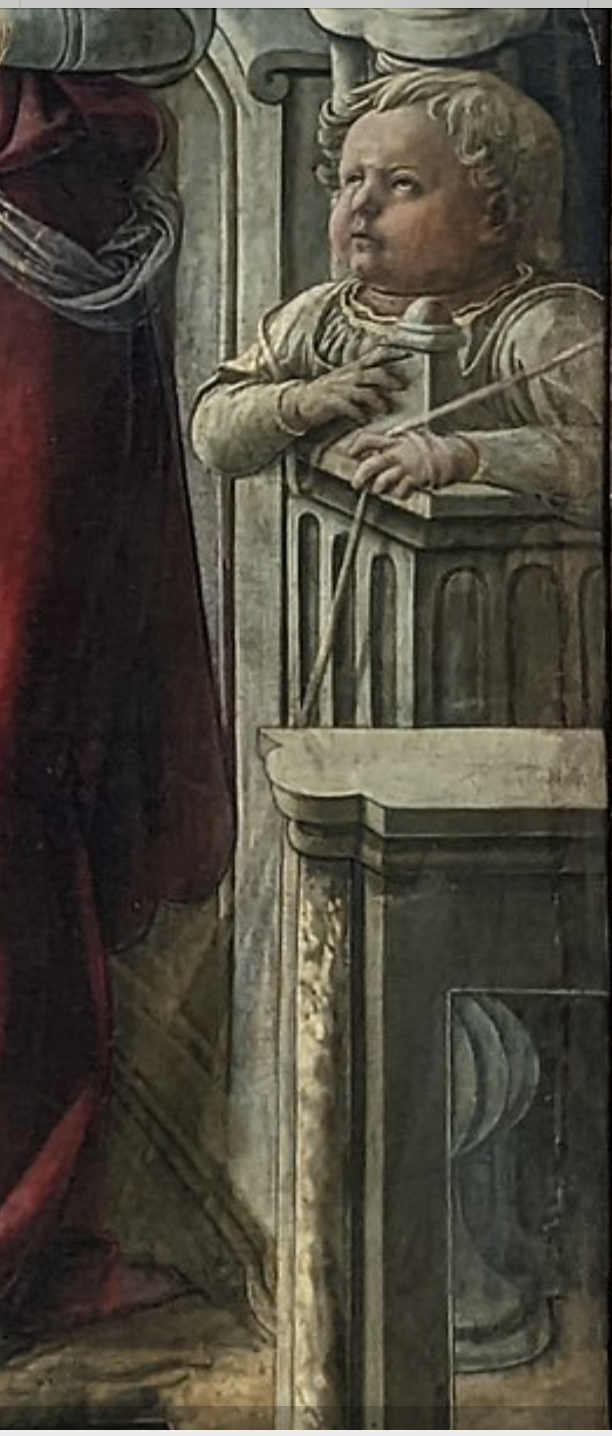
Faint textile

The kneeling saints are St. Augustine on the right and St. Fridianus on the left. On the far left is a self-portrait of Lippi, identified as the young monk behind the balustrade. He appears detached from the scene by keeping his eyes directly on the viewer. It is painted as a reminder to continue the focus on the sacred scene. It is said to also be reflection of Lippi fighting his own temptations or how he left the Carmelite in an untraditional fashion.

Filippo Lippi made some alterations to the altarpiece as the process continued, as seen by the faint fabric seen to the right of the work. He tested the boundaries of frame by creating architectural pieces that appear unstructured. Balusters were added after he had completed some of the architectural elements to enhance the relationship between the figure and the viewer. There is a stylized fabric constructed in a drooping fashion that is seen being held between two children. The lines lead the viewer back to the center of the image where the Virgin and her son stand. The visibility of the material is faint as it was later replaced by columns on the left and right to increase depth of field.

The lack of gesso incisions suggests that he wanted to wait to see the full potential of the work as a whole. The body of work strays away from the illusion of a window entering a three-dimensional world. To achieve this, Lippi places the columns out of alignment to the arch of the frame. The detachment draws the viewer back to the figures by covering the bottom of the posts with the two kneeling saints. This also allowed for the frame to be taken away from the artwork and it not affect the meaning of the work.

Located at the bottom of the painting, there appears to be a rectangular shadow. The hollow space is said to be a tomb shaped pit. It is possible Lippi was paying homage to the patron, Gherardo di Bartolomeo Barbadori.

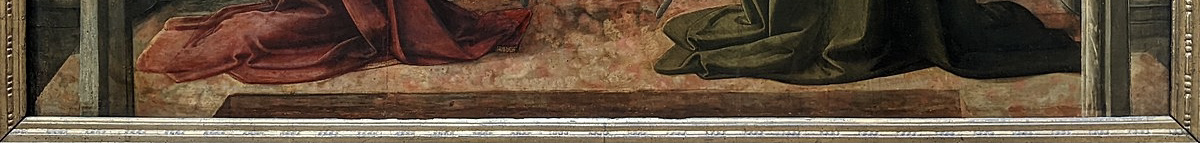
Barbadori tomb cavity

== Influence ==
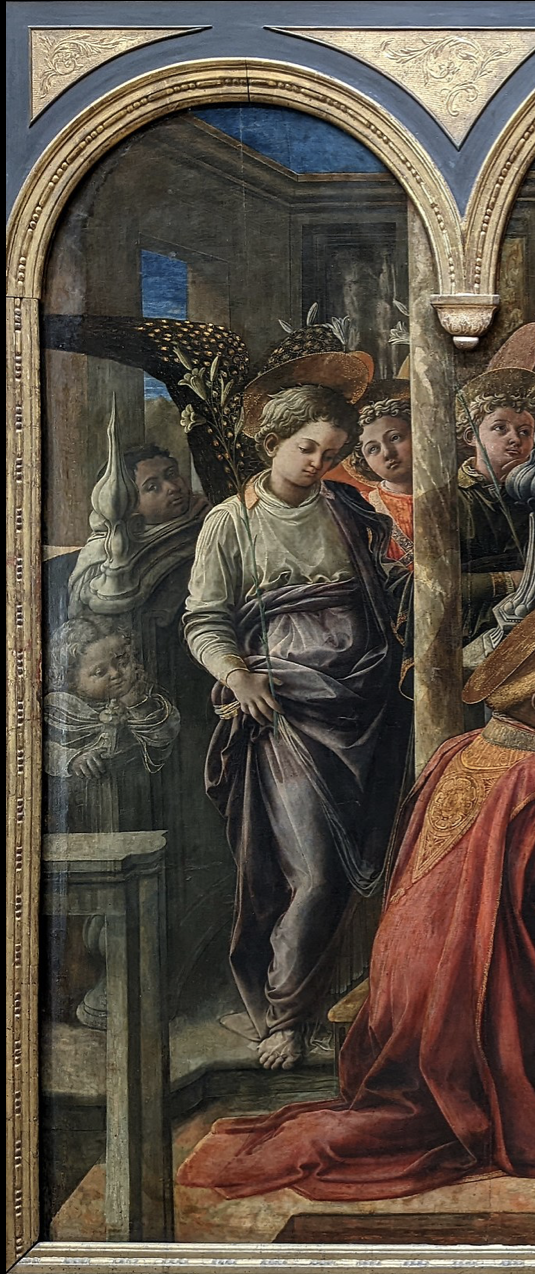
Angel holding garment

To the left of the painting, an angel is seen holding up the bottom of his attire. This figure is inspired by Quattro Santi Coronati by Nanni di Banco. It is a triple figure sculpture piece in a shell-shaped niched of the Orsanmichele. Fra Angelico introduced the idea of an architectural space that did not include gold. Instead it was given an opening to that resembled 15th century Flemish contemporary works and mimics Tribunale of the Mercanzie by Donatello. The landscape opening allows for it to be less spiritual and more slightly more humanizing.

The room has a singular window, creating an uneven objective weight. This style derived from contemporary Flemish paintings which relate to followers of Christ.

Depictions of the figures contain features similar to that of a late Gothic approach in the 1430s. However, there are more distinguishable characteristics on the individuals than that of Gothic style. Masaccio was one of the artists to guide Lippi's work towards a more statuesque style.

== Predella ==
The work was originally accompanied by a predella, which was returned to Florence after the fall of Napoleon and is now housed in the Uffizi Gallery. The original predella included three panels depicting St. Fridianus Changing the Course of the Serchio, Annunciation of the Death of the Virgin and Arrival of the Apostles, and St. Augustine's Vision of the Holy Spirit.

In his will, the patron requested to have St. Fridianus honored through an altar or chapel. The saint was admired for his dedication to God and restoring peoples faith. Thus, St. Fridianus Changing the Course of the Serchio was placed to the left of the predella. The scene depicted a story of the saint saving a neighboring town from the floods of the River Serchio. The painting discusses the power of faith and prayer. The central predella is a combination of two events, the Annunciation of the Death of the Virgin and Arrival of the Apostles. It is a reflection of the Orsanmichele's duty of preparing someone for their final moments through sacraments.

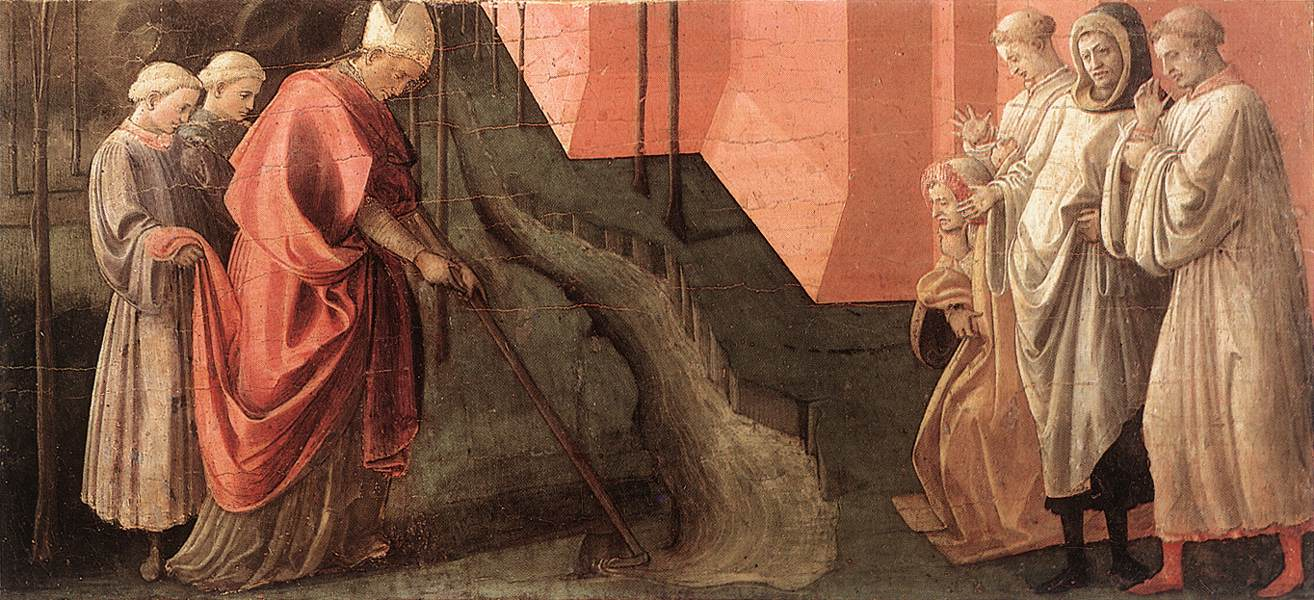
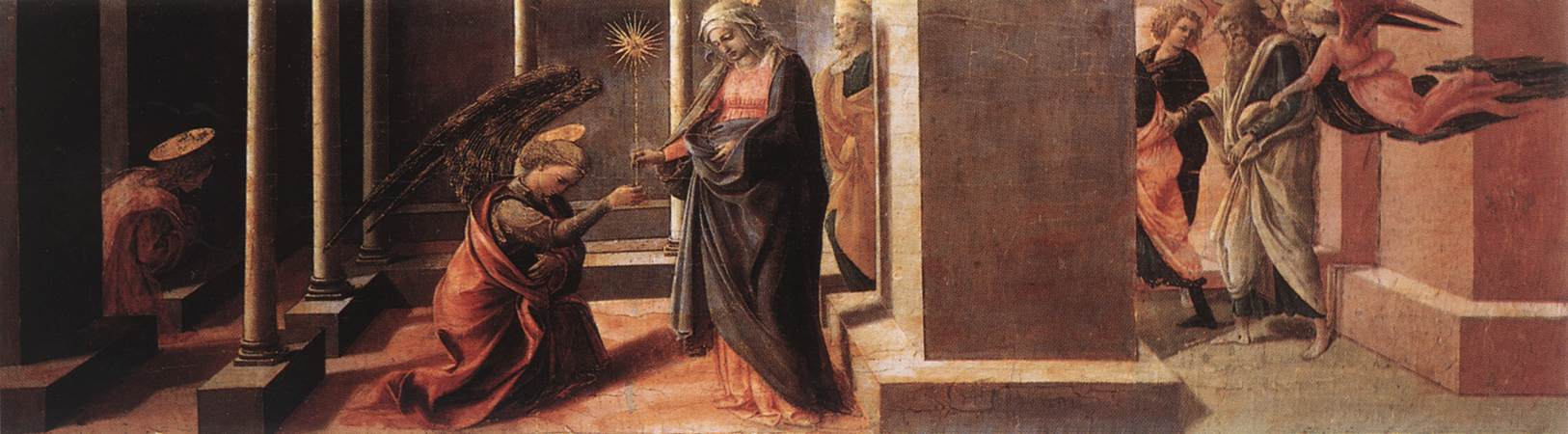
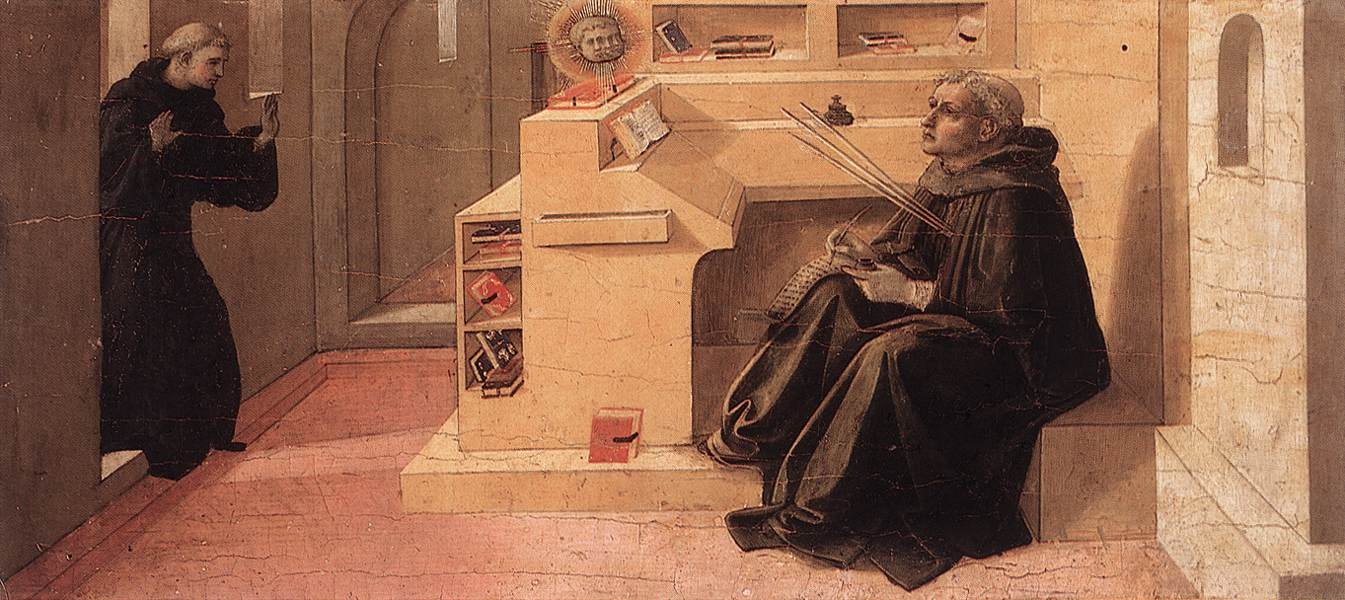

Predella of the Barbadori Altarpiece

== Condition ==
The work has a yellow varnish that accentuates the cracked paint. There are also two centimeters of cracks that appear on both sides of the panels that are a sign of restoration. The Virgin and St. Fridianus's faces in particular show aging in their color.
