= San Cataldo, Montenero Sabino =

Church in Lazio, Italy

San Cataldo is a Baroque-style, Roman Catholic church located in the town of Montenero Sabino, province of Rieti, region of Lazio, Italy. It lies at the opposite end of town from the Castle overlooking the town.

== History and description ==
The church is dedicated to Saint Catald of Taranto a canonized bishop, whose veneration is more prominent in the south, including Sicily. The church has a medieval layout and circular Romanesque apse, but the facade and interiors were refurbished in 1735. The interior has baroque stucco decoration and a 19th-century wooden icon of the virgin, called the Madonna della Maternità.
