= Pellegrino of Ireland =

Irish prince and hermit

Pellegrino of Ireland, Irish prince and hermit, fl. 7th-9th centuries. Returning from a pilgrimage to the Holy Land, he became a hermit in the mountain forests of Tuscany. His feast day is August 1.

== Biography ==
"Pellegrino" identifies him as a pilgrim; his original name is unknown. According to tradition, he was the son of an Irish king called Romanus, who had converted to the Christian faith. Forsaking his patrimony, he departed for the Holy Land, where he spent several years fasting in the desert. He was forced to leave after a dispute with a local ruler, removing to Italy, where he lived in the Apennines as a hermit till the age of ninety-seven.

Many miracles were attributed to him, resulting in an oratory being built over the site of his remains.

== Veneration ==
The earliest mention of the church of San Pellegrino in Alpe dates from the early twelfth century. A hospice for pilgrims was built alongside the church. His legend, which contains many motifs found in the vita of other saints, was composed later.

San Pellegrino, is a patron of those traveling to Rome along the pilgrimage routes. His cult spread throughout the Tuscan Apennines. The church of San Pellegrino in Lucca was the starting-point of a pilgrimage held every three years to San Pellegrinto del Alpi.

== See also ==
- Andrew the Scot
- Fridianus
- Muiris Ó Fithcheallaigh
- Luke Wadding

== Sources ==
- Tommasini, Anselmo. Irish Saints in Italy, translated by J.F. Scanlan, London, 1937
