= Four Crowned Martyrs =

Martyrs and saints in Early Christianity

The Four Crowned Martyrs
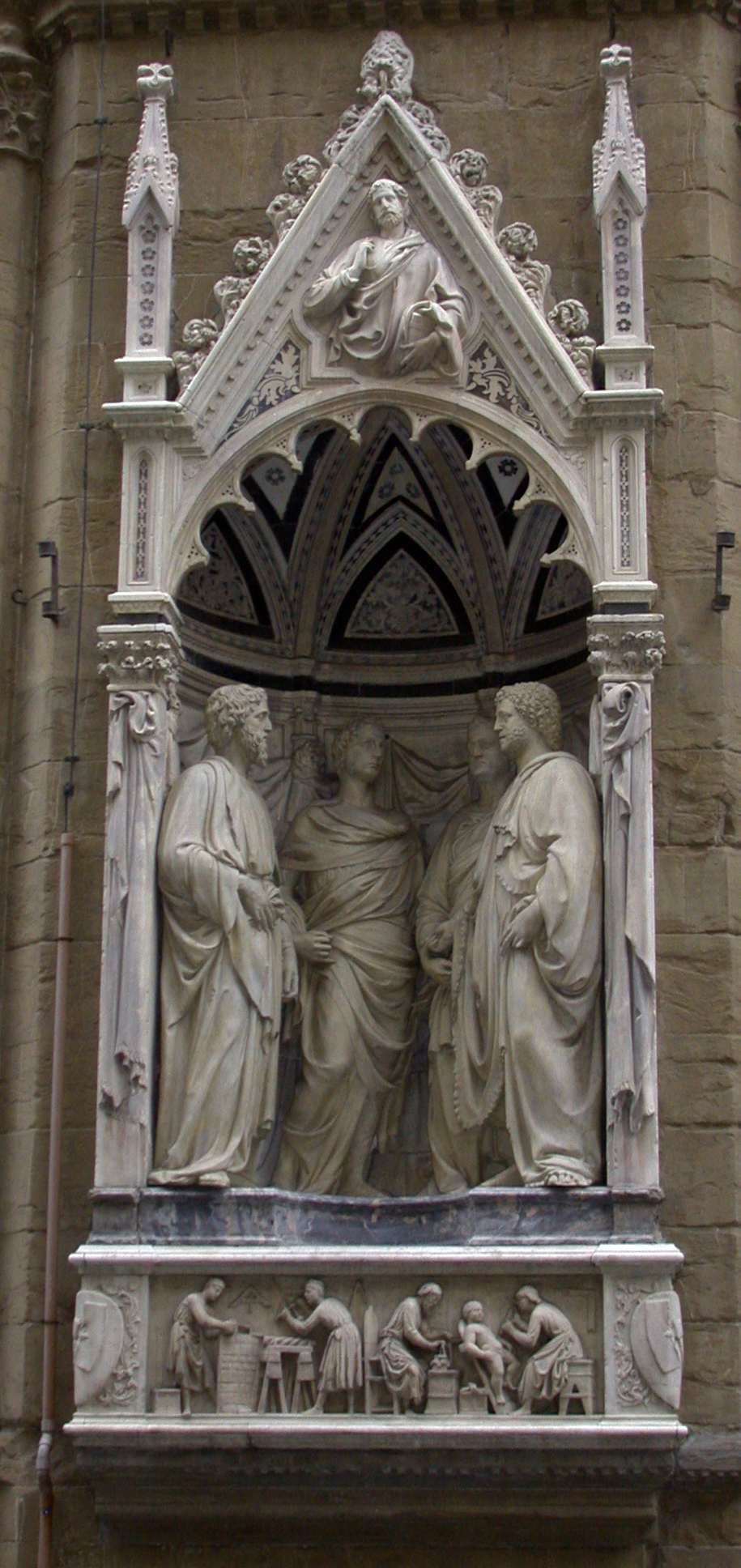
- The Four Crowned Martyrs, Nanni di Banco, Orsanmichele, Florence, ca. 1415.

Martyrs
- Born: 3rd century AD
- Died: between 287 and 305 Castra Albana (1st Group); Sava River, Pannonia (2nd Group)
- Venerated in: Catholic Church; Eastern Orthodox Church; Oriental Orthodoxy; Anglican Communion
- Major shrine: Santi Quattro Coronati, Rome, Italy
- Feast: August 8 (Group 1); November 8 (Group 2)
- Patronage: sculptors, stonemasons, stonecutters; against fever; cattle

The Four Crowned Martyrs or Four Holy Crowned Ones (Latin, Sancti Quatuor Coronati) were nine individuals who are venerated as martyrs and saints of Early Christianity. The nine saints are divided into two groups:

1. Severus (or Secundius), Severian(us), Carpophorus (Carpoforus), Victorinus (Victorius, Vittorinus)
2. Claudius, Castorius, Symphorian (Simpronian), Nicostratus, and Simplicius

According to the Golden Legend, the names of the members of the first group were not known at the time of their death "but were learned through the Lord’s revelation after many years had passed." They were called the "Four Crowned Martyrs" because their names were unknown ("crown" referring to the crown of martyrdom).

== First group ==
Severus (or Secundius), Severian(us), Carpophorus, and Victorinus were martyred at Rome or Castra Albana, according to Christian tradition.

According to the Passion of Saint Sebastian, the four saints were soldiers (specifically cornicularii, or clerks, in charge of all the regiment's records and paperwork) who refused to sacrifice to Aesculapius, and therefore were killed by order of Emperor Diocletian (284–305), two years after the death of the five sculptors, mentioned below. The bodies of the martyrs were buried in the cemetery of Santi Marcellino e Pietro on the fourth mile of the Via Labicana by Pope Miltiades and Saint Sebastian (whose skull is preserved in the church).

== Second group ==
The second group, according to Christian tradition, were sculptors from Sirmium who were killed in Pannonia. They refused to fashion a pagan statue for the Emperor Diocletian or to offer sacrifice to the Roman gods. The Emperor ordered them to be placed alive in lead coffins and thrown into the Sava River in about 287. Simplicius was killed with them. According to the Catholic Encyclopedia,

[T]he Acts of these martyrs, written by a revenue officer named Porphyrius probably in the fourth century, relates of the five sculptors that, although they raised no objections to executing such profane images as Victoria, Cupid, and the Chariot of the Sun, they refused to make a statue of Æsculapius for a heathen temple. For this they were condemned to death as Christians. They were put into leaden caskets and drowned in the River Save. This happened towards the end of 305.

The references in the text of the martyrs' passio to porphyry quarrying and masonry located at the 'porphyritic mountain' indicate that the story's setting is misplaced; there are no porphyry quarries in Pannonia and the only porphyry quarry worked in the ancient world is in Egypt. Mons Porphyrites was quarried to supply the rare and expensive imperial porphyry for the emperor's building works and statuary, for which it was exclusively set aside. Mons Porphyrites is in the Thebaid, which was a centre of Christian erimiticism in Late Antiquity. Emperor Diocletian did indeed commission the extensive use of porphyry in his many building projects. Diocletian also visited the Thebaid during his reign, though he was more usually associated with the Balkans, which might explain why the story's location was transposed to Pannonia over time.

== Joint veneration ==
When the names of the first group were learned, it was decreed that they should be commemorated with the second group. The bodies of the first group were interred by St. Sebastian and Pope Melchiades (Miltiades) at the fourth milestone on the Via Labicana, in a sandpit where there rested the remains of other executed Christians.

It is unclear where the names of the second group actually come from. The tradition states that Melchiades asked that the saints be commemorated as Claudius, Nicostratus, Simpronian, and Castorius. These same names actually are identical to names shared by converts of Polycarp the priest, in the legend of St. Sebastian. According to the Catholic Encyclopedia, however, "this report has no historic foundation. It is merely a tentative explanation of the name Quatuor Coronati, a name given to a group of really authenticated martyrs who were buried and venerated in the Catacomb of Saints Marcellinus and Pietro, the real origin of which, however, is not known. They were classed with the five martyrs of Pannonia in a purely external relationship."

The bodies of the martyrs are kept in four ancient sarcophagi in the crypt of Santi Marcellino e Pietro. According to a lapid dated 1123, the head of one of the four martyrs is buried in Santa Maria in Cosmedin.

== Confusion and conclusions ==
The rather confusing story of the four crowned martyrs was well known in Renaissance Florence, principally as told in the thirteenth-century Golden Legend by Jacopo da Voragine (though their feast day may have been kept earlier, as in the Parc Gradual). It appears that the original four martyrs were beaten to death by order of Emperor Diocletian (r. AD 284–305). Their story became conflated with that of a group of five stonecarvers, also martyred by Diocletian for refusing to carve the image of a Roman god. Due to their profession as sculptors, the five early Christian martyrs were an obvious choice for the guild of stonemasons, but their number seems often to have been understood to be four, as in this case.

Problems arise with determining the historicity of these martyrs because one group contains five names instead of four. Alban Butler believed that the four names of group one, which the Roman Martyrology and the Breviary say were revealed as those of the Four Crowned Martyrs, were borrowed from the martyrology of the Diocese of Albano Laziale, which kept their feast on August 8, not November 8. These four "borrowed" martyrs were not buried in Rome, but in the catacomb of Albano; their feast was celebrated on August 7 or August 8, the date under which is cited in the Roman Calendar of Feasts of 354. The Catholic Encyclopedia wrote that the "martyrs of Albano have no connection with the Roman martyrs".

The double tradition may have arisen because a second passio had to be written. It was written to account for the fact that there were five saints in group two rather than four. Thus, the story concerning group one was simply invented, and the story describes the death of four martyrs, who were soldiers from Rome rather than Pannonian stonemasons. The Bollandist Hippolyte Delehaye calls this invented tradition "l'opprobre de l'hagiographie" (the disgrace of hagiography).

Delehaye, after extensive research, determined that there was actually only one group of martyrs – the stonemasons of group two – whose relics were taken to Rome. One scholar has written that "the latest research tends to agree" with Delehaye's conclusion.

The most recent edition of the Roman Martyrology gives Simpronianus, Claudius, Nicostratus, Castorius and Simplicius, described as marble masons, as the martyrs celebrated on November 8, and the Albano martyrs Secundus, Carpophorus, Victorinus and Severianus as celebrated on August 8.

== Basilica of Santi Quattro Coronati ==
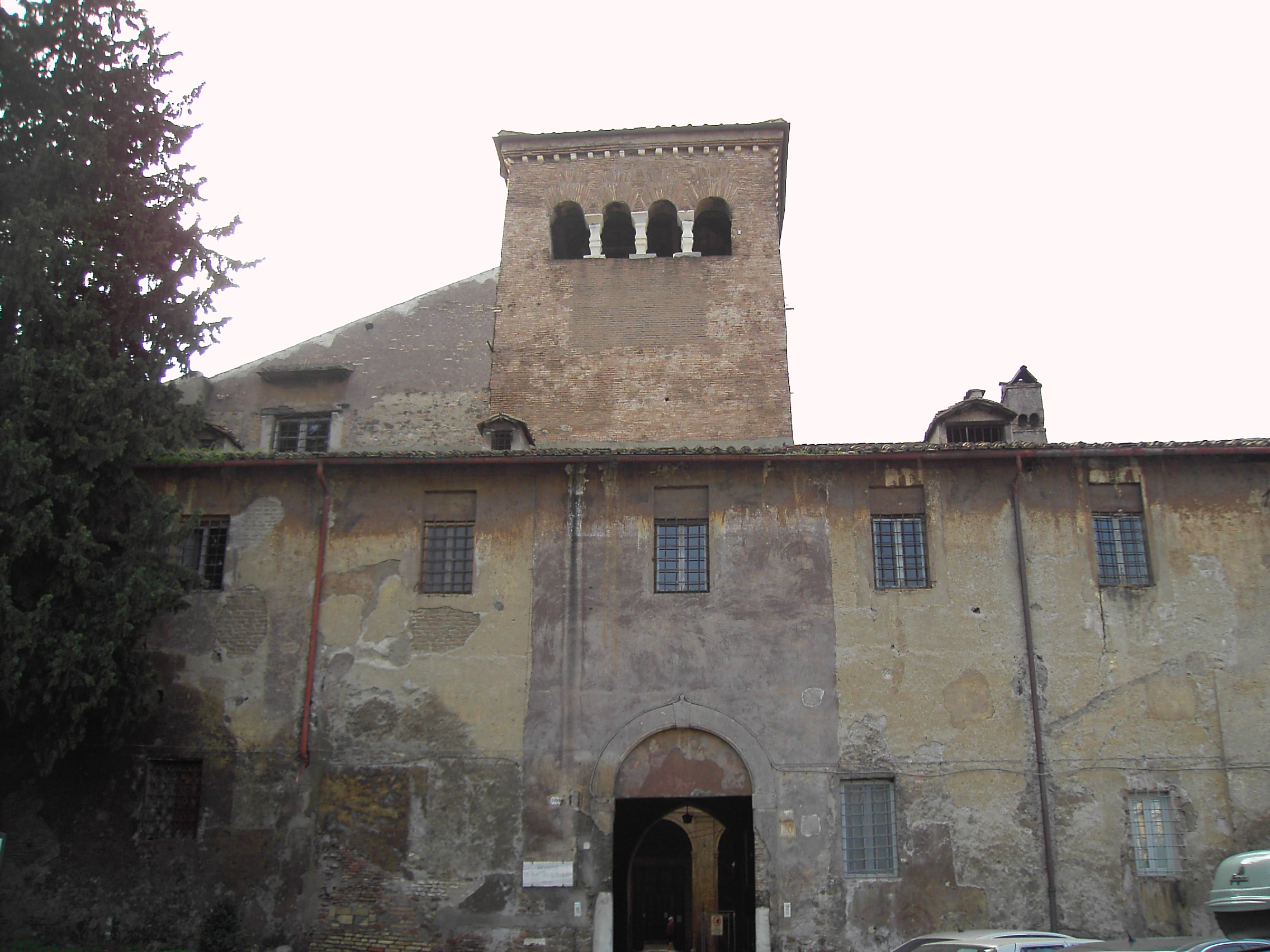
Basilica of Santi Quattro Coronati.

In the fourth and fifth centuries a basilica was erected and dedicated in honor of these martyrs on the Caelian Hill, probably in the general area where tradition located their execution. This became one of the titular churches of Rome, and was restored several times.

== Veneration ==
External videos
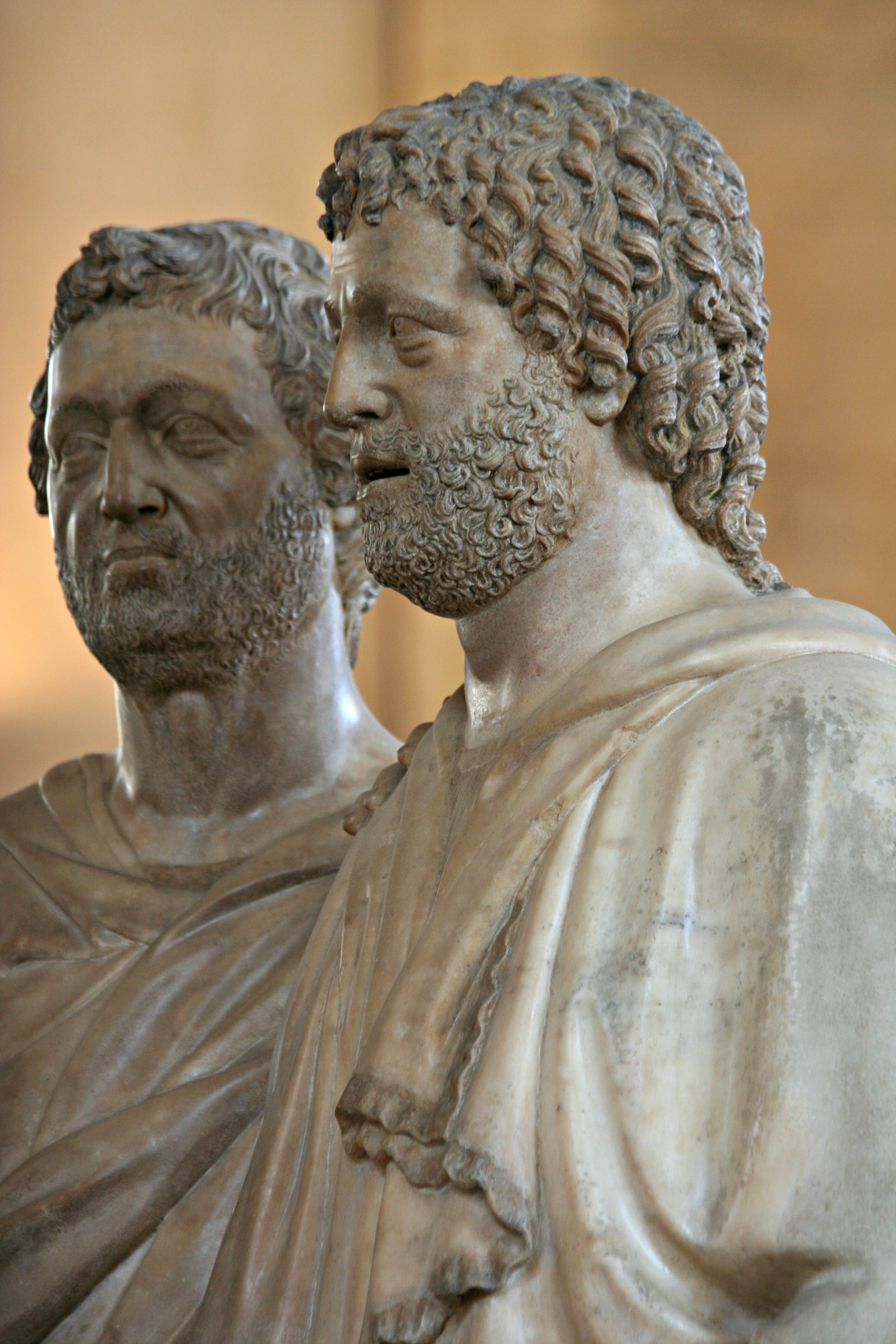
- Nanni di Banco's Four Crowned Saints, (3:21) Smarthistory

The Four Crowned Martyrs were venerated early in England, with Bede noting that there was a church dedicated to them in Canterbury. This veneration can perhaps be accounted by the fact that Augustine of Canterbury came from a monastery near the Basilica of Santi Quattro Coronati in Rome, or because their relics were sent from Rome to England in 601. Their connection with stonemasonry in turn connected them to the Freemasons. One of the scholarly journals of English Freemasons is called Ars Quatuor Coronatorum, and the Stonemasons of Germany adopted them as patron saints of "Operative Masonry."

== The Passio sanctorum quatuor coronatorum ==
The translation of the Four Crowned Martyrs to the church on the Caelian Hill is recorded in the Liber Pontificalis among the acts of Pope Leo IV (847–855). The main biographical source is the Latin Passio sanctorum quatuor coronatorum (Passion of the Four Crowned Martyrs), mentioned in the martyrology of Ado of Vienne (d. 875) and then in the more concise version of Usuard (d. 876/877). The latter was the most widely circulated in subsequent centuries, and contributed to the spread of the martyrs' veneration during the Middle Ages. Usuard referred to two sets of saint martyrs: the Quattuor Coronatorum and the set with Claudius, Nicostratus, Simpronianus, Castorius and Simplicius.

In the 10th century, Archbishop of Naples Peter published a Passio which was historically remarkable for a similar structure and textual style, and for some differences with regard to the content. The Abbacy of Saint Mary of Grottaferrata preserved a Greek manuscript of the Passio which had some concerns with the Neapolitan document. In 1910, the Jesuit philologist Hippolyte Delehaye published a commentary of the Four Crowned Martyrs' Passio in the work entitled Acta Sanctorum. The Passio had been also studied by the mediaevalists Wilhelm Wattenbach and Giovanni Battista De Rossi.

== Depictions ==
Around 1385, they were depicted by Niccolò di Pietro Gerini. Then in about 1415, Nanni di Banco fashioned a sculpture grouping the martyrs after he was commissioned by the Maestri di Pietra e Legname, the guild of stone and woodworkers, of which he was a member. These saints were the guild's patron saints. The work can be found in the Orsanmichele, in Florence. Finally, they were also depicted by Filippo Abbiati.

== See also ==
- List of Catholic saints
