= Four Crowned Martyrs (Nanni di Banco) =

Sculptural group by Nanni di Banco

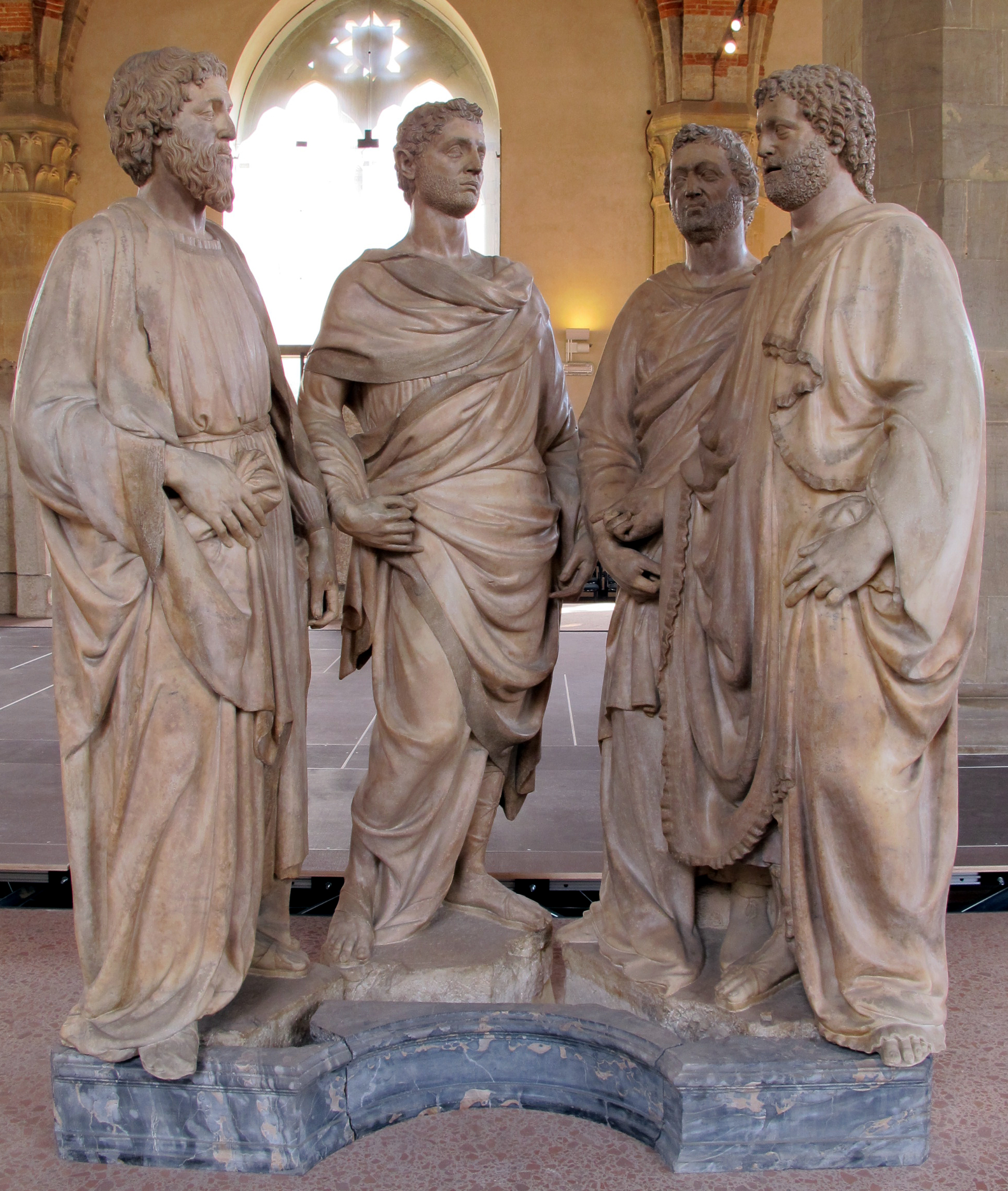

Four Crowned Martyrs is a sculptural group by Nanni di Banco. It forms part of a cycle of fourteen sculptures commissioned by the guilds of Florence for external niches of Orsanmichele, each sculpture showing that guild's patron saint. This sculpture was commissioned by the Arte dei Maestri di Pietra e Legname and completed around 1410–1412. It is in Apuan marble and is made of four figures of the Four Crowned Martyrs, the tallest of which is 2.03 m high. It is now indoors in the Museo di Orsanmichele, although a copy fills its original niche.

== Sources (in Italian) ==
- Paola Grifoni, Francesca Nannelli, Le statue dei santi protettori delle arti fiorentine e il Museo di Orsanmichele, Quaderni del servizio educativo, Edizioni Polistampa, Firenze 2006.
- Pierluigi De Vecchi ed Elda Cerchiari, I tempi dell'arte, volume 2, Bompiani, Milano 1999. ISBN 88-451-7212-0
