= Montenero Sabino =

- Comune
- Comune di Montenero Sabino
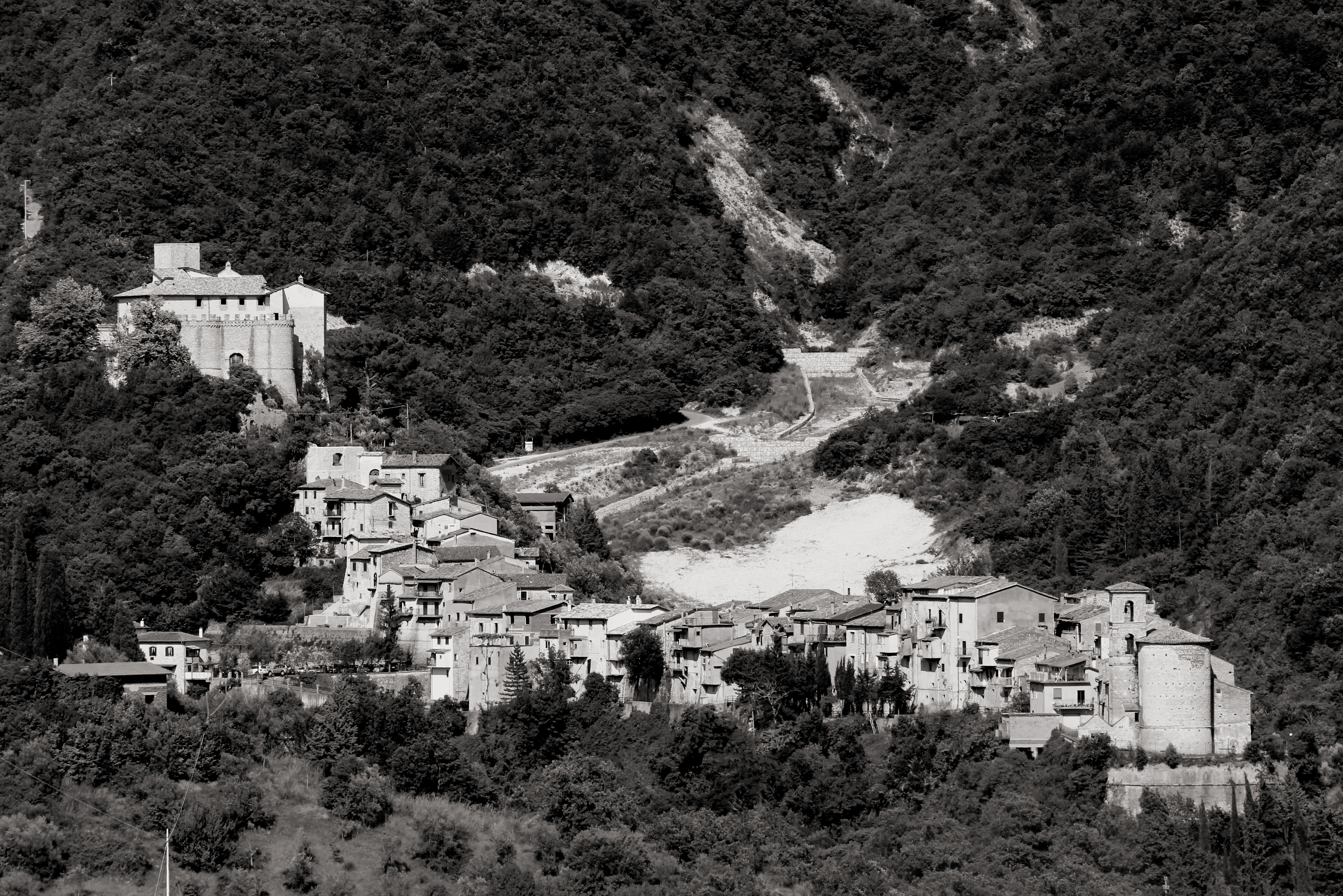
- View of Montenero Sabino

- Coat of arms

- Location within Italy Location within Lazio
- Coordinates: 42°17′N 12°49′E
- Country: Italy
- Region: Lazio
- Province: Rieti (RI)

Government
  - Mayor: Ugo Mancini

Area
  - Total: 22.7 km^{2} (8.8 sq mi)
- Elevation: 450 m (1,480 ft)

Population (2008)
  - Total: 316
  - Density: 13.9/km^{2} (36.1/sq mi)
- Demonym: Montenerini
- Time zone: UTC+1 (CET)
  - Summer (DST): UTC+2 (CEST)
- Postal code: 02040
- Dialing code: 0765

Montenero Sabino is a comune (municipality) in the Province of Rieti in the Italian region of Latium, located about 50 kilometres (31 mi) northeast of Rome and about 14 kilometres (9 mi) southwest of Rieti.

Among the landmarks in town are the Castello Orsini and the parish church of San Cataldo.
