= Fulco of Ireland =

Irish soldier

Fulco of Ireland (fl. 8th/9th century) was an Irish soldier.

== Biography ==
Fulco was an Irish soldier who came to France with four thousand Irishmen to serve Emperor Charlemagne. He married a woman named Da Spettini and they produced a family called Scotti (Latin for Irish), a surname still found in that part of Italy. He is revered in Pavia as Saint Fulco.

== See also ==
- Andrew the Scot
- Catald
- Deicolus
- Niall Ó Glacáin
- Sholto Douglas
