= Catald =

Irish monk

Saint Catald
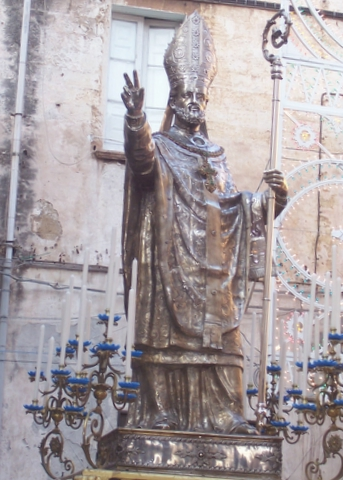
- Statue of Saint Catald at Taranto
- Born: 7th century Ireland
- Died: 685; Taranto
- Venerated in: Catholic Church
- Canonized: About 685 (Pre-congregation)
- Major shrine: Lismore, County Waterford, Taranto
- Feast: 10 May
- Patronage: Invoked for protection from plagues, droughts and storms

Catald of Taranto (also Cataldus, Cathaluds, Cathaldus, Cat(t)aldo, Cathal; fl. 7th century) was an Irish monk.

== Biography ==
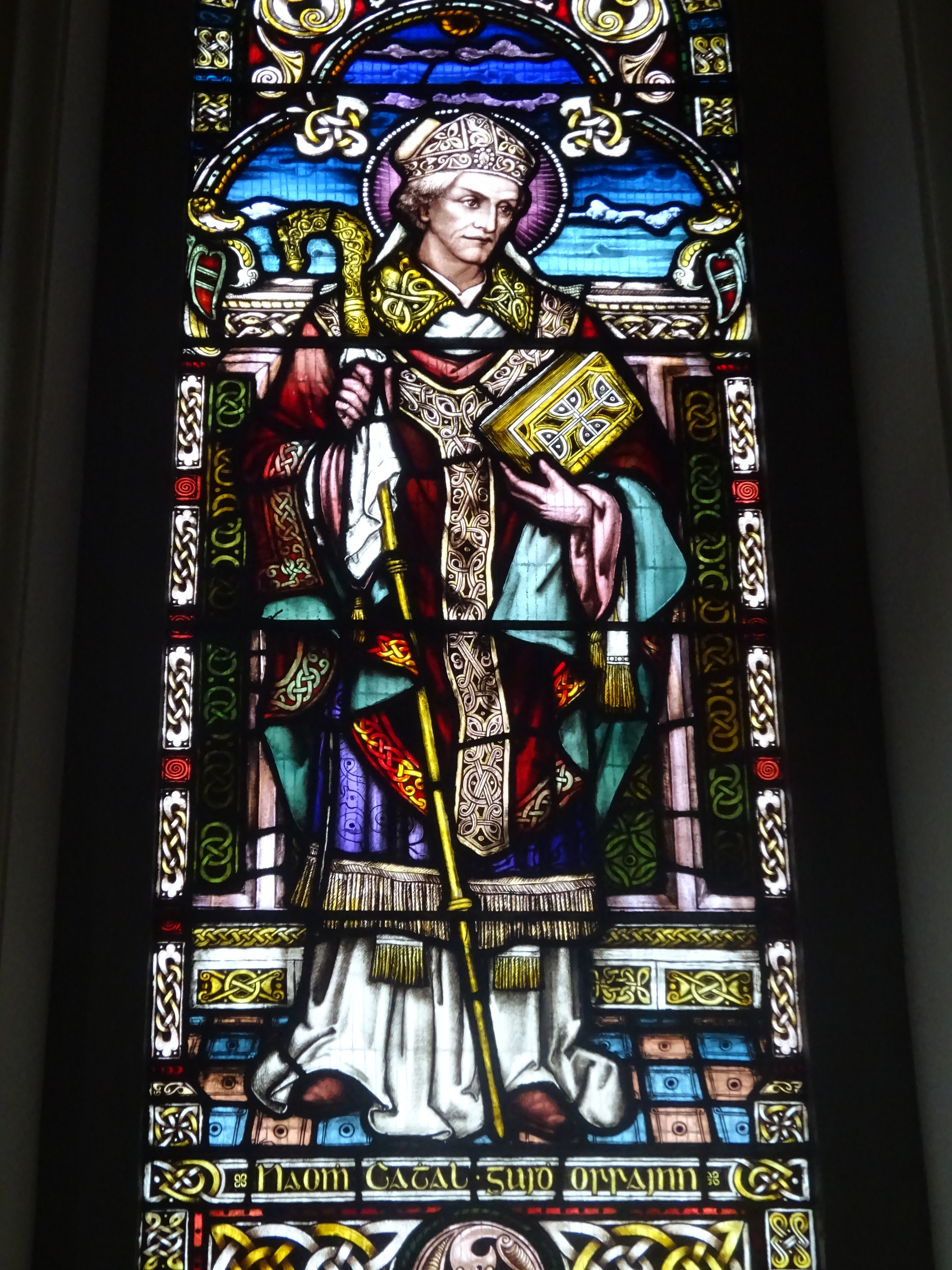
Stained glass of Cathal, Ireland

Cataldus was born in Munster and became the disciple and successor of Carthage in the famous School of Lismore, County Waterford. He is believed to have been consecrated a bishop in Ireland. His apparent desire for a life of solitude saw him venture off to Jerusalem on a pilgrimage.

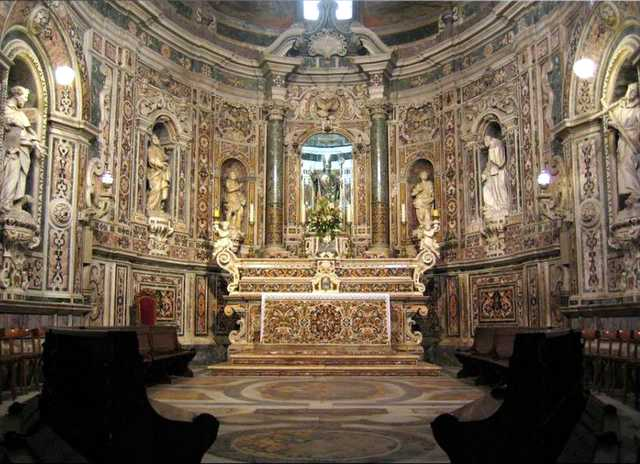
San Cataldo, Taranto

On his return home his ship was wrecked off the Italian coast, near the city of Taranto. The people here appear to have encouraged the monk to accept the government of their church. Some of the miracles claimed through Catald's intercession include protecting the city against the plague and floods that, apparently, had occurred in neighbouring areas.

When his coffin was opened in the eleventh century, it contained a gold cross left at the time of his burial. The relics of the saint were then encased and preserved in the high altar of the cathedral.

== Legacy ==
His feast day is 10 May.

Saint Cathal was the patron of the Sicilian Normans.

San Cataldo is the patron saint of Corato, located in the Metropolitan City of Bari and the region of Apulia.

The Cattedrale di San Cataldo is the archiepiscopal see of the Archdiocese of Taranto. Sicily is home to two churches named Chiesa di San Cataldo: the Church of San Cataldo in Palermo, a UNESCO World Heritage Site, and the Church of San Cataldo in Erice, which functions as a parish church. The parish church in Montenero Sabino, province of Rieti, in the region of the Lazio, is dedicated to San Cataldo.

The Italian towns of San Cataldo (there is such a town in Sicily, and a modern sea resort in the Apulian Province of Lecce) are named in his honour.

== See also ==
- Saint Gall
- Columbanus
- Petrus de Ibernia
- James of Ireland
- List of Catholic saints
