= Nanni di Banco =

Italian sculptor

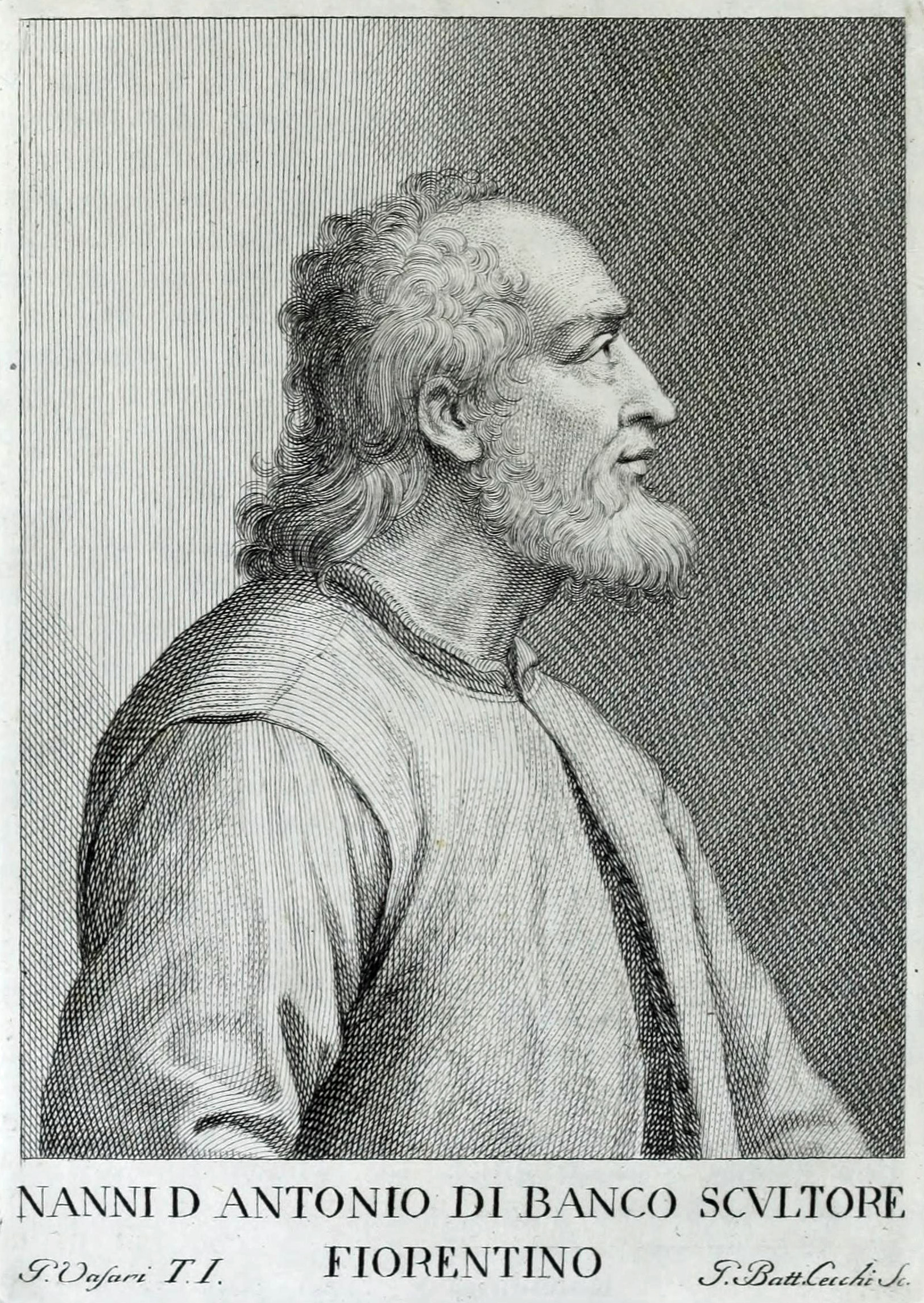
- Born: c. 1374
- Died: 1421
- Known for: Sculptor
- Movement: Italian Renaissance

Giovanni di Antonio di Banco, called Nanni di Banco (c. 1374 – 1421), was an Italian Renaissance sculptor from Florence. He was a contemporary of Donatello – both are first recorded as sculptors in the accounts of the Florence Duomo in 1406, presumably as young masters. He is one of the artists whose work manifested the transition from Gothic to Renaissance art in the city, finding inspiration in classical Roman sculpture and bringing a new naturalism to Florentine art.

== Early life ==
Nanni di Banco, born probably about 1374 in Florence, was the son of Antonio di Banco and Giovanna Succhielli. Antonio married Giovanna in 1368 and joined the stonemasons' guild in 1372. He was employed for many years in the building works (Fabbrica di Santa Maria del Fiore) of Florence Cathedral as a "quarryman, stonemason, master builder, and designer". He ran the family workshop in the Sant'Ambrogio parish while Giovanna owned a farm in the parish of Santa Maria a Settignano. She also came from a long line of stonemasons who had important offices in the Fabbrica di S. Maria del Fiore.

Nanni received the training typical of a Florentine artisan, being descended from stonemasons who were active in the Opera di Santa Maria del Fiore. His grandfather Banco di Falco and his great-uncle Agostino di Falco are listed as masters in Opera del Duomo documents concerning construction of the cathedral and the bell tower. Nanni's father, Antonio, procured materials for the cathedral and worked on its decorative carvings. According to Mary Bergstein, Nanni di Banco probably began working as a stonemason in the last decade of the 14th century in the family workshop and then in the Opera di S. Maria del Fiore under the master builders Lorenzo di Filippo and Giovanni d'Ambrogio, respectively. He joined the stonemasons' and woodworkers' guild (arte dei maestri di pietra e legname) in 1405, and is first noticed in the cathedral documents (1406–1408) during the second phase or "campaign" of the decoration of the Porta della Mandorla (Almond Gate). He sculpted the archivolt of the door in which a Christ in Pity (Cristo in pietà) or Man of Sorrows is carved on the keystone at the top of the frieze and framed by a pentagon (1407–1409).

Although Nanni worked with Donatello, Donatello was not, as Giorgio Vasari thought, Nanni's instructor. Most of his training likely took place within the circle of Florentine masons, stonecutters, and sculptors at work on the Cathedral, and in particular in the context of the work known to have started in 1391 on the decoration of the north door, later called the Porta della Mandorla. Giovanni d'Ambrogio, whose work, according to Kreytenberg, "provided a decisive impetus for the emergence of Renaissance sculpture", has been described by Manfred Wundram as the "true mentor of Donatello, and even more so of Nanni di Banco".

== Career ==
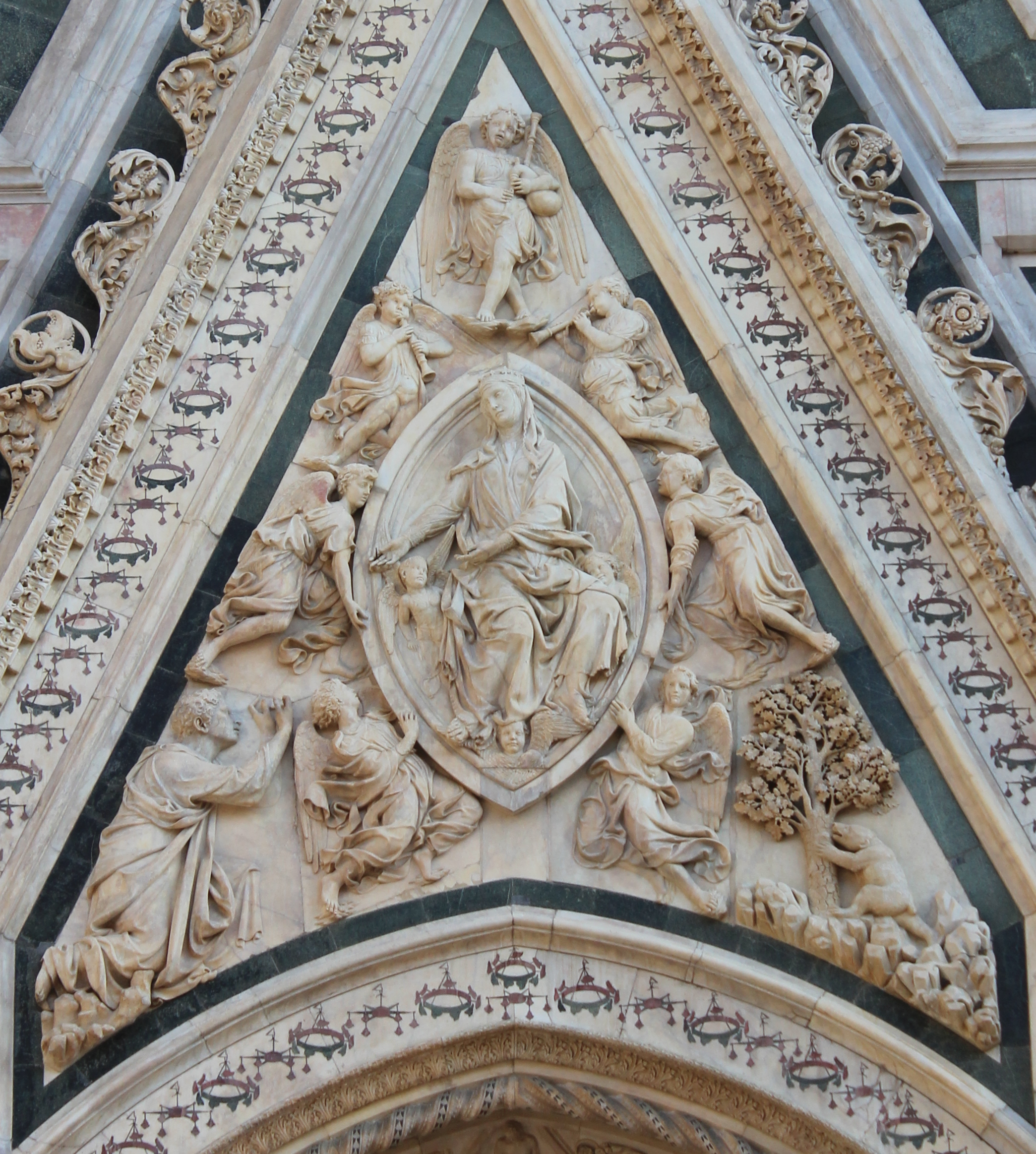
Main relief of the Assumption, Porta di Mandorla, Florence Cathedral, Nanni di Banco

Nanni di Banco's father Antonio attained the position of chief foreman (capomaestro) of the cathedral building works, and served as consul of the Arte dei Maestri di Pietra e Legname (Stonemasons' and Woodworkers' Guild) seven times. Nanni followed his father into the guild in 1405, membership of which gave him status as a qualified sculptor and allowed him to work as such at the cathedral. He would serve as a guild consul five times over the course of his career. Nanni and his father were commissioned to carve the statue of the prophet Isaiah for the cathedral in January 1408.

Antonio was not only a salaried employee of the cathedral workshop but was also a subcontractor who supplied building materials to the Opera del Duomo. His name appeared on the cathedral payroll in 1395 along with those of Niccolò Lamberti, Lorenzo di Filippo, and Giovanni d'Ambrogio, accomplished masters active in the first campaign of work on the Porta della Mandorla. About this time Nanni likely carved the small Hercules on a lower panel of the portal, while Antonio produced the frieze of the archivolt, for which Nanni later sculpted the keystone with the Man of Sorrows in 1407–1409.

After the completion of the cathedral's northwest tribune in 1407–1408, several stonemasons, including Antonio di Banco, were commissioned by the Operai to adorn the spurs of the buttresses with twelve life-sized statues of Old Testament prophets. On 24 January 1408, Antonio and his son Nanni received the commission to carve the first, a marble Isaiah which was to set the standard for the other figures. Nanni did all the actual carving. A month later, Donatello was commissioned to sculpt a companion piece, a statue of equal size depicting David as prophet. At the time, Donatello was twenty-two and had been active in the workshop of Lorenzo Ghiberti. Both of the statues were to be placed on the dome tribune on the north side of the Duomo. A resolution issued on 20 February 1408 stipulated that the David should be carved in the same manner, under the same conditions, and at the same rate of pay as the statue carved by Nanni. Nonetheless, Donatello was subsequently paid more for his work than Nanni was for his Isaiah. According to Janson, this was because Donatello's statue included the additional feature of Goliath's head.

Over the course of a year and a half, Nanni had sculpted the Isaiah, the first known full-length statue of the biblical prophet, and Donatello had carved his marble David. Both statues depict a biblical prophet as a youth, and share a Gothic sway in pose with a corresponding arrangement of drapery on the body. It is not known why the Isaiah was situated and then removed. Donatello's marble David remained at the Opera del Duomo until July 1416, when it was given to the Priors of the Arts (Priori delle arti) and moved to the Palazzo della Signoria. The work, identified by Jenö Lányi as the David, was transferred to the Bargello in the 1870s. The whereabouts of Nanni's Isaiah remained unknown until Lányi showed in 1936 that it must have been the statue in the nave of the church on the right side of the entrance, moved there after the facade was demolished in 1587. Antonio was appointed capomaestro of the Cathedral workshop in 1413, and the next year Nanni received the commission for the Assumption of the Virgin on the gable of the Porta della Mandorla. According to Margaret Haines, this was hardly a coincidence.

Nanni was elected podestà of the Florentine parish of Castelfranco di Sopra in the river Arno valley for six months starting in July 1416. After his term was up, he became consul of the Stonemasons' and Woodworkers' Guild beginning in January 1417, and one year later he was re-elected. During this period Nanni was completing the Quattro Santi Coronati, working assiduously on the Assumption of the Virgin and beginning to carve the Saint Eligius in Orsanmichele for the blacksmiths' guild.

In May 1419, the Operai del duomo paid Nanni for two reliefs he had carved depicting the arms of the Agnus Dei (wool guild). These were part of a sculptural assembly for the facade of the papal apartment in Santa Maria Novella. That summer he carved four more reliefs for the Agnus Dei by a direct commission to adorn some farmhouses outside the Porta Pisana that had been willed to the guild. The following September he was again elected consul of the stonemasons' guild. Nanni was most actively involved in civic affairs when he was working on a marble statue of Saint Eligius for the tabernacle of the farriers in Orsanmichele.

On 12 September 1419 Nanni's was elected to the Dodici Bonomini, a committee of "Twelve Good Men", which included three representatives elected from each of the four quarters of the city – they were advisors to the Signoria and had substantial authority. On 16 January 1421, Nanni was summoned to join the Council of Two Hundred, a group formed in support of the Albizzi ruling family. He was intended to hold this position for six months, but a month after he was elected on 9 February 1421, he wrote his will and died within a few days.

=== Works ===
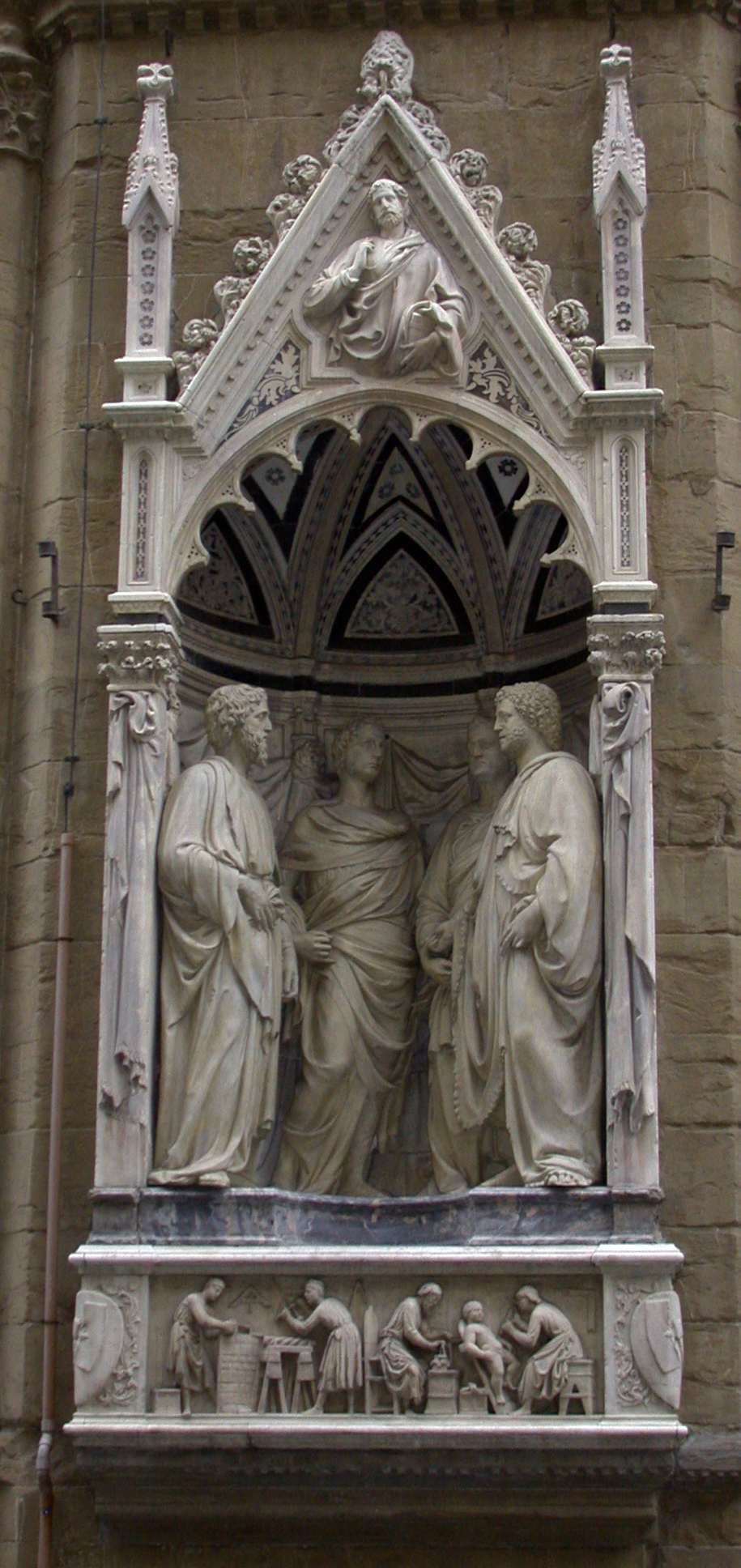
Quattro Santi Coronati, around 1408-15. Orsanmichele, Florence

Nanni di Banco made a name for himself in the transition from International Gothic art to Renaissance art, marking a path for the Early Renaissance in Florence. Many of his works are displayed inside the Cathedral and in the Church and Museum of Orsanmichele in Florence. His first major work was a statue of the prophet Isaiah, as identified by Jenö Lányi, in 1408 for a buttress of the Cathedral.

Antonio was a member of the commission formed on 2 June 1407 to oversee the decoration of the cathedral's north tribune. Consequently, Nanni was active for the Opera del duomo at the time, working alongside his father and executing the Cristo in pietà and the Isaia (Isaiah). To maintain sole authority over their projects, the Operai as a matter of course organized them as joint enterprises among the painters, sculptors, and architects involved, denying any single participant a free hand and encouraging them to collaborate. This approach caused the artists to compete with each other and to seek recognition for the excellence of their work, leading to greater efficiency in completing the programs and thereby keeping costs lower. Nanni carved St. Luke (San Luca), a statue of the Christian evangelist, as part of a commission by the Operai in 1408 for the creation of four seated marble Evangelists to flank the facade of the main entrance to the cathedral, a series which included Donatello's St. John, Bernardo Ciuffagni's St. Matthew and Niccolò di Pietro Lamberti's St. Mark.

Nanni took the opportunity to exploit a new approach of expressing human feeling with themes of humanism in sculpture, the influence of this philosophical movement being expressed in the outline and in the human face through posture and shadowing. The project to create the set of the four evangelists is documented from the purchase of the marble (1405–1407) until the relocation of the statues in the Museo dell'Opera del Duomo after World War II. One of the earliest examples of the development of contrapposto in the Quattrocento is Nanni's Saint Philip, a standing, draped figure, located on the north side of Orsanmichele.

Nanni di Banco was a contemporary of Donatello and Lorenzo Ghiberti. He is well known for his sculpture group Four Crowned Saints (Quattro Santi Coronati, c. 1416) which was commissioned by the stone carvers and wood workers guild for the Church of Orsanmichele. Demonstrating his familiarity with antique prototypes of formal sculpture, Nanni depicted the four saints, sculptors who were martyred in the 4th century, as if they were Roman philosophers or senators. The significance of this work is manifested not only in the striking naturalism and individuality of the figures, but also in the complexity of construction of a sculpture group, for which he copied the swagged cloth seen behind the figures of a Roman sarcophagus from the 3rd century. According to Mary Bergstein, Nanni di Banco's body of sculptural work "in many ways determined the course of Renaissance art in Florence".

The Quattro Coronati was created c. 1409 to 1416–17. Nanni's rendering of the four saints, patron saints of the stone carvers and woodworkers' guild, mostly ignores the confused legend on which it is based, that of the martyrs of Pannonia, who, during the reign of Diocletian chose to die rather than follow his command to carve an image of the god Asclepius. The sculpture depicts the four men, wearing sandals and togas in the ancient Roman style, engaged in serious, agreeable conversation. The relief carved on the plinth on which the figures stand depicts stonemasons, stonecutters, and bricklayers at work, also wearing clothes of the period. This relief was modelled on a Roman funerary stele depicting such craftsmen.

Although Nanni and Donatello were regarded by some of their contemporaries as bitter rivals during the first two decades of the Quattrocento, Bergstein says there is documentary evidence in the cathedral records that indicates friendship and a harmonious working relationship between Nanni, Donatello, and Filippo Brunelleschi. Nanni acted, for example, as Donatello's guarantor to the Opera del Duomo for payments made in advance for work on the Prophets series in the campanile. The trio were paid 45 gold florins in 1419 for preparing a large model of Brunelleschi's cathedral dome, constructed of brick. Nanni and Donatello served on an Opera del Duomo committee four months later to evaluate Brunelleschi's design for the dome.

Vasari includes a biography of Nanni di Banco in his Lives of the Most Excellent Painters, Sculptors, and Architects.

==== Authenticated works ====
Mary Bergstein has compiled a list of works by Nanni di Banco she deems to be authentic:

- Hercules and Blessing Angel, ca. 1395, Marble, Santa Maria del Fiore, Florence
- Man of Sorrows, 1407–1409, Marble, Museo dell'Opera del Duomo, Florence,
- Console Atlanti, Niccolò Lamberti and Nanni di Banco, ca. 1407–1408, Pietra forte (sandstone) Santa Maria del Fiore, Florence
- Isaiah, 1408, Marble, Santa Maria del Fiore, Florence
- Saint Luke Evangelist, 1412/1413, Carrara marble, Museo dell'Opera del Duomo, Florence
- Quatro Santi Coronati, 1409–1416/1417, Marble Orsanmichele, Florence
- Saint Philip, ca.1410–1412, Apuan marble, Orsanmichele, Florence
- Arms of the Brunelleschi Family, ca. 1400–1410, Pietra serena (sandstone) Lapidarium of San Marco,
- Prophet with Scroll, ca. 1410, Marble, Orsanmichele, Florence,
- Saint Eligius, ca. 1417–1421, installed ca. 1422, Apuan marble, Orsanmichele, Florence
- Agnus Dei: Stemma of the Wool Guild, 1419, Macigno (sandstone), Santa Maria Novella, Florence,
- Assumption of the Virgin, 1414–1422, Marble, Santa Maria del Fiore, Florence,
- Four Agnus Dei reliefs, 1419, lost panels from two farmhouses at San Pietro a Monticelli (Florence)
