= Colman nepos Cracavist =

Colman (floruit c. 800), called nepos Cracavist ("grandson of Cracavist"), was a Hiberno-Latin author associated with the Carolingian Renaissance. His poetry is full of classical allusions and quotations of Virgil. He may have been a cleric at Rome, as the manuscript which nicknames him states; there were several such Colmans at Rome in the ninth century. He may be one of those responsible for spreading the cult of Saint Brigid in Italy. One manuscript suggests he was a bishop.

== Connections with Bobbio ==
On the basis of similarity in prosody, he has also been identified as the composer of certain poems traditionally assigned to Columban, the saint and founder of Bobbio Abbey. These are Columbanus Fidolio, Ad Hunaldum, Ad Sethum, Praecepta vivendi, and the celeuma. Since the former was in manuscript by c.790 and the latter was probably used by Paul the Deacon (d.c.800), their poet's dates are set to the late eighth century. It is possible that Colman was merely the imitator of Columban. He would certainly have had access to the latter's works if he lived in Italy.

There survives a notice of some books gifted by a priest named Theodore to Bobbio (Breve de libris Theodori Presbyteri) that lists: Martyrologium Hieronymi, et de arithmetica Macrobii, Dionisii, Anatolii, Victorii, Bedae, Colmani, et epistolae aliorum sapientum liber i. It is unknown whether this Colman is the same as the poet "nepos Cracavist" or if he is a different person entirely. Likewise it is unknown if the books he donated were by Colman nepos Cracavist.

== Poem of Saint Brigid ==
Colman wrote a 34-hexameter lyrical vignette which is the earliest poem about Saint Brigid, incipit Quodam forte die caelo dum turbidus imber ("One day, when a rain-storm happened to be raging in the heavens"). It survives in two manuscripts now at the Bibliothèque nationale de France. The better reading is in BN lat. 18095, where his poem is titled "Versus Colmani episcopi de sancta Brigida" (Verses of bishop Colman of saint Brigid). This manuscript, place of origin unknown, was for some time in Notre-Dame-de-Paris. The other, BN nouv. acq. lat. 1615, a ninth-century manuscript from Saint-Benoît-sur-Loire called the Liber sancti Benedicti Floriacensis, is a compilation of astronomy in which Colman's verses are found under the rubric "Colmanus nepos Cracavist in Roma virtutem hanc sanctae Brigitę praedicavi" in a section titled "De peritia cursus lunae et maris".

In the composition of his vignette, Colman relied on the prose sources Cogitosus and the Vita Brigidae prima, as can be seen from his conflation of their accounts of Brigid's hanging her robe from a sunbeam: Cogitosus says as if from beam, the Vita as if on a rope. Colman uses both similes to describe the miracle. The poem may have been designed for use by a biographer composing a vita of Brigid.

== Envoi to Colman ==
Colman also wrote a short farewell poem to a fellow Irishman, also named Colman, who was returning to Ireland. He himself wrote the title for the piece in two hexameters: Colmano versus in Colmanum perheriles / Scottigena ficti patriae cupidum et remeantem. Colman expresses regret that he will be left behind, but the poem is absent the personal pleading and admonition typical of its genre (and exemplified by fellow Carolingian poets Walahfrid Strabo and Gottschalk of Orbais). Colman speaks of himself as an old man at the time of this writing, though his countryman is young.

This poem is found alongside the Brigid piece in the manuscript known as BN nouv. acq. lat. 1615 and also in Reg. 15 B. xix in the British Museum, London. This last manuscript was written at Reims in the ninth century and was for a long time MS no. CCV at the Abbey of Saint-Remi.
