= Fluting (architecture) =

Architectural practice of cutting grooves through an otherwise plain surface

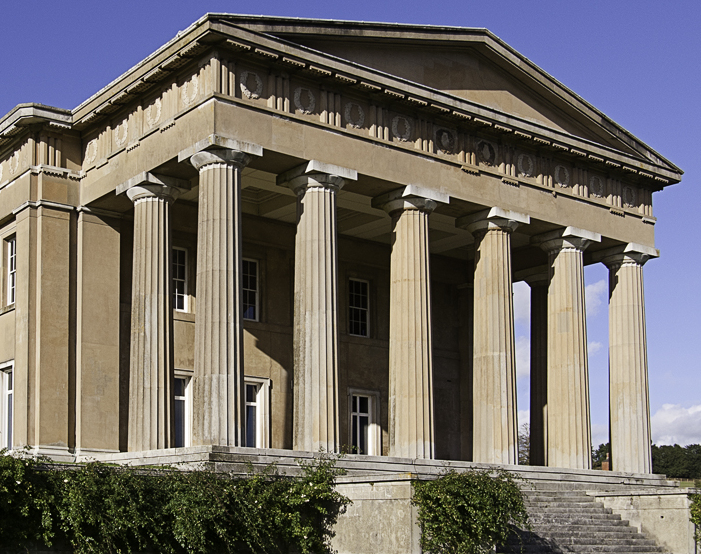
Concave fluting on Doric order columns; Northington Grange, a Greek Revival building of 1804–1817

Fluting in architecture and the decorative arts consists of shallow grooves running along a surface. The term typically refers to the curved grooves (flutes) running vertically on a column shaft or a pilaster, but is not restricted to those two applications. If the scoops taken out of the material meet in a sharp ridge, the ridge is called an arris. If the raised ridge between two flutes appears flat, the ridge is a fillet. Fluted columns are common in the tradition of classical architecture but were not invented by the ancient Greeks, but rather passed down or learned from the Mycenaeans or the Egyptians.

Especially in stone architecture, fluting distinguishes the column shafts and pilasters visually from plain masonry walls behind. Fluting promotes a play of light on a column which helps the column appear more perfectly round than a smooth column. As a strong vertical element it also has the visual effect of minimizing any horizontal joints. Greek architects viewed rhythm as an important design element. As such, fluting was often used on buildings and temples to increase the sense of rhythm. It may also be incorporated in columns to make them look thinner, lighter, and more elegant.

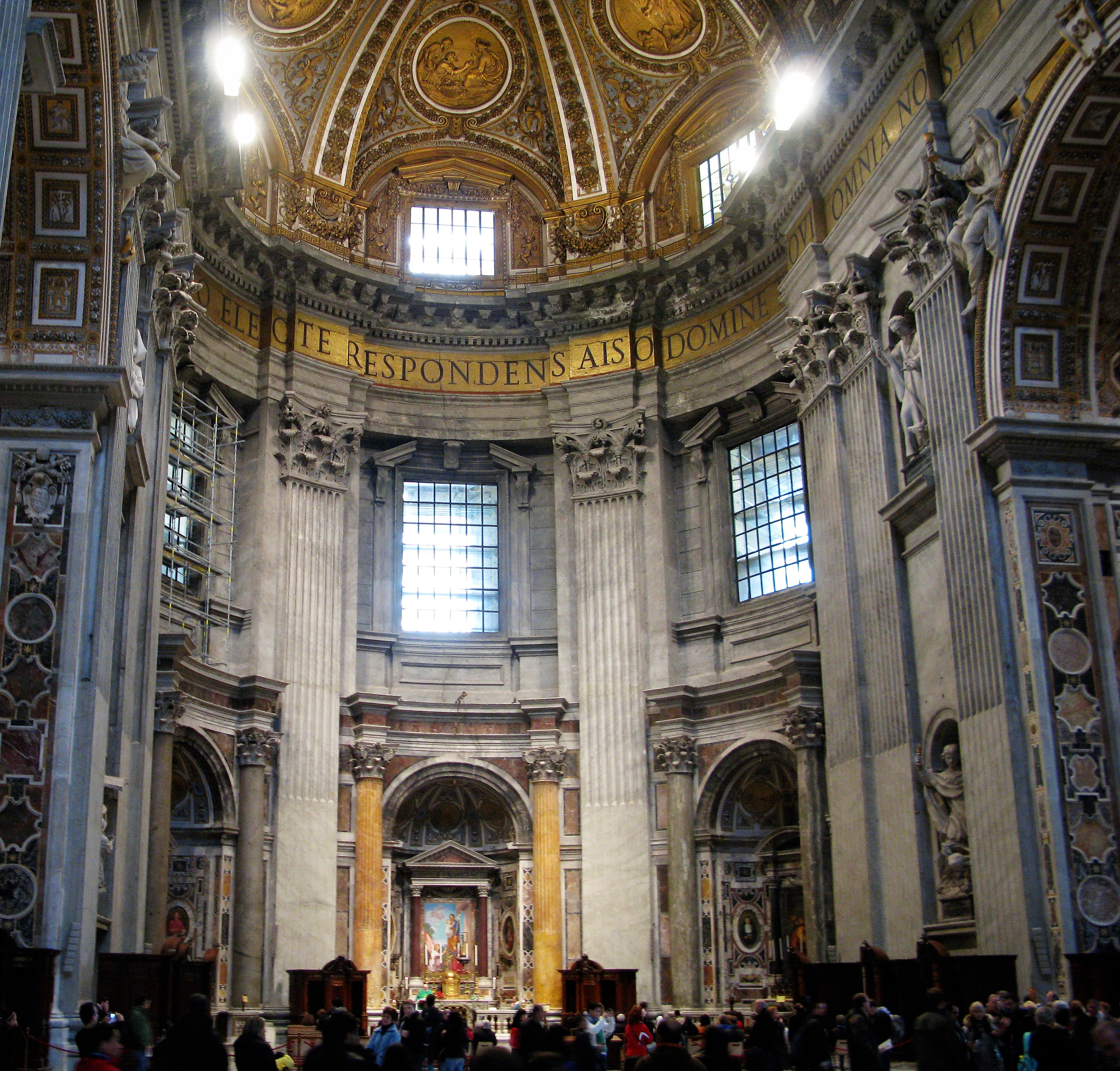
St Peter's Basilica, Rome, with cable-fluted pilasters and fluted columns

It is generally agreed that fluting was used on wooden columns (none of which have survived) before it was used on stone; with a curved adze applying concave fluting to wooden columns made from tree trunks would have been relatively easy. Convex fluting was probably intended to imitate plant forms. Minoan and Mycenaean architecture used both, but Greek and Roman architecture used the concave style almost exclusively.

Fluting was very common in formal ancient Greek architecture, and compulsory in the Greek Doric order. It was optional for the Ionic and Corinthian orders. In Roman architecture it was used a good deal less, and effectively disappeared in European medieval architecture. It was revived in Renaissance architecture, without becoming usual, but in Neoclassical architecture once again became very common in larger buildings. Throughout all this, fluting was used in several of the decorative arts in various media.

== Cabled fluting ==
If the flutes (hollowed-out grooves) are partly re-filled with moulding, this form of decorated fluting is cabled fluting, ribbed fluting, rudenture, stopped fluting or stop-fluting. Cabling refers to this or cable molding. When this occurs in columns, it is on roughly the lower third of the grooves. This decorative element is not used in Doric order columns. Cabled fluting may have been used to prevent wear and damage to the sharp edges of the flutes along the bottom part of the column.

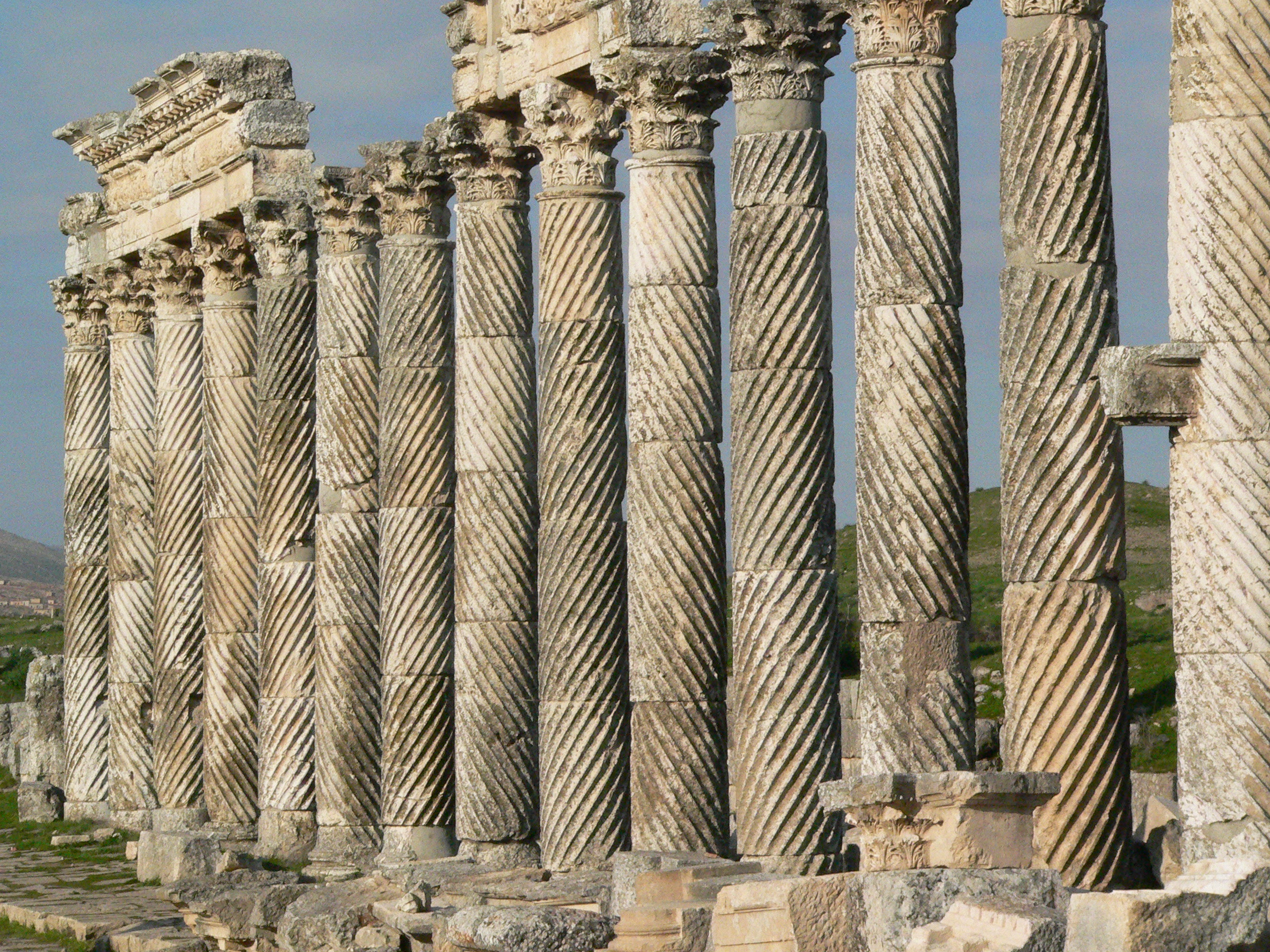
Very untypical spiral fluted columns in the Great Colonnade at Apamea in Syria

== Spiral fluting ==
Spiral fluting is a rather rare style in Roman architecture, and even rarer in the later classical tradition. However, it was in fashion in the Eastern Roman Empire between about 100 and 250 AD.

What is in effect horizontal "fluting" is sometimes applied, in particular to parts of the bases of columns. It tends to be called "banding".

== Applications ==
Fluted columns in the Doric order of classical architecture have 20 flutes. Ionic, Corinthian, and Composite columns traditionally have 24. Fluting is never used on Tuscan order columns. Flat-faced pilasters generally have between five and seven flutes.

Fluting is always applied exclusively to the shaft of the column, and may run either the entire shaft length from the base to the capital, or with the lower third of the column shaft filled. The latter application is used to complement the entasis of the column, which begins one third of the way up from the bottom of the shaft.

Fluting might be applied to freestanding, structural columns, as well as engaged columns and decorative pilasters.

== By period ==
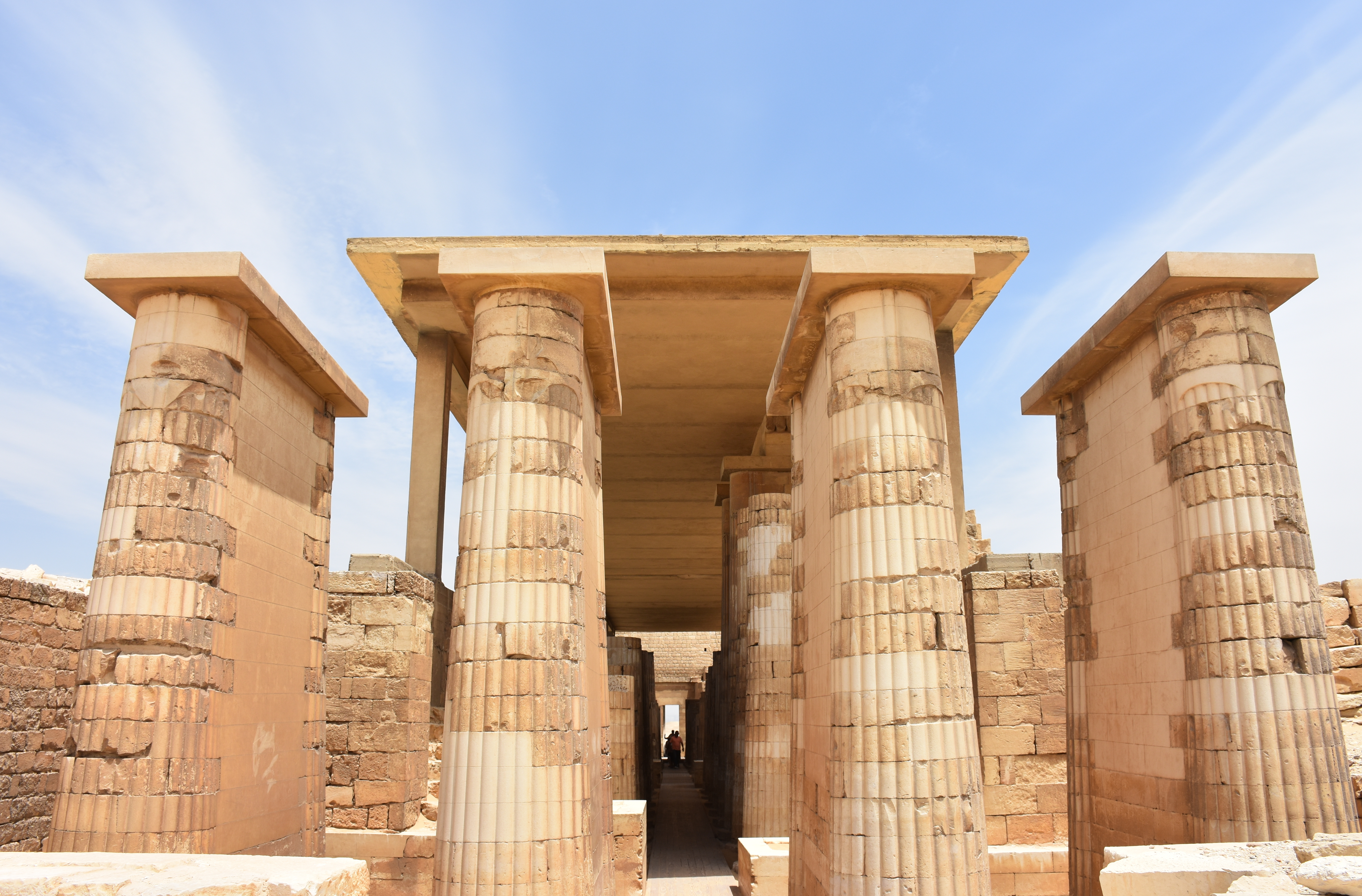
Convex-fluted engaged columns at Djoser's funerary complex in Saqqara, Egypt. Before 2600 BC.

=== Egyptian architecture ===
Ancient Egyptian architecture used fluting in many buildings; most often the flutes are convex rather than concave, so the effect is the inverse of Greek fluting. Fluting is generally with the intention of making the column look like a bundle of plant stems, and the "papyriform column" is one of several types, which did not become standardized into "orders" in the Greek way. Often vertical fluting is interrupted by horizontal bands, suggesting binding holding a group of stems together.

One of the earliest remaining examples of fluting in limestone columns can be seen at Djoser's necropolis in Saqqara, built by Imhotep in the 27th century BC. The Temple of Luxor, mostly about 1400 BC, has different types in different areas. In some types only part of the shaft is fluted; some columns at Luxor have five different zones of vertical fluting or horizontal banding.

Some of the smaller columns at the Temple of Hatshepsut, Deir el-Bahari, Egypt, c.1470 BC bear a considerable resemblance to the Greek Doric column, although the capitals are plain square blocks. The columns taper slightly and have broad flutes that disappear into the floor. It has been suggested that columns of this type influenced the Greeks.

=== Persian architecture ===
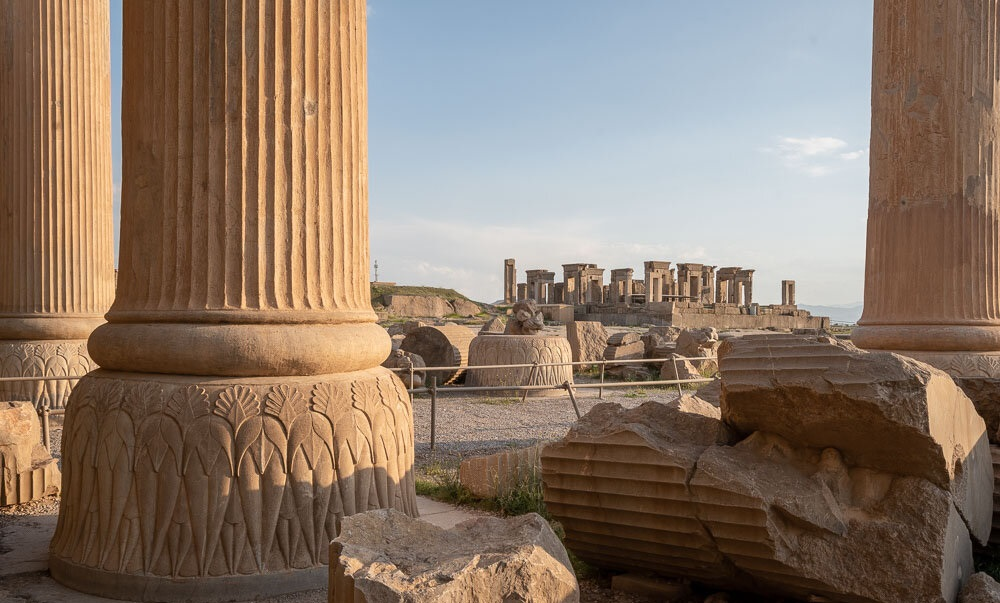
Column bases at Persepolis

Persian columns do not follow the Classical orders, but were developed during the Achaemenid Empire in ancient Persia, over roughly the same period that Doric temples developed in Greece. The ruins of Persepolis, Iran, where examples can be most clearly be seen, are probably mostly from the 6th century BC. In grand settings the columns are usually fluted, with tall capitals featuring two highly decorated animals, and column bases of various types.

The flutes are shallow, with arrises, like the Greek Doric, but they are more numerous, and therefore narrower. The large columns at Persepolis have as many as 40 or 48 flutes, with smaller columns elsewhere 32; the width of a flute is kept fairly constant, so the number of flutes increases with the girth of the column, in contrast to the Greek practice of keeping the number of flutes on a column constant and varying the width of the flute. The early Doric temples seem to have had a similar principle, before 20 flutes became the convention.

Fluting is also found in other parts of the classical Persian column. The bases are often fluted, and the "bell" part of the capital has stylized plant ornament that comes close to fluting. Above this there is usually a tall section with four flat fluted volutes.

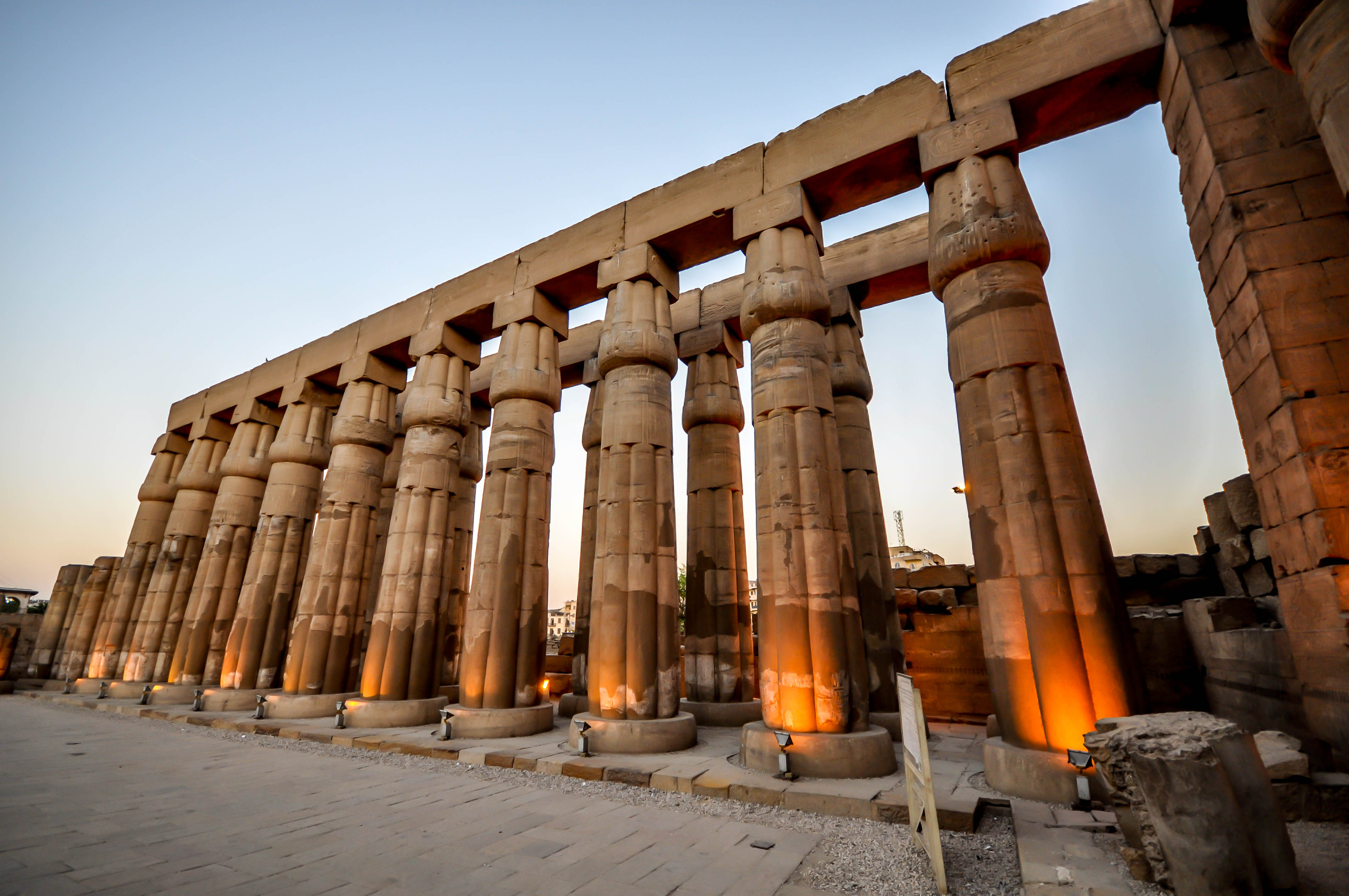
Papyriform columns of the Luxor Temple, Egypt

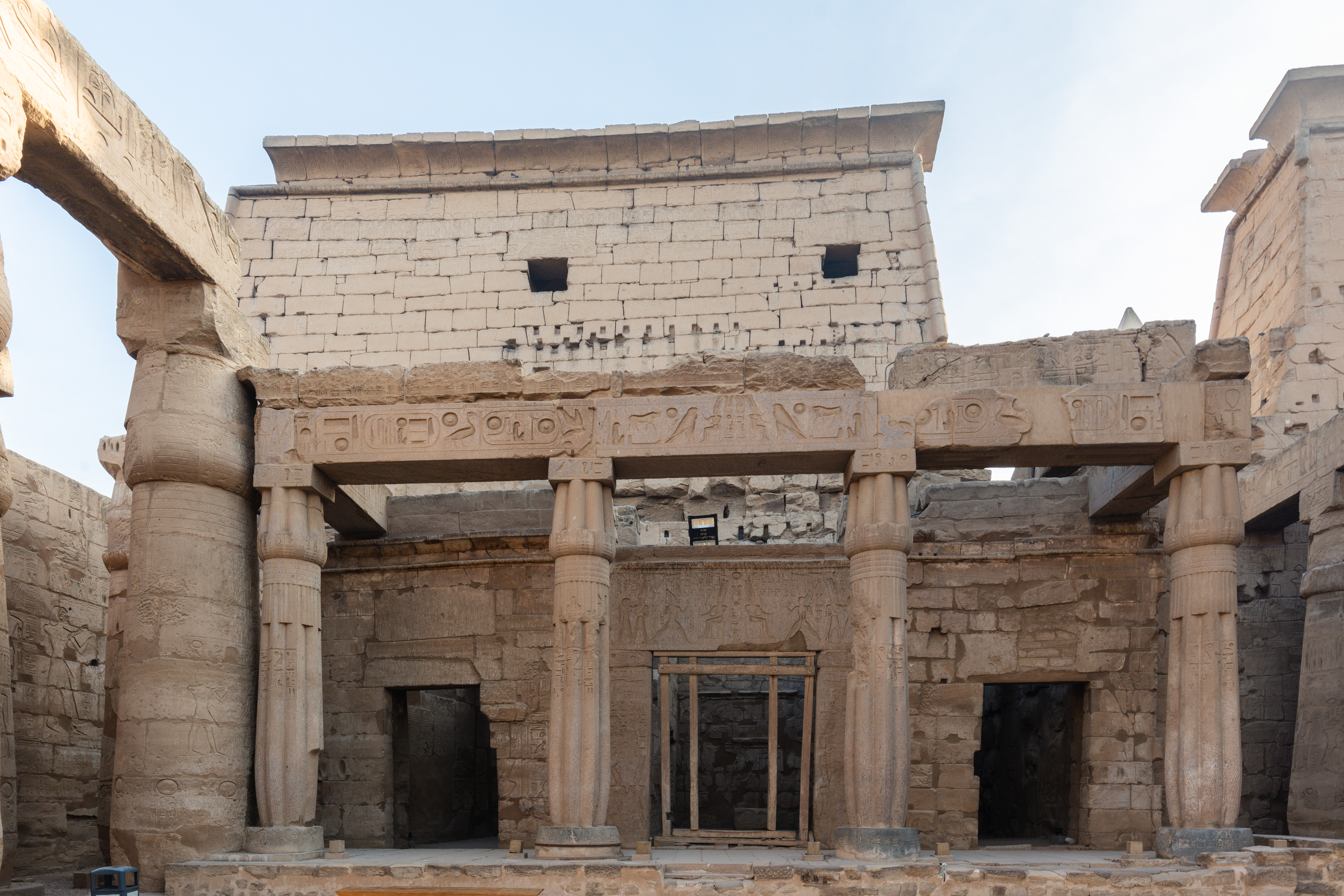
Convex flutes at the Luxor Temple, c. 1400 BC

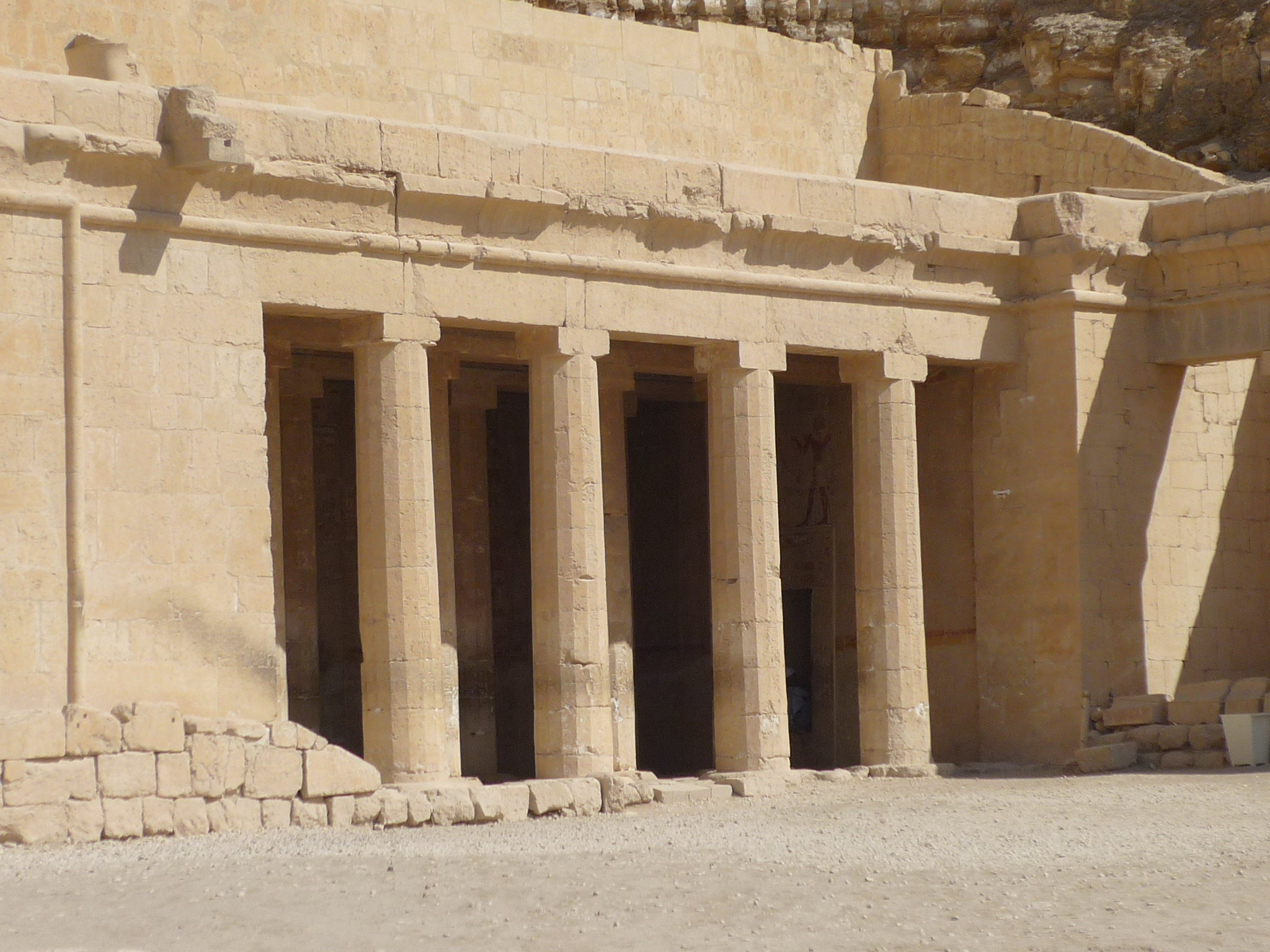
Possible inspiration for the Doric order: Egyptian columns of the shrine of Anubis at the Temple of Hatshepsut, c.1470 BC

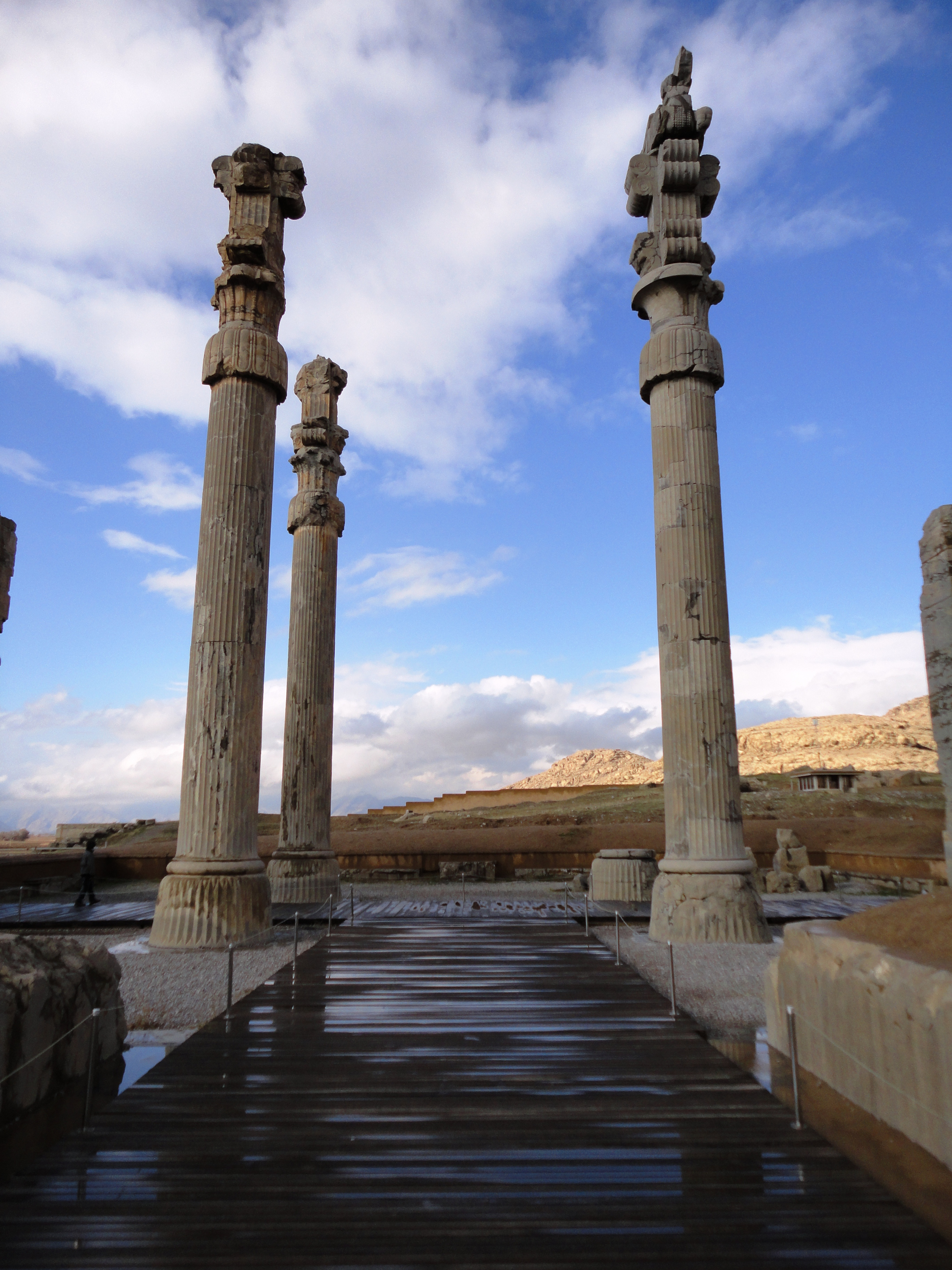
Persian columns at Persepolis, Iran, with fluting in the bases, shafts and capitals.

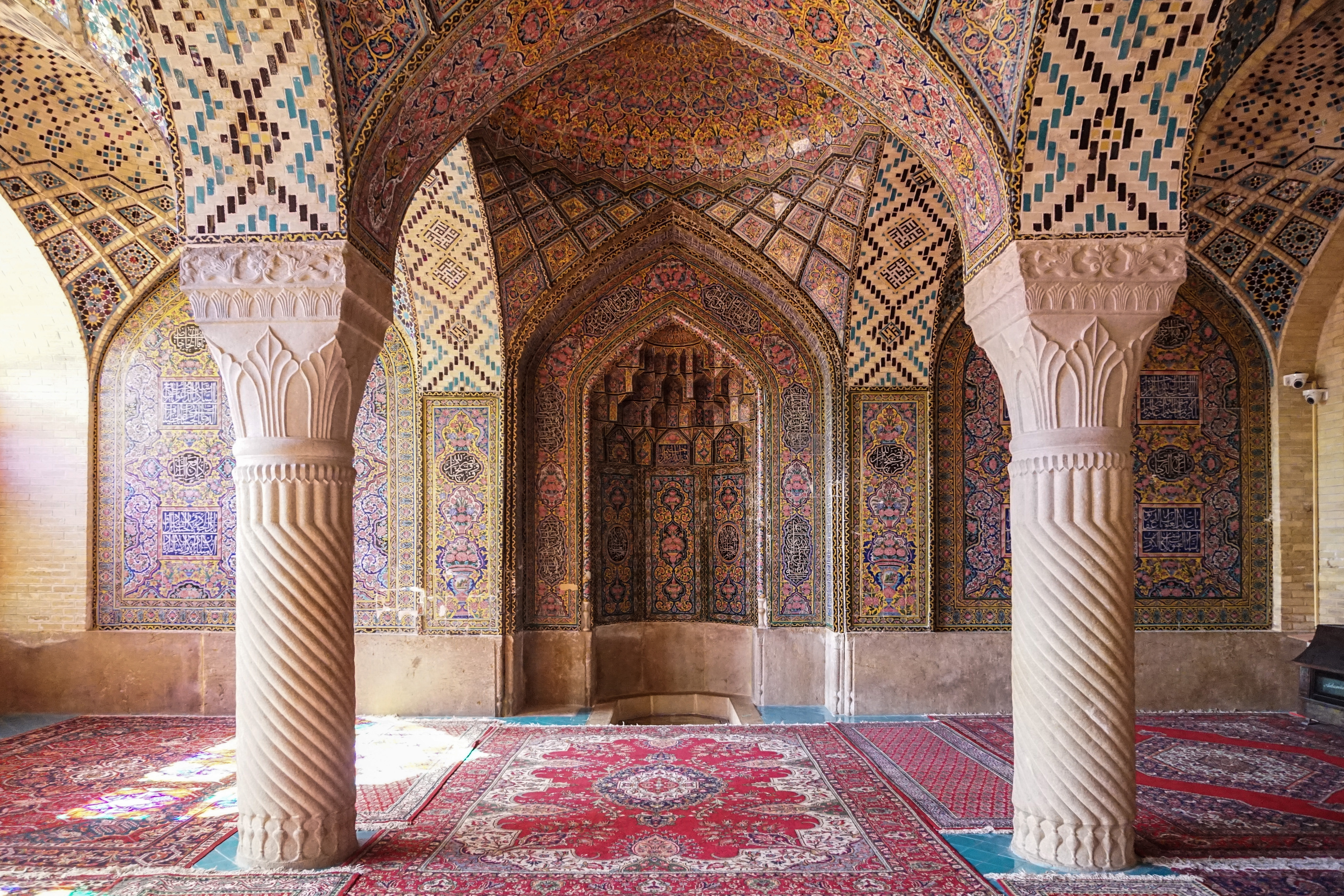
Spiral fluting on columns in the Nasir-ol-molk Mosque in Iran

=== Classical architecture ===
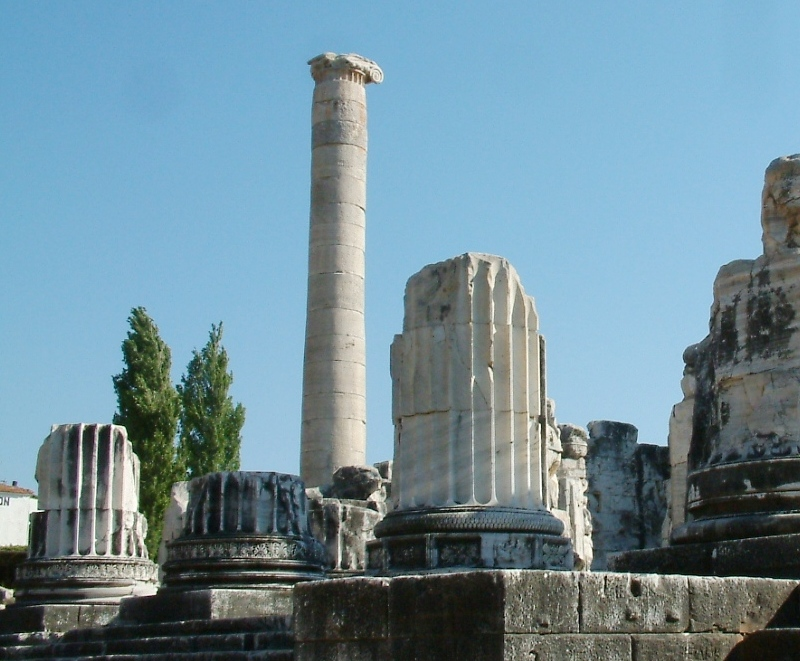
Varied Ionic bases, and at rear a shaft only begun with flutes at the top, Temple of Apollo, Didyma

Fluting was used in both Greek and Roman architecture, especially for temples, but then became rare in Byzantine architecture, where the emphasis was on fine coloured stone, and the architecture of the Middle Ages in the West.

==== Greek architecture ====
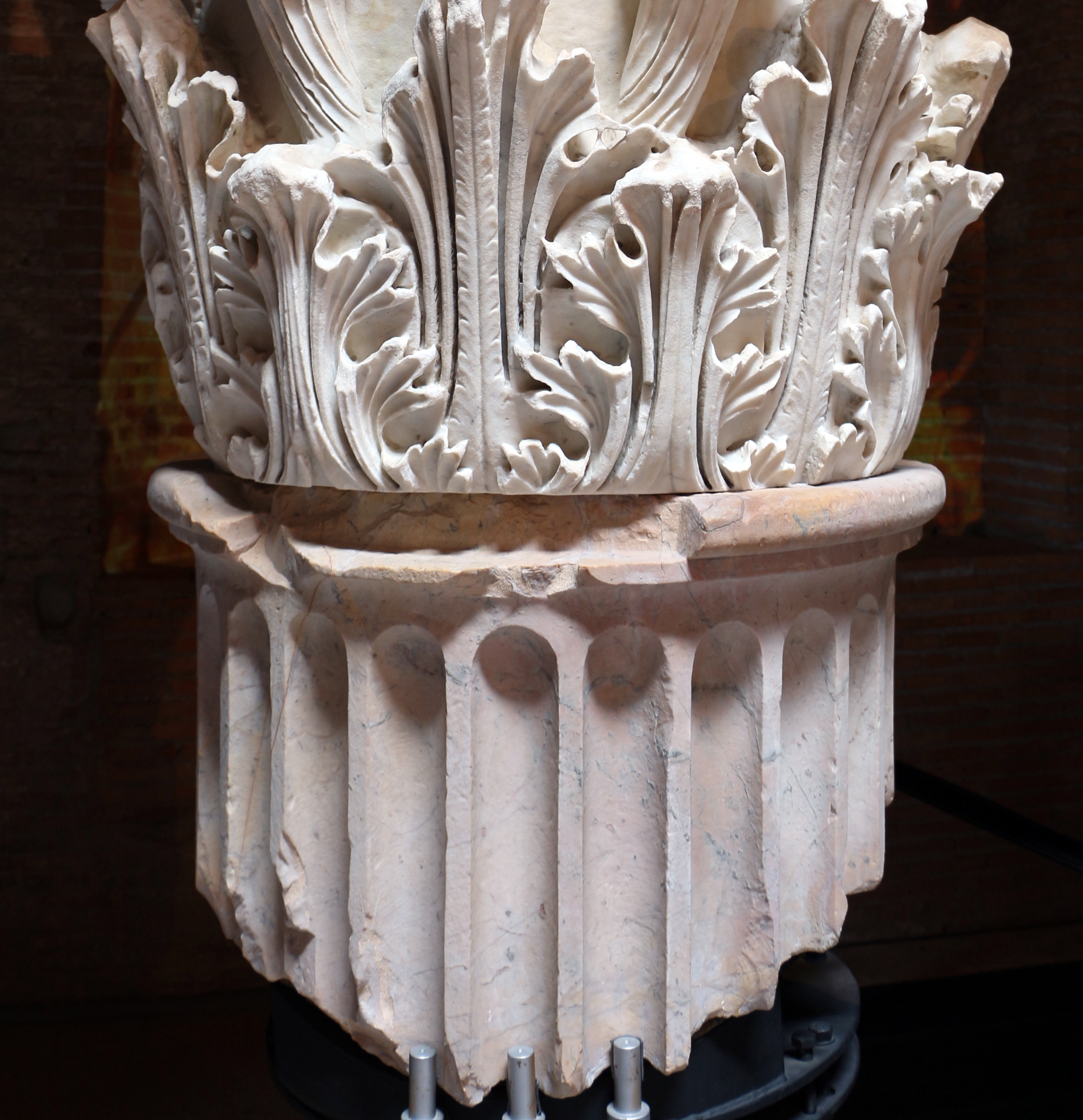
Top of a Corinthian column in Rome, showing the flat fillets

Columns in buildings of the Doric order were almost always fluted; the unfluted columns of the temple of Segesta in Sicily are one of the reasons that archaeologists believe the temple was never completed, probably because of war. They demonstrate that the plain columns, made of several circular "drums", were put into place before the flutes were carved, so ensuring the grooves matched up perfectly.

But the flutes of the top and bottom drums appear to have been started, to give a guide for the rest. A now isolated Ionic column at the Temple of Apollo, Didyma shows this; only part of the top drum has been fluted. Another unfinished Ionic drum section in the agora at Kos has been marked up for fluting, which never took place. In both of these examples there are rather wide margins outside the fluting to the roughly finished surface. There has been considerable modern exploration of the mathematical techniques used to create models of templates for fluting. The practical problems for the masons were increased by the variable girth of the shafts, which both tapered overall and had the entasis swelling in the middle.

Greek masons had also to allow for the various refinements, or subtle departures from the apparent geometry of the design, that Greek architects introduced. These include entasis, swelling in the middle part of the shaft, tapering at the top of the shaft, and a slight slant to the whole column. In the Parthenon the depth of the flutes increases towards the top of the shafts.

In the earliest Doric examples the columns are rather slim, and often only have 16 flutes. By the mid-6th century BC shafts were thicker, and 20 became settled as the number of flutes, thereafter very rarely deviated from when using the Doric order. This fixing of the number seems to have happened while "Temple C" at Selinus was being built, around 550 BC, as there is a mixture of 16 and 20 flutes.

In some buildings, especially secular stoas and the like, the bottom of the shaft might be left smooth up to about the height of a man. Greek Doric columns had no base, and this prevented the flutes, which ended in a sharp arris, being worn down by people brushing past. The flutes continue right down to the base of the column, and at the top usually pass through three very narrow bands cut into the stone before reaching the base of the capital, where the shaft swells slightly. The flutes were carved by making an initial narrow cut to the appropriate depth in the centre of each flute, then shaping the curved sides. By the time of the second Heraion of Samos, perhaps around 550 BC, lathes were being used.

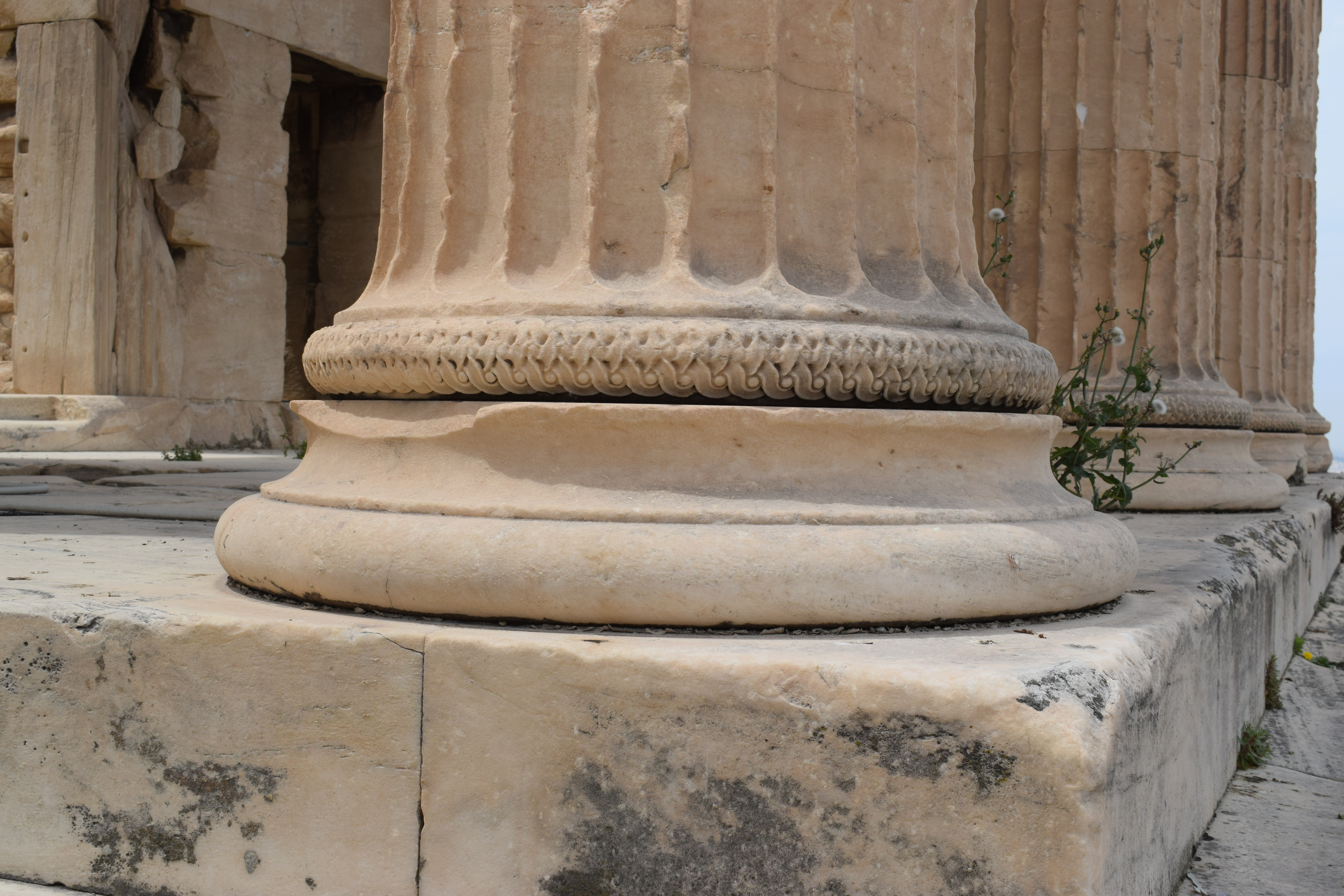
Ionic base, North Porch of the Erechtheum, Athens

Fluting is treated as optional in Ionic and Corinthian buildings, or perhaps was sometimes left for later if money was running short; in some buildings the fluting was probably carved long after the initial "completion".

The fluting used for the Ionic and Corinthian orders was slightly different, normally with fillets between the flutes, that may appear flat, but actually follow the curvature of the column. Despite Ionic columns of a given height being slimmer than Doric ones, they have more flutes, with 24 being settled on as the standard, after early experiments. These took the number as high as 48 in some columns in the second building of the Temple of Artemis at Ephesus in Turkey, one of the earliest "really large Greek temples", of about 550 BC.

Ionic and Corinthian flutes are also deeper, some approaching a semi-circle, and are usually terminated at the top and bottom by a semi-circular scoop, followed by a small distance where the column has its full circular profile, or indeed swells. These orders always have a base to the columns, often an elaborate one.

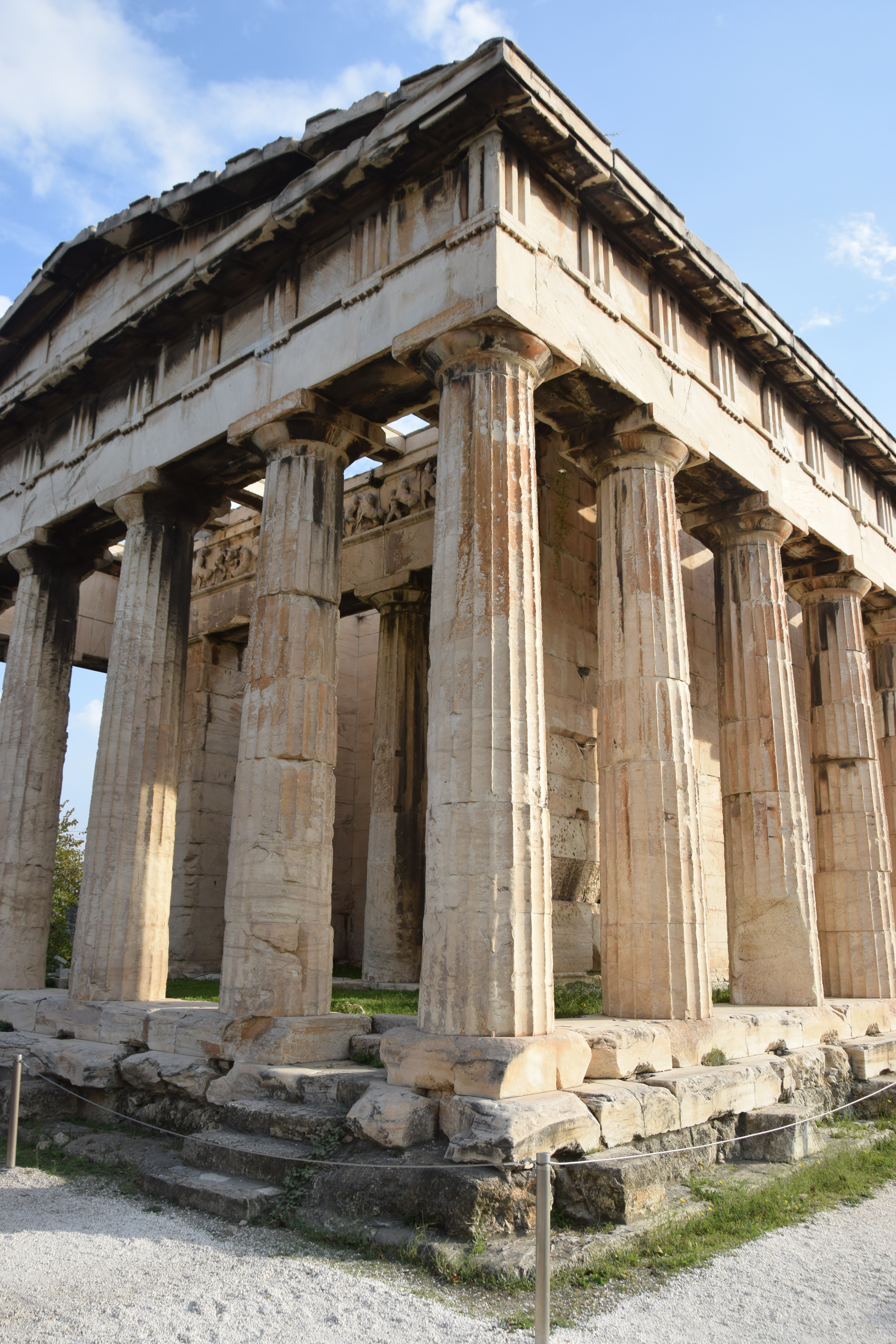
Doric Temple of Hephaestus, Athens

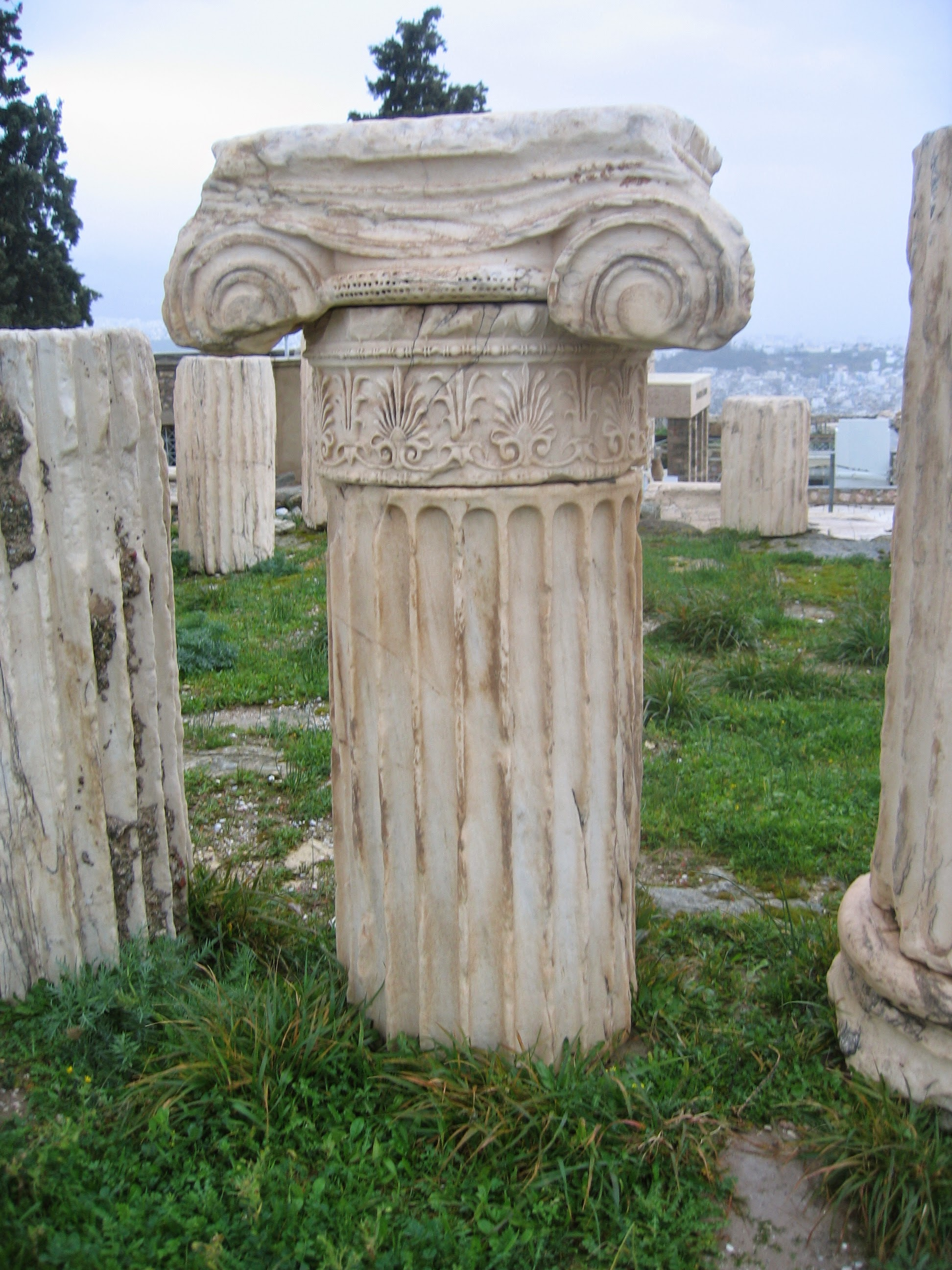
Ionic top and shafts on the Acropolis of Athens

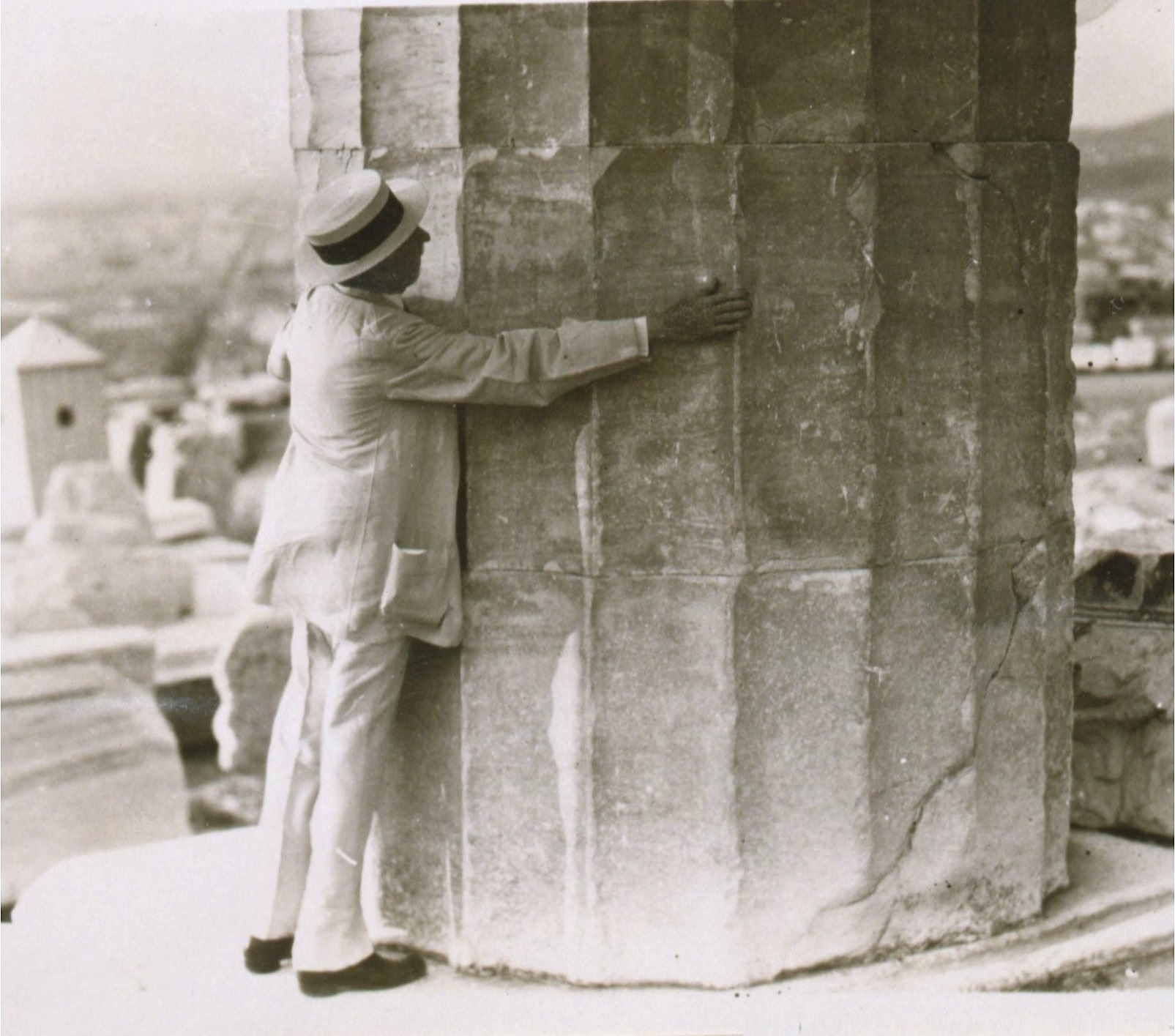
Base of a Doric column, Parthenon, embraced by Frank G. Carpenter

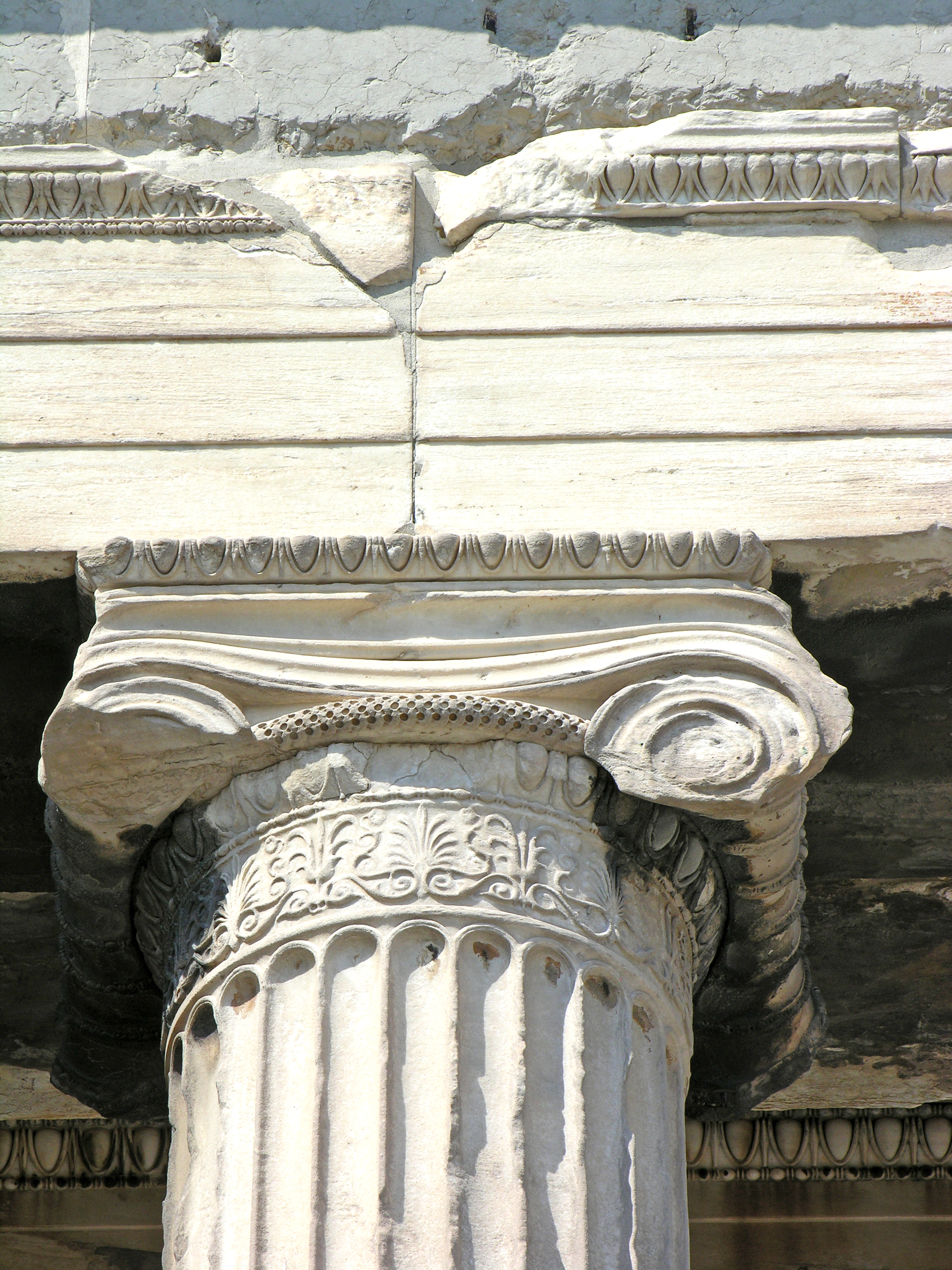
Top of Ionic shaft, North Porch of the Erechtheum, Athens

==== Roman architecture ====
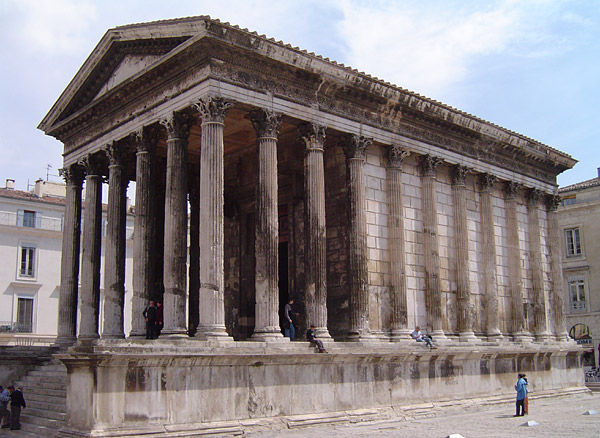
The Roman Maison Carrée, Nîmes, France

While Greek temples employed columns for load-bearing purposes, Roman architects often used columns more as decorative elements. They tend to use fluting less often than the Greeks in the Ionic and Corinthian orders, and to mix fluted and unfluted columns in the same building more often. The external columns on the Colosseum, which use the three classical orders on different levels, are not fluted, nor are the large monolithic granite Corinthian columns of the portico of the Pantheon, Rome, a very grand temple, though many columns in the interior are.

However, it is possible that in some buildings fluting in stucco, "so much used and so rarely preserved" according to J. B. Ward-Perkins, was applied to stone columns. Roman Doric columns "nearly always" have a base, although Vitruvius does not insist on one.

Fluted Corinthian columns perhaps became associated with imperial grandeur. Even rather small provincial caesariums, or temples of the Imperial cult have them on their porches, as do imperial triumphal arches. Examples of temples include the Maison carrée, the Roman Temple of Évora, and Temple of Augustus, Barcelona in provincial centres, as well as the much larger temples in Rome, such as the Temple of Vespasian and Titus. However the Temple of Augustus, Pula has plain Corinthian columns. Triumphal arches with fluting include the Arch of Augustus in Rimini, and the one in Susa, Arch of Trajan in Ancona, and all the imperial arches in Rome. Large temples with unfluted columns include the Temple of Saturn (Ionic, and a late rebuilding), the Temple of Venus and Rome, and others in the Roman Forum.

=== Indian architecture ===
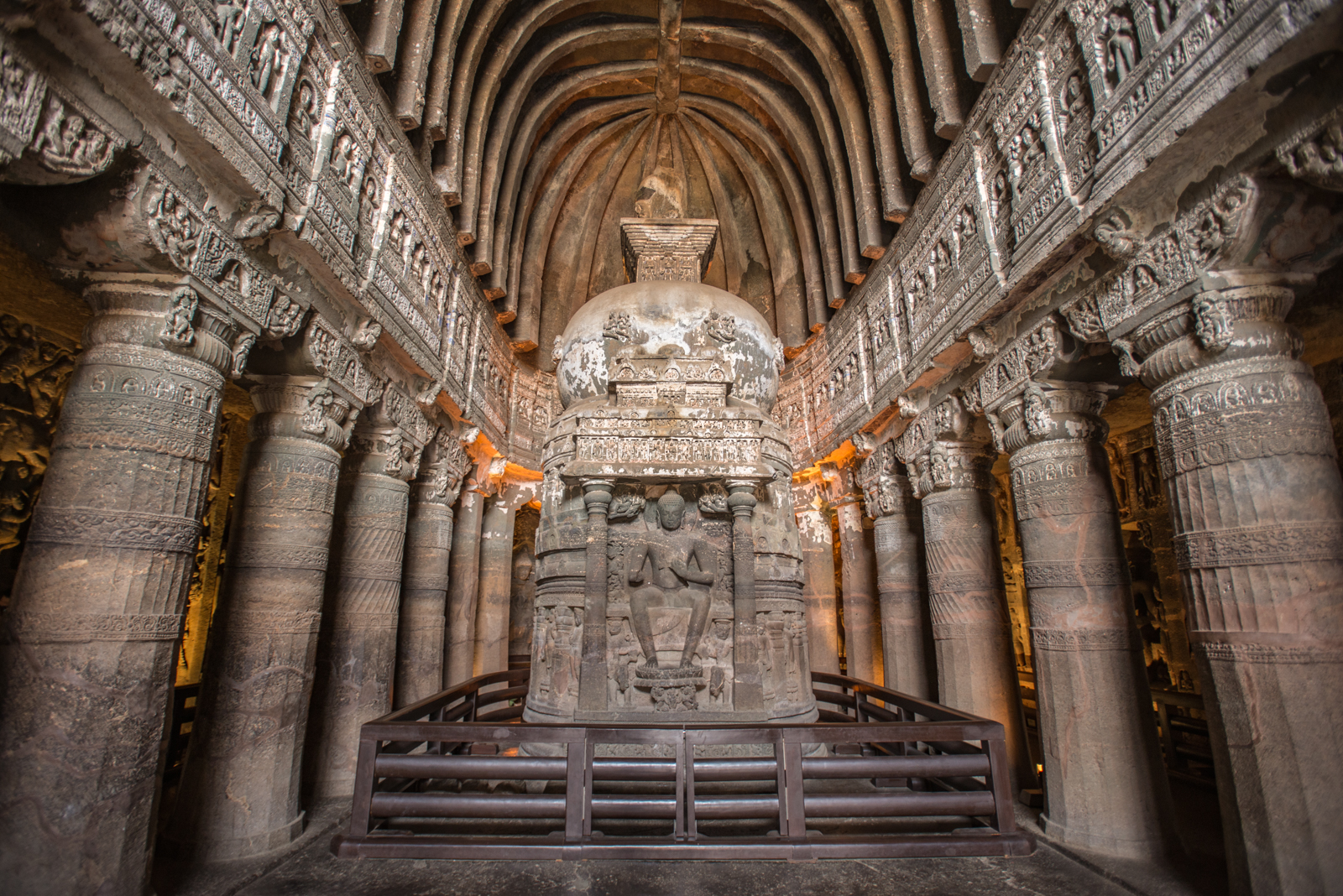
Straight (2 sizes) and spiral fluting in Cave 26, Ajanta Caves, and fluting in the capitals, 5th century

Sections of column shafts with relatively shallow vertical concave fluting were used in India, especially in early rock-cut architecture, as at the Buddhist Ajanta Caves. They were typically mixed with horizontal bands of more complex ornament, such as garlands or floral scrolls. These were useful for covering what might be awkward transitions between different zones. Spiral fluting is sometimes found in the same way, as inside Cave 26 at Ajanta, from the late 5th or early 6th century.

Similar visual effects are more often achieved by giving column shafts several flat faces. The Heliodorus pillar of about 113 BC has three different zones with 8, 16 and 32 flat faces (lowest first), with a round zone above that.

Fluting was also used in capitals, in contrast to the Greco-Roman tradition. The "bell" capitals of the Ashoka columns are fluted, as are the flatter capitals in Cave 26 of the Ajanta Caves. In the Ashoka columns the flutes are stylized leaves, clinging to the bell, with round bottoms.

=== Chinese architecture ===
Fluted columns, some with entasis, were one of the options available to Chinese architects and cave-carvers (survivals are mostly in Buddhist rock-carved shrines) in the 3rd to 6th centuries AD. Some engaged columns were also topped by quasi-capital with volutes, but usually curling up, rather than down as in the Ionic; in some cases these were also at the bottom of the shaft. The possibility of influence, perhaps indirect, from the Greco-Roman world has been discussed by scholars. However, vertical fluting cannot be called a common form of decoration.

=== Byzantine and medieval European architecture ===
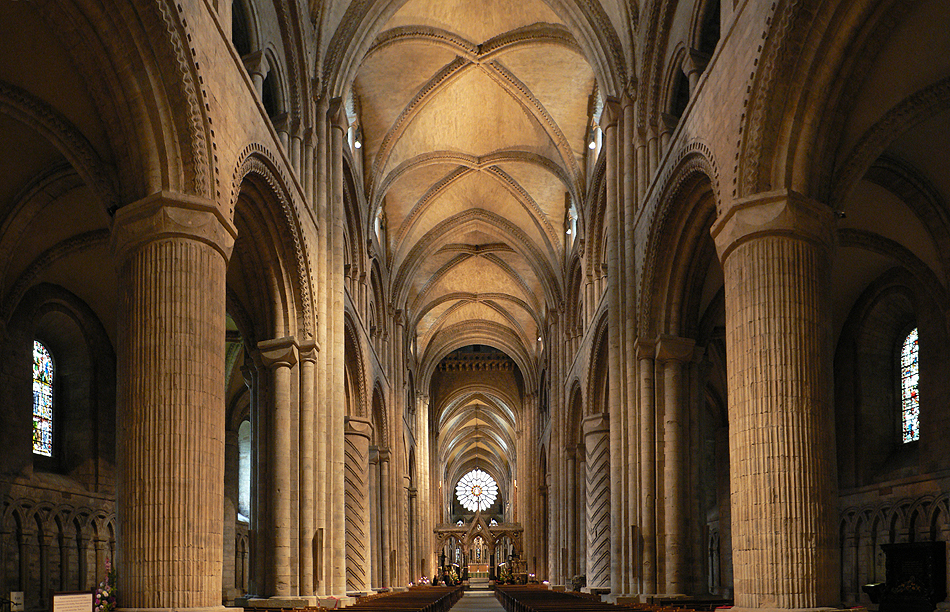
Durham Cathedral, nave. Alternating convex and concave flutes on the two nearest piers.

In Byzantine architecture columns were mostly relatively small and functional rather than decorative. They were used to support galleries, ciboriums over altars and the like. Byzantine taste appreciated rare and expensive types of stone, and like to see these in round and polished form. Even ancient columns re-used as spolia were probably smoothed down if fluted, as they are so rarely seen in Byzantine buildings.

Columns continued to be important in Romanesque and Gothic architecture, often engaged or clustered together in bunches. But the shafts are almost always plain. An exception is two of the large columns ("piers") in the nave of Durham Cathedral (c. 1120s). These have a distinctive format of alternating convex and concave flutes. These were carved on the stones before the pier was erected.

The entrance of the Castel del Monte, Apulia, Italy, an imperial castle from the 1240s, has very thin fluted pilasters under a pediment, in an early and rather shaky attempt to revive classical forms.

=== Renaissance architecture ===
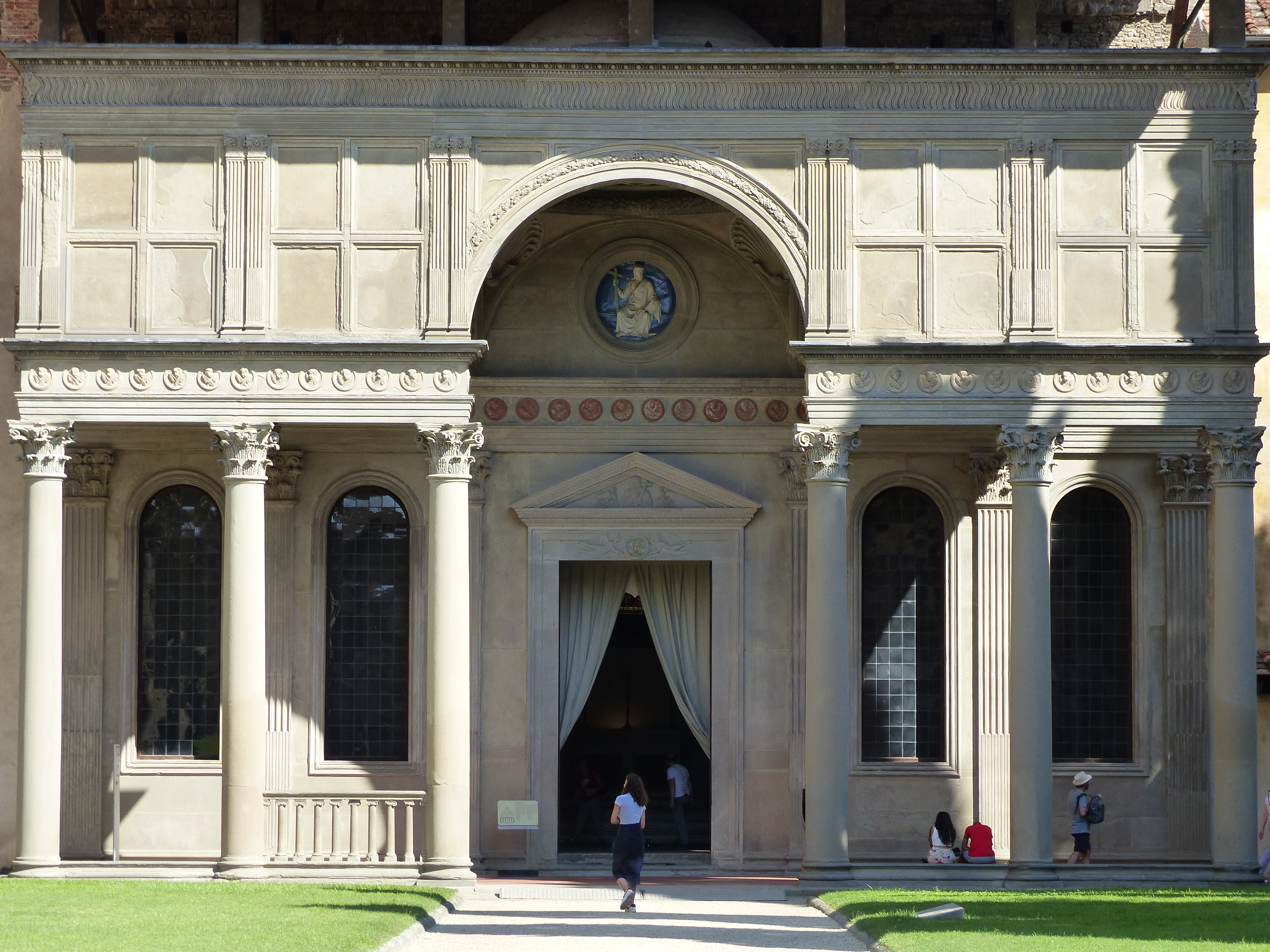
Pazzi Chapel, Filippo Brunelleschi (1429); plain columns but cable-fluted pilasters on the wall behind.

The revival of classical architectural elements, including Classical order columns, was central to Renaissance architecture, built between the 15th and 17th centuries in Europe. But columns were used sparingly in the Early Renaissance, except for courtyard arcades, and fluting is slow to appear.

The Pazzi Chapel in Florence by Filippo Brunelleschi (1429) has plain columns (outside) but cable-fluted pilasters inside and out. A similar mixture is seen in St Peter's Basilica in Rome, where the giant order columns on the facade are plain, but the main pilasters in the interior are cable-fluted, and smaller columns, for example framing the doors, are fluted.

Plain columns and fluted pilasters became a common mixture, not least because at least the internal pilasters are often stucco over brick, making fluting much easier and cheaper than carving in stone.

Although, like other Renaissance manuals, I quattro libri dell'architettura by Andrea Palladio (1570) recommended and illustrated the conventional Vitruvian styles of fluting, in his own buildings Palladio very rarely used fluting; in the Doric and Corinthian orders, his shafts are "almost never fluted", and in the Ionic he "never used fluted shafts".

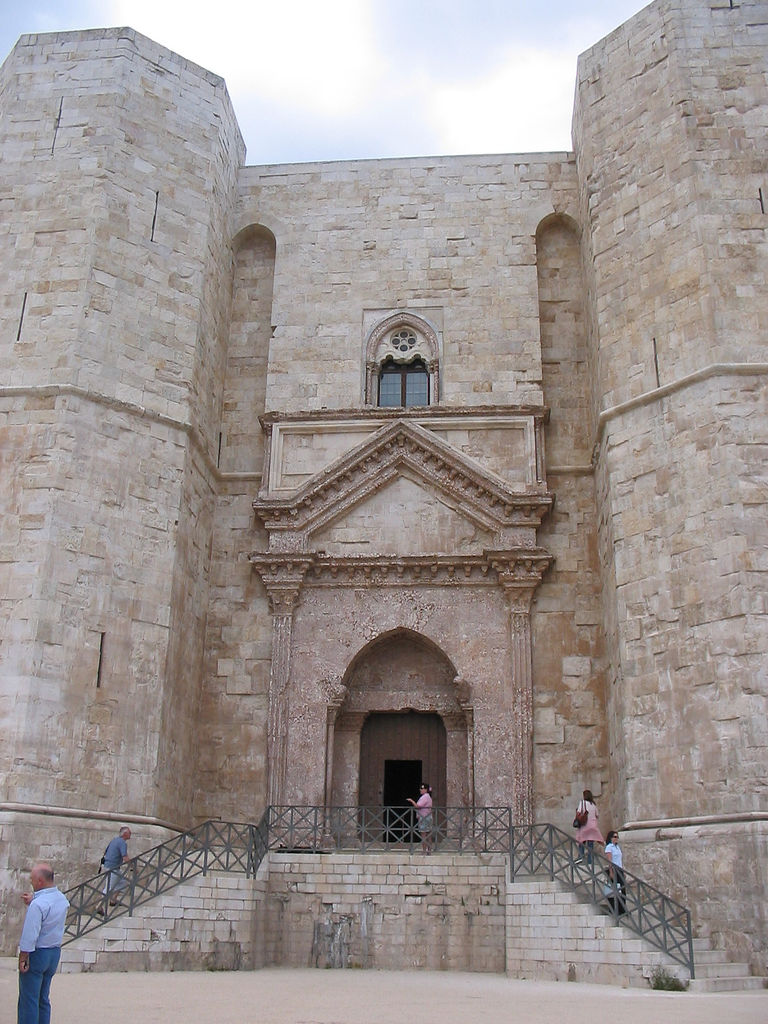
Entrance of the Castel del Monte, Apulia, Italy, 1240s, an early attempt to revive classical forms

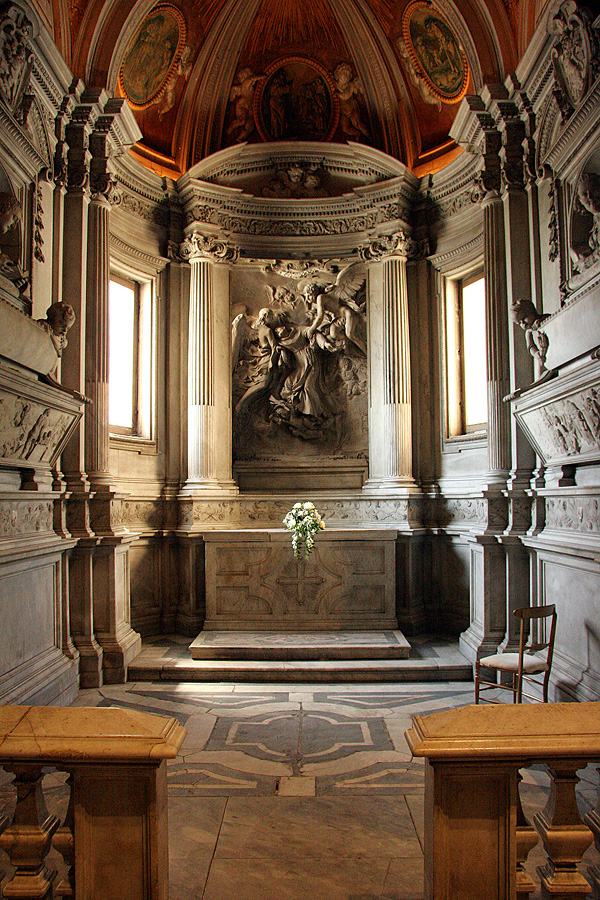
Bernini, altarpiece of the Raimondi Chapel at San Pietro, Montorio, Rome

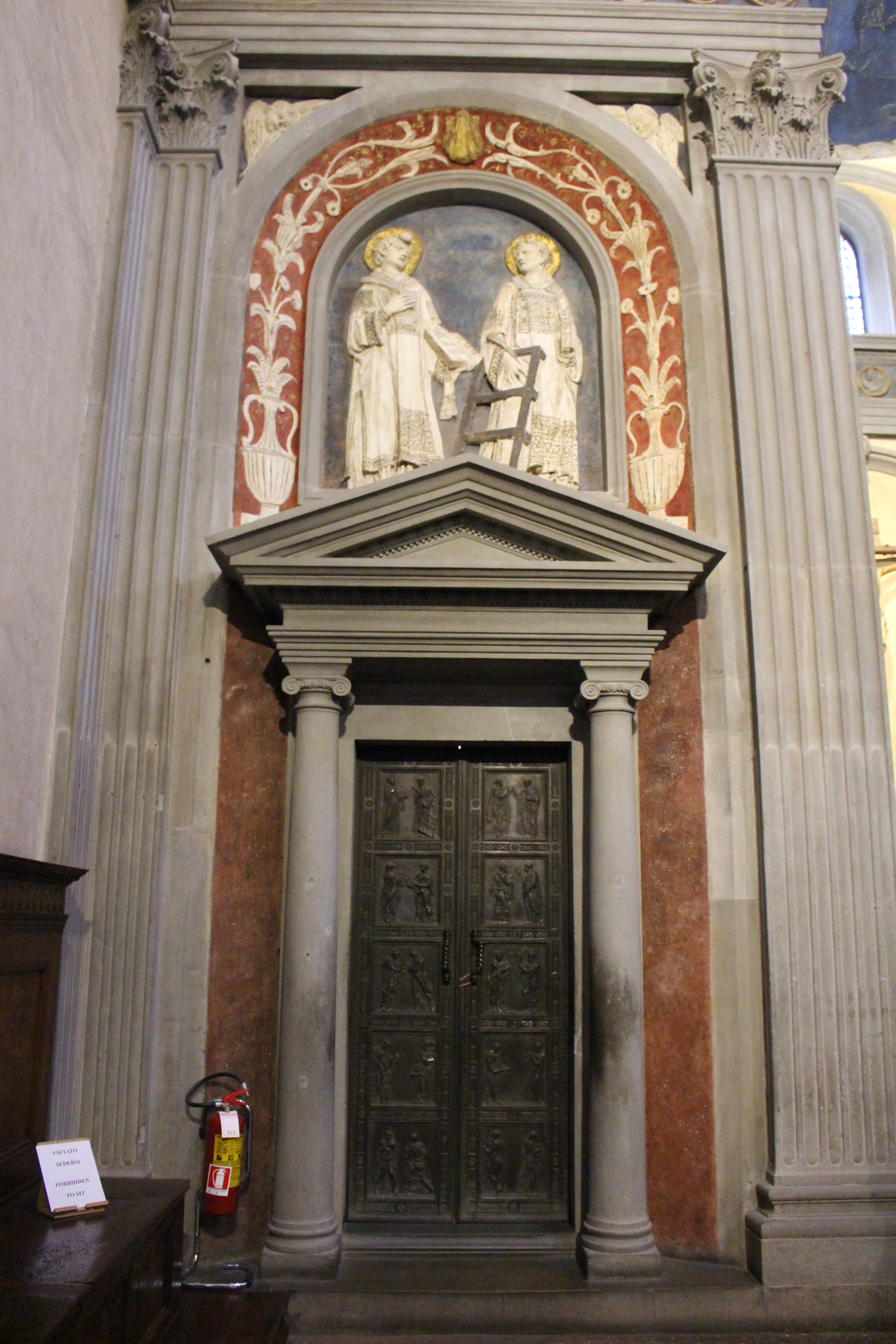
Fluted pilasters inside the Sagrestia Veccia, Basilica of San Lorenzo, Florence

=== Neoclassical architecture ===
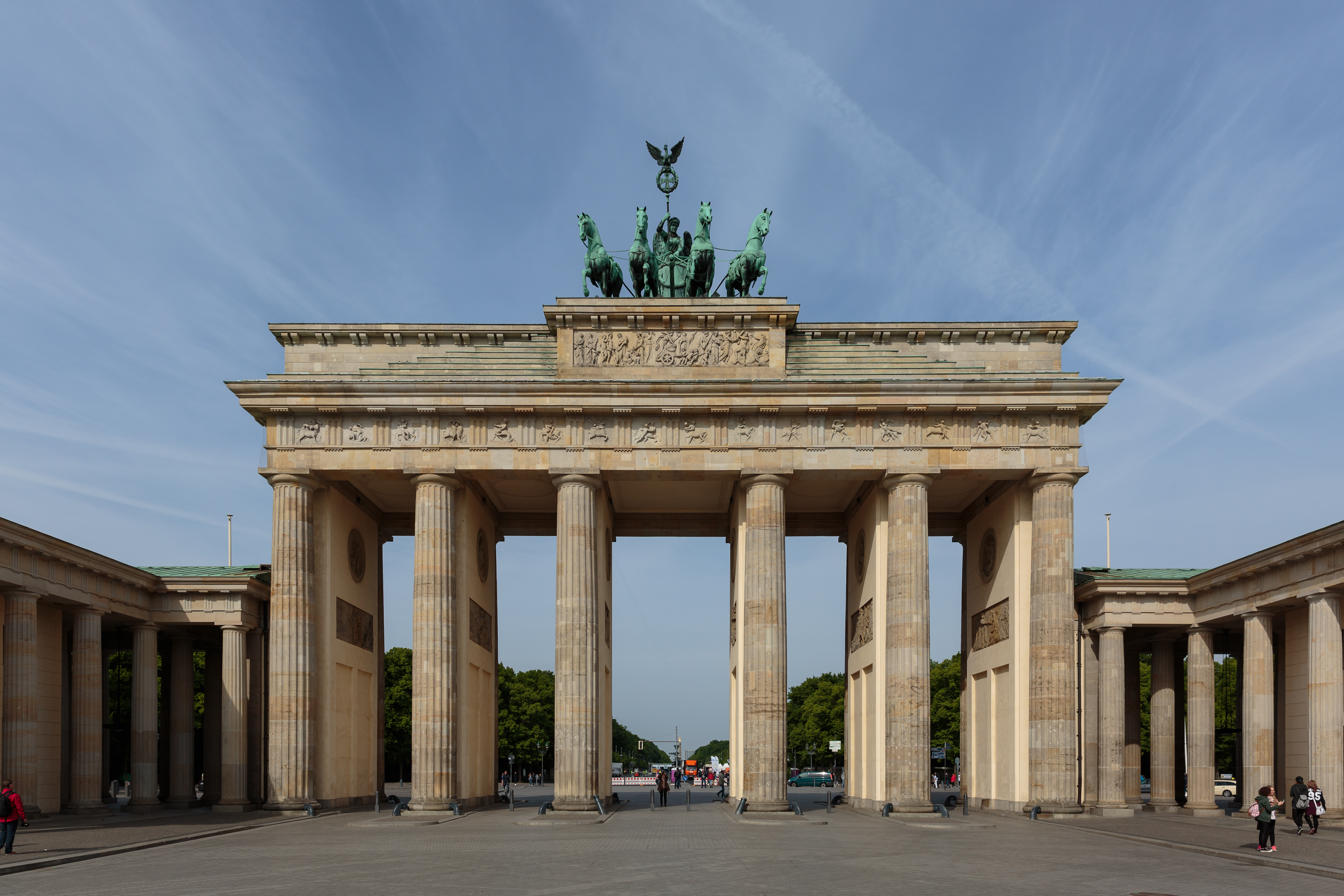
Brandenburg Gate in Berlin, 1791; Doric order, but Ionic-style fluting.

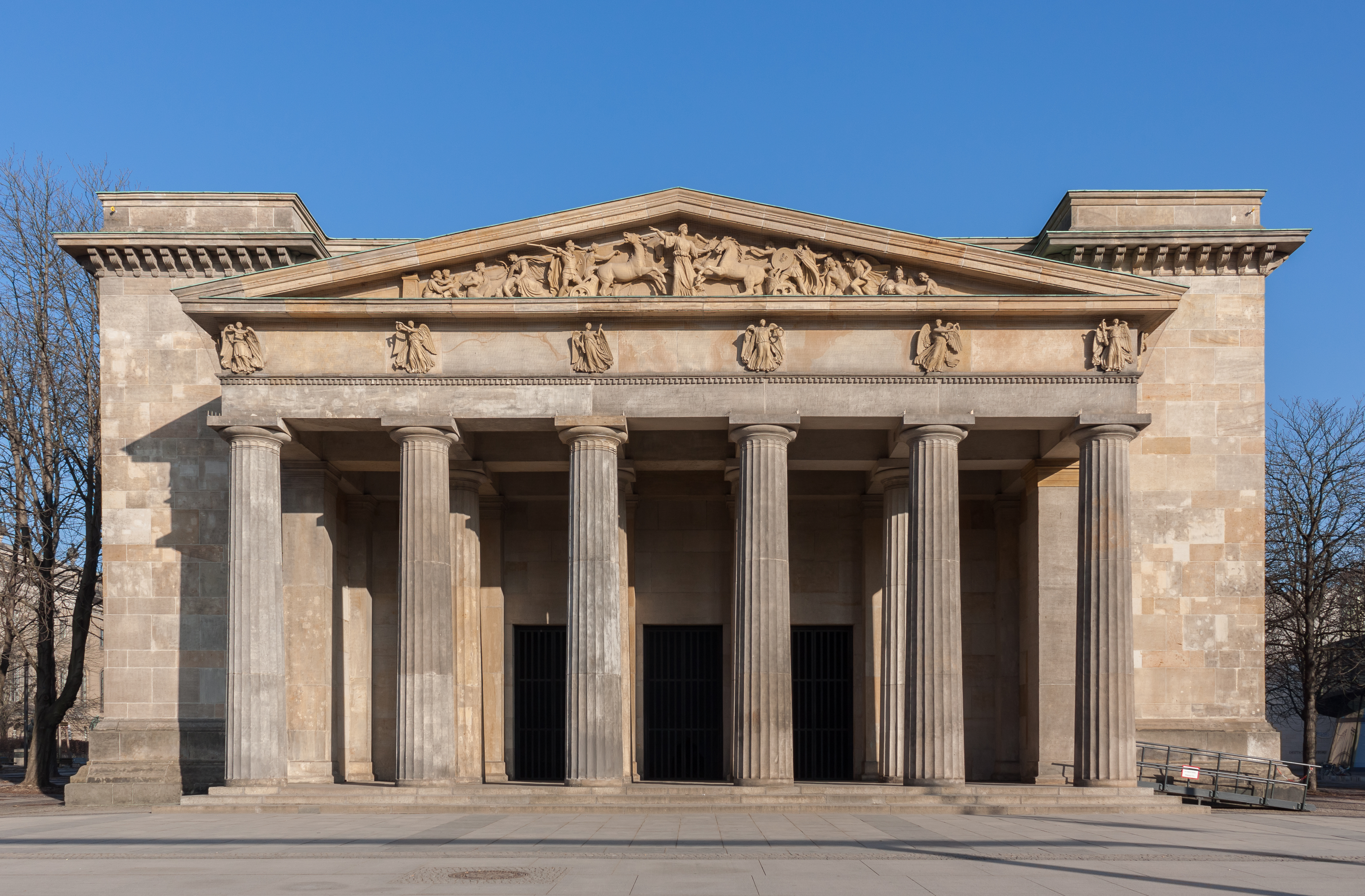
Neue Wache in Berlin, 1818

Fluting dramatically returned to European architecture in the late 18th century with Neoclassical architecture, especially Greek Revival architecture. By this time publications which measured and illustrated authentic Greek Doric buildings were available, and a stark Doric look became fashionable in Germany (where it was partly a gesture against over-elegant French styles), Britain and the United States. Fluting became more common, even usual for grand buildings, even in the Ionic and Corinthian orders.

A gentler version of the style is exemplified throughout many government buildings and monuments in the United States, though some buildings like the Lincoln Memorial in Washington, D.C. (1922), continued to use Greek Doric with no bases to the columns. In the 20th century New Classical architecture made considerable use of fluting.

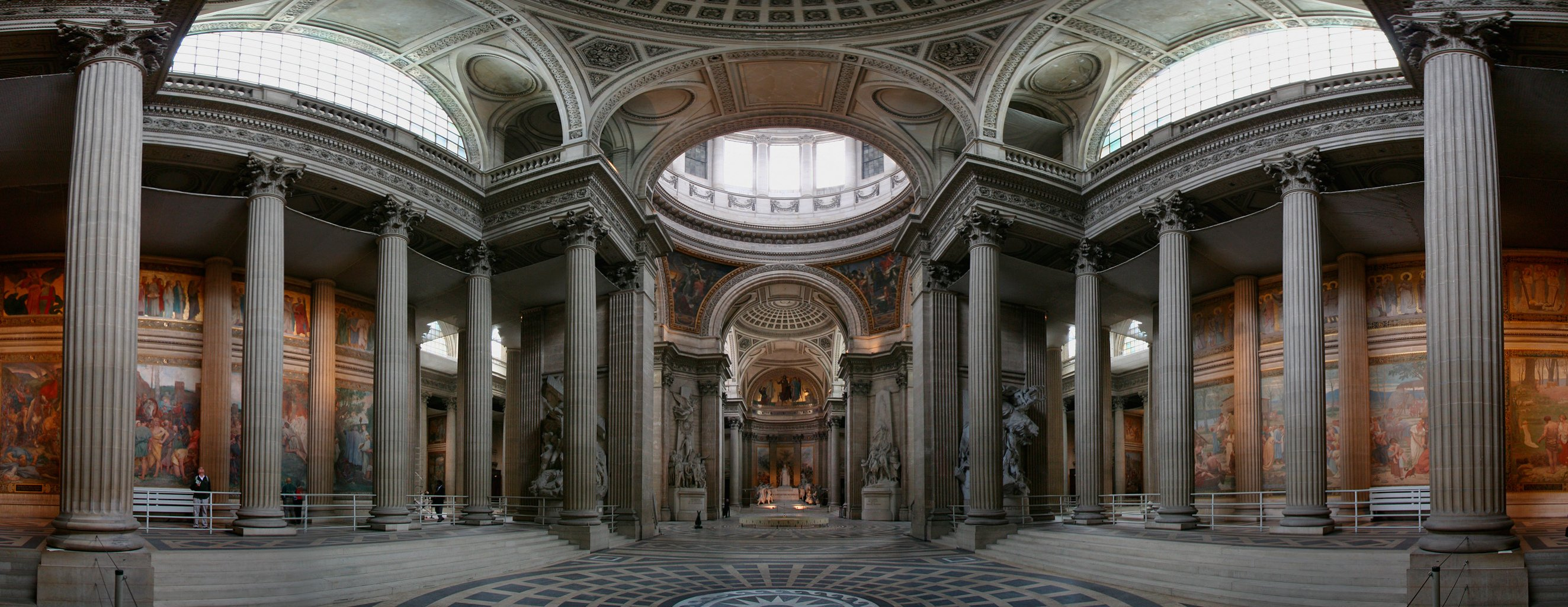
Fluted columns and pilasters inside The Panthéon, Paris

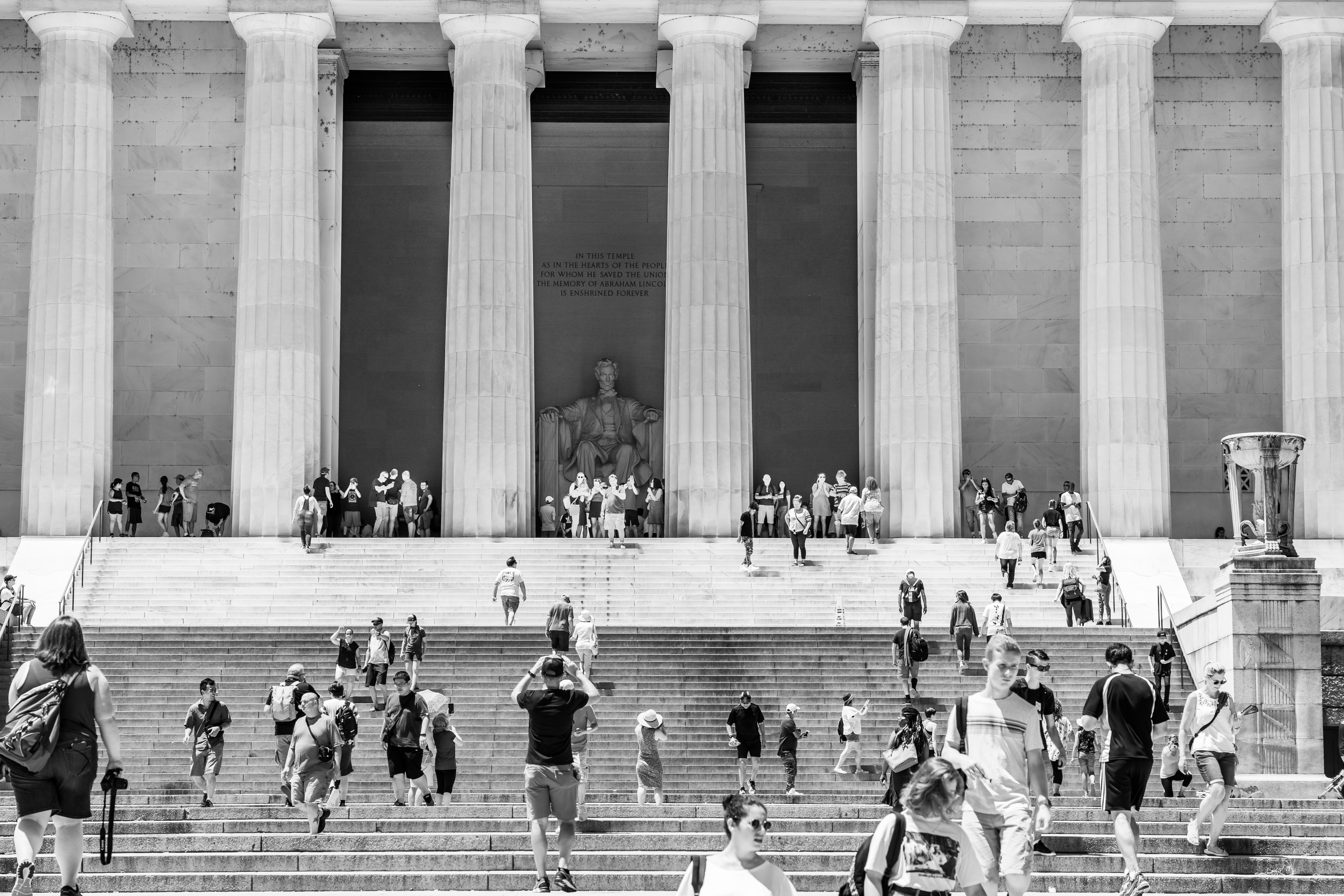
Lincoln Memorial, Washington, D.C., 1922

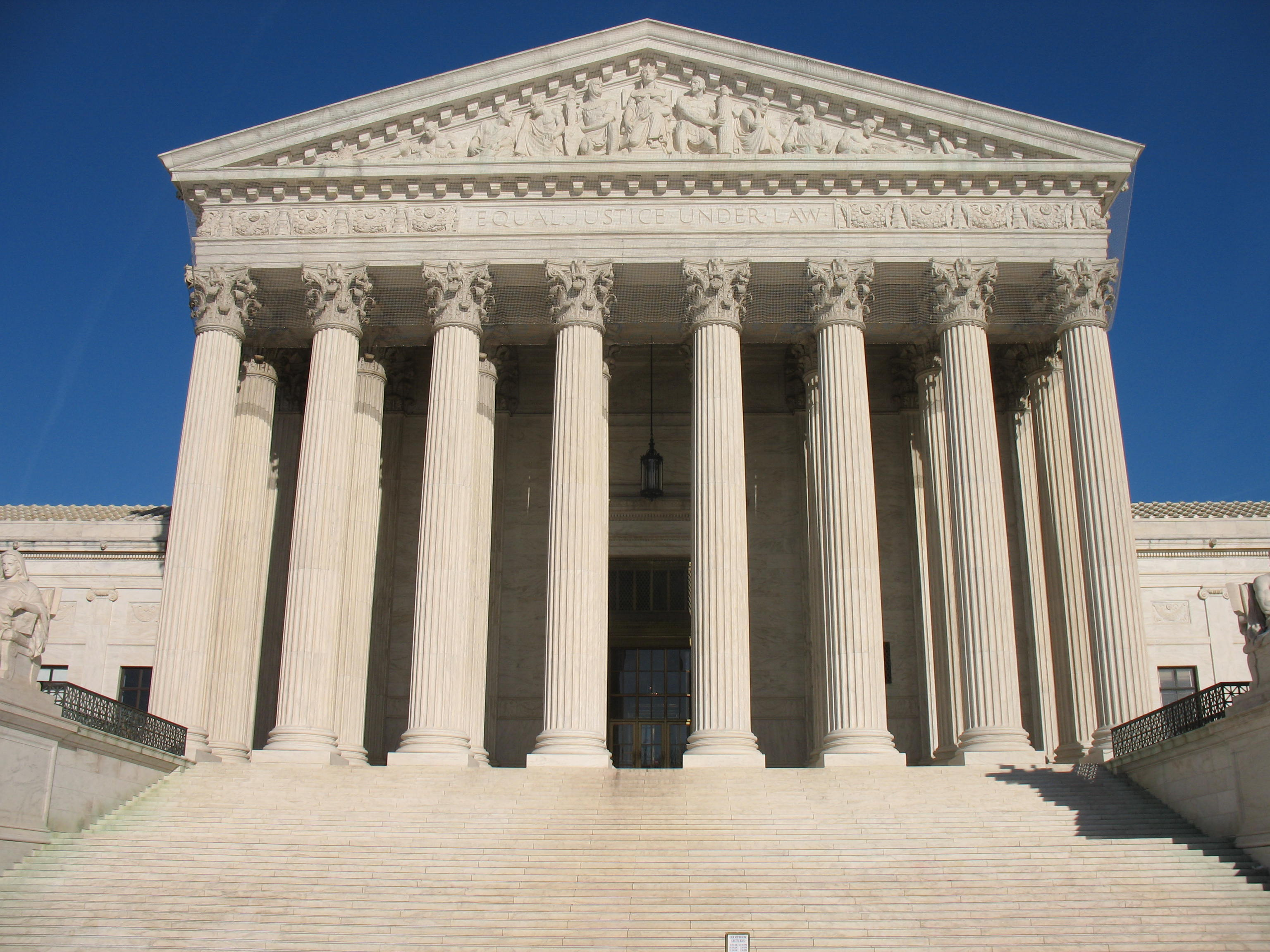
Supreme Court building, Washington, D.C.

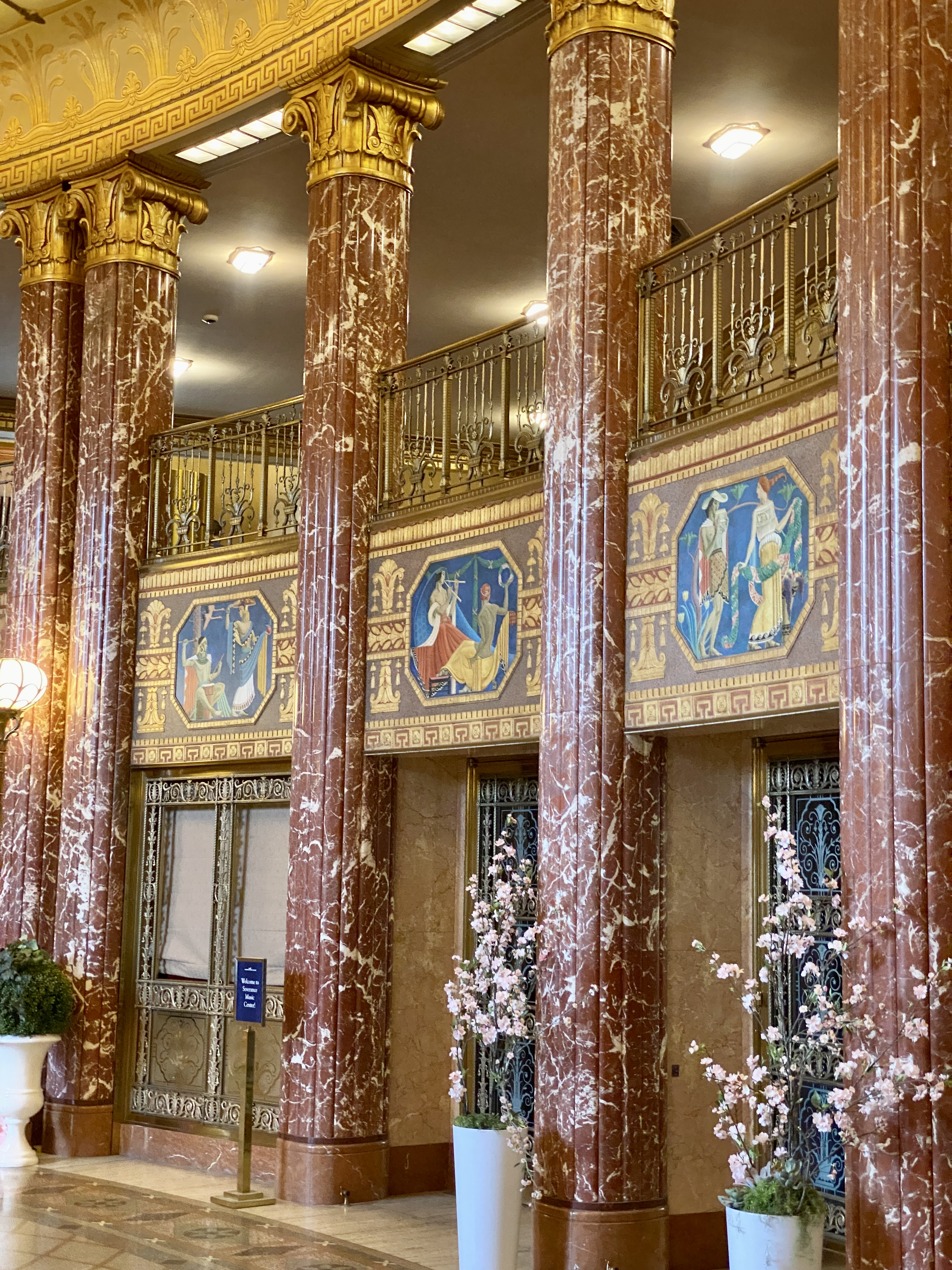
Art Deco classicism, Grand Foyer, Severance Hall, Cleveland, Ohio

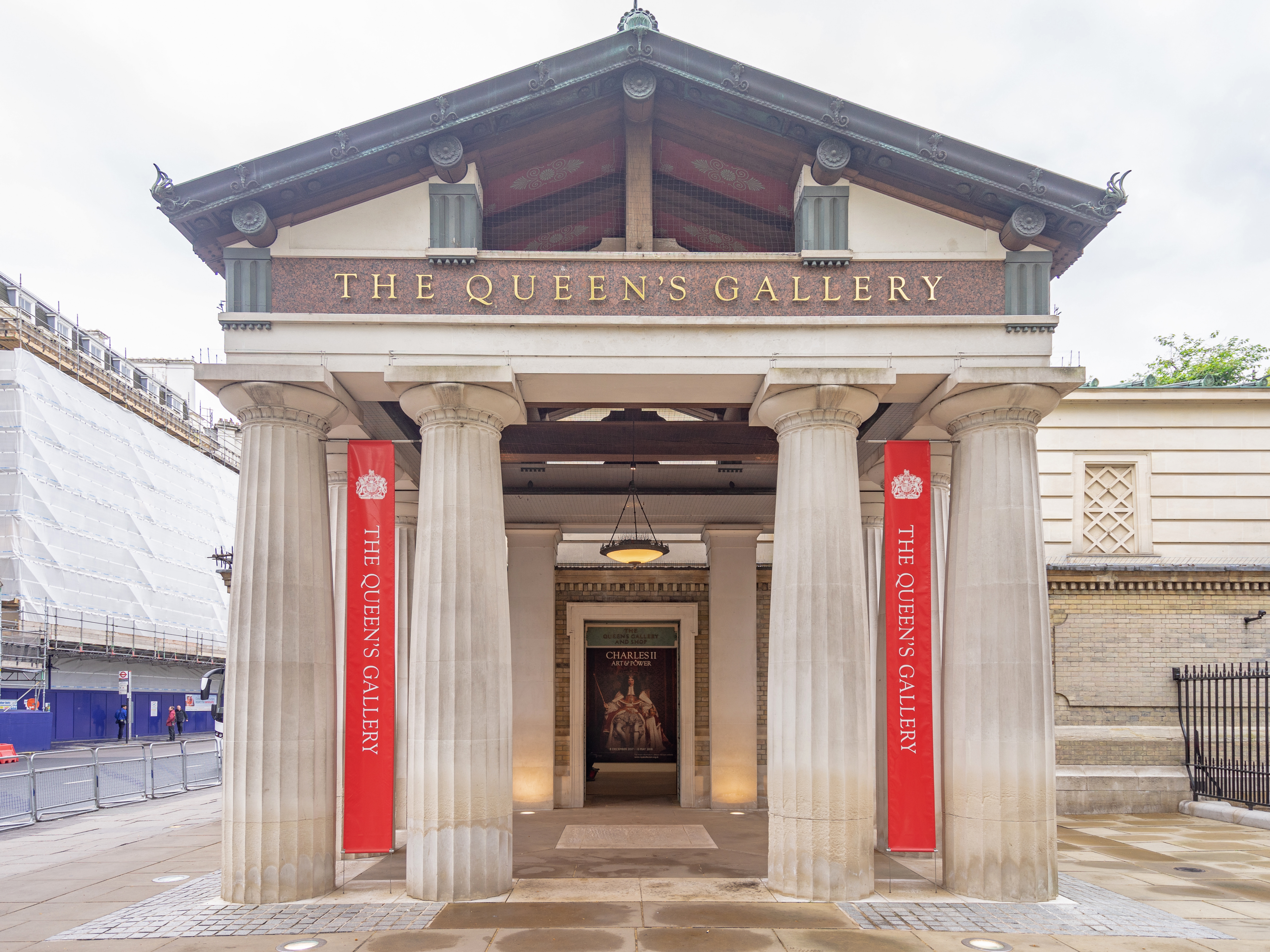
Queen's Gallery, Buckingham Palace, entrance, 2002

=== Decorative arts ===
Fluting, very often convex, is also found in various media in the decorative arts, including metalware, wooden furniture, glass and pottery. It was common in English cut glass of the Georgian period. In metal plate armour, fluting was very practical, strengthening the plate against heavy blows. It was especially common in the early 16th-century style called Maximilian armour, after Maximilian I, Holy Roman Emperor.

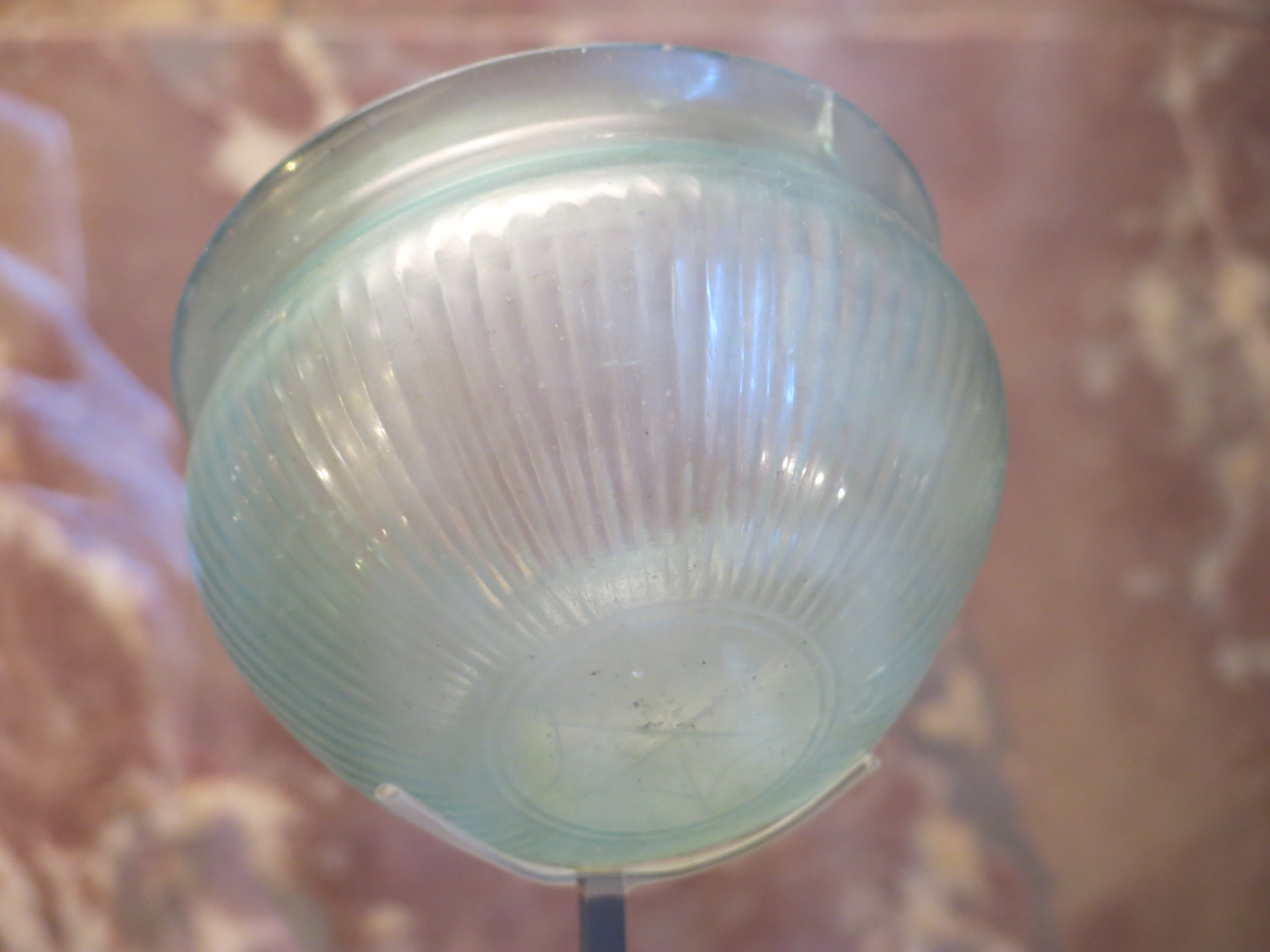
Ancient Greek fluted bowl, 150–100 BC, glass, Louvre

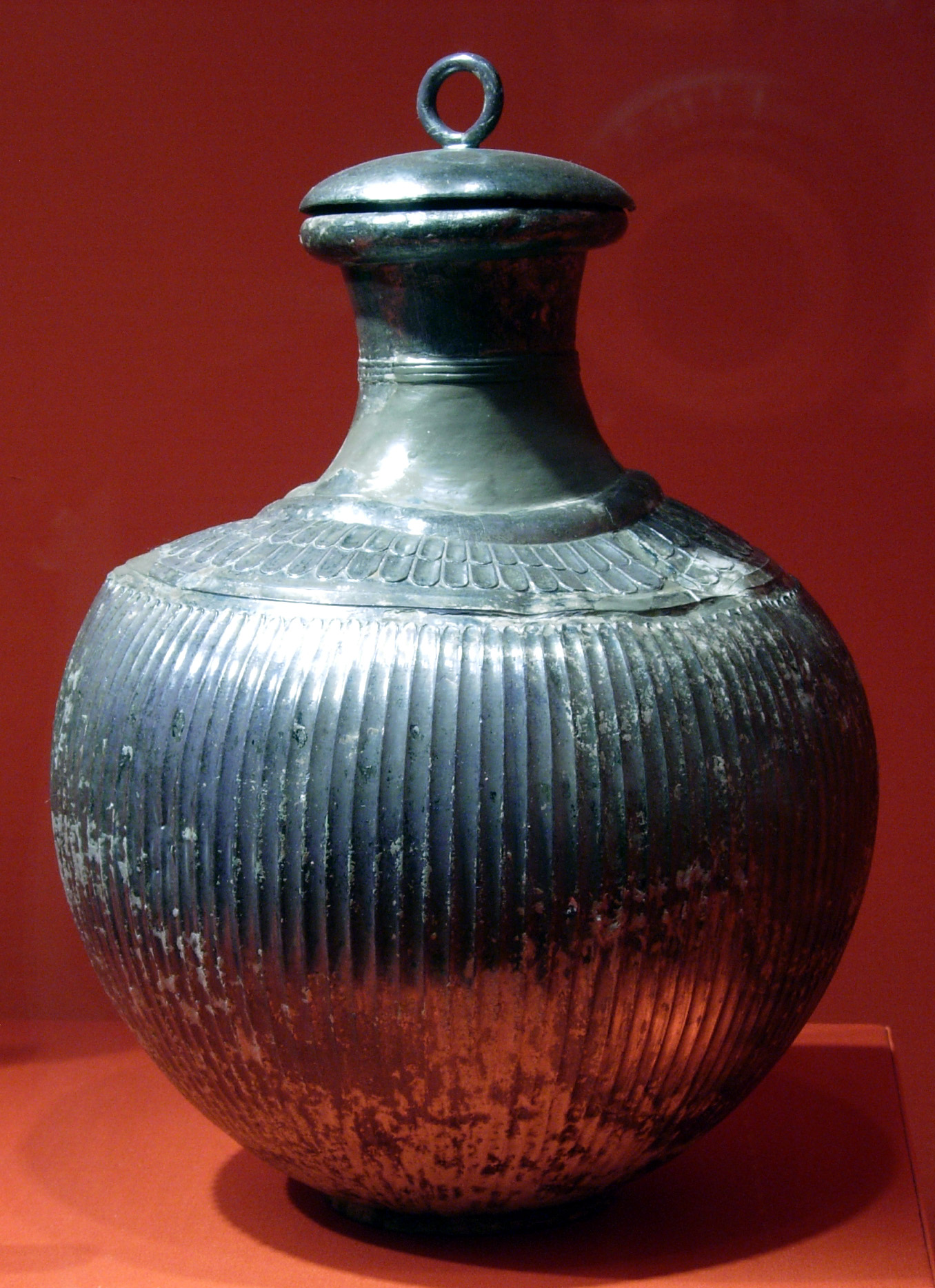
Ancient Egyptian bottle, 100 BC-100 AD, silver, Metropolitan Museum of Art, New York

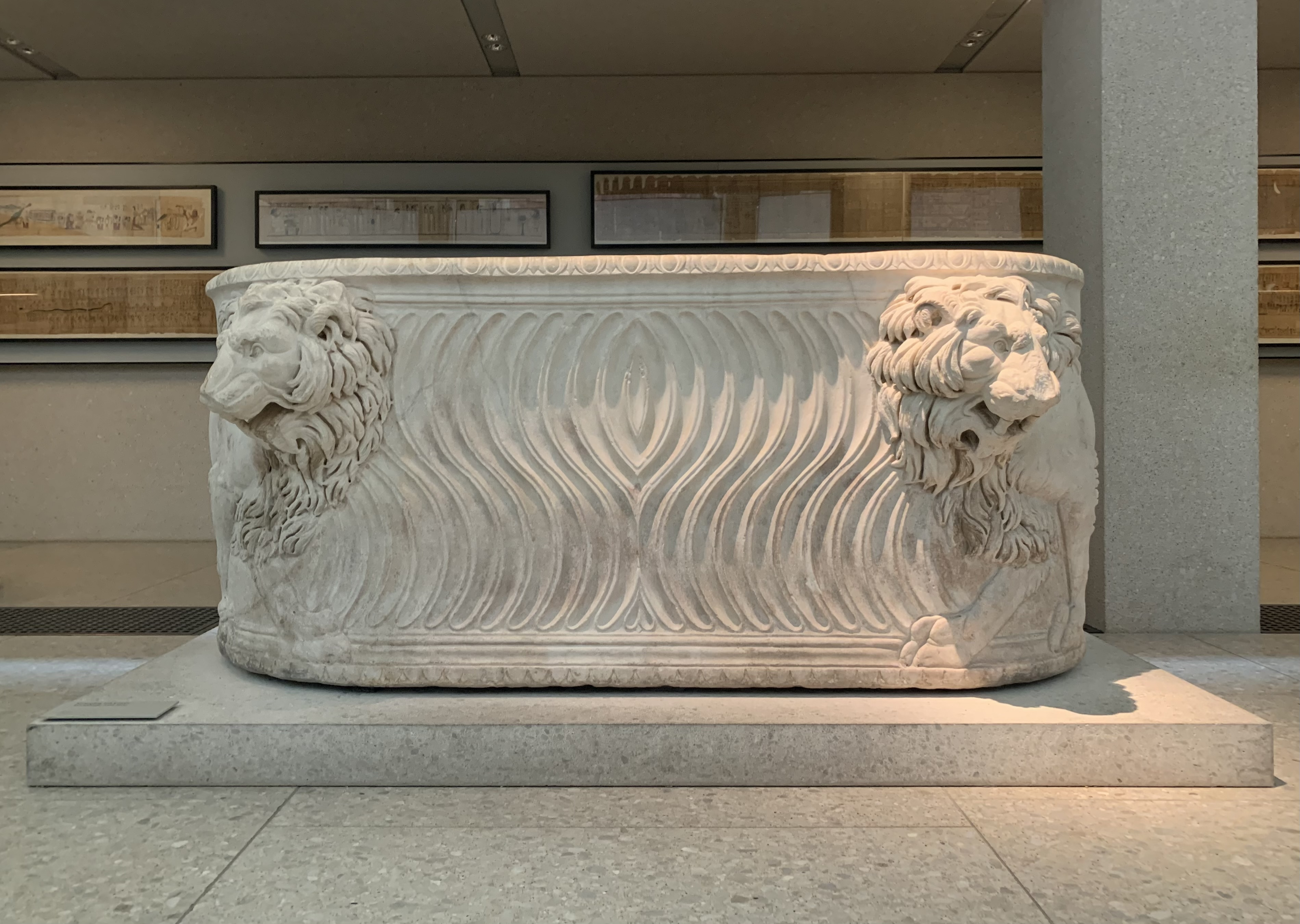
Roman sarcophagus with lions, 3rd century AD, marble, Neues Museum, Berlin

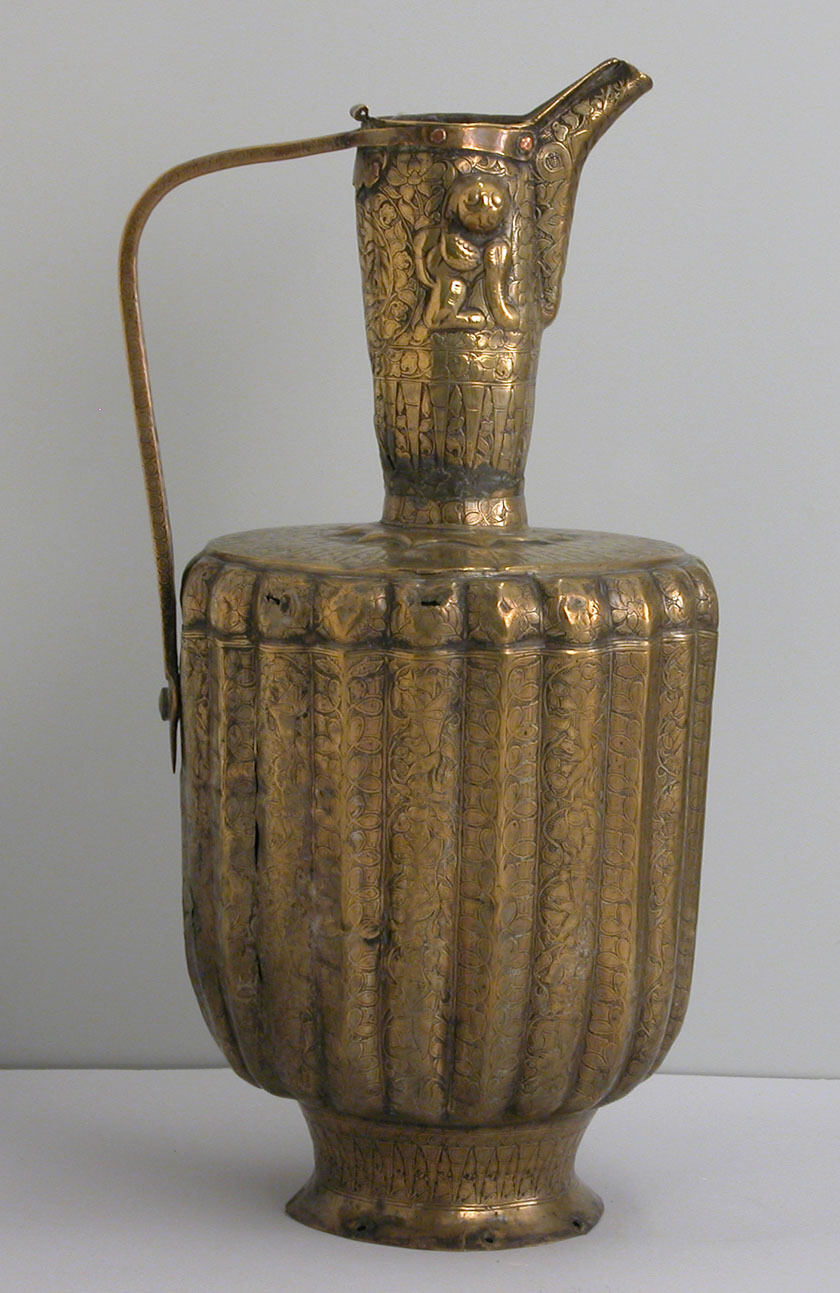
Islamic ewer, probably Iranian, late 12th–13th century, brass, fluted, engraved and repoussé, originally inlaid with silver, Metropolitan Museum of Art

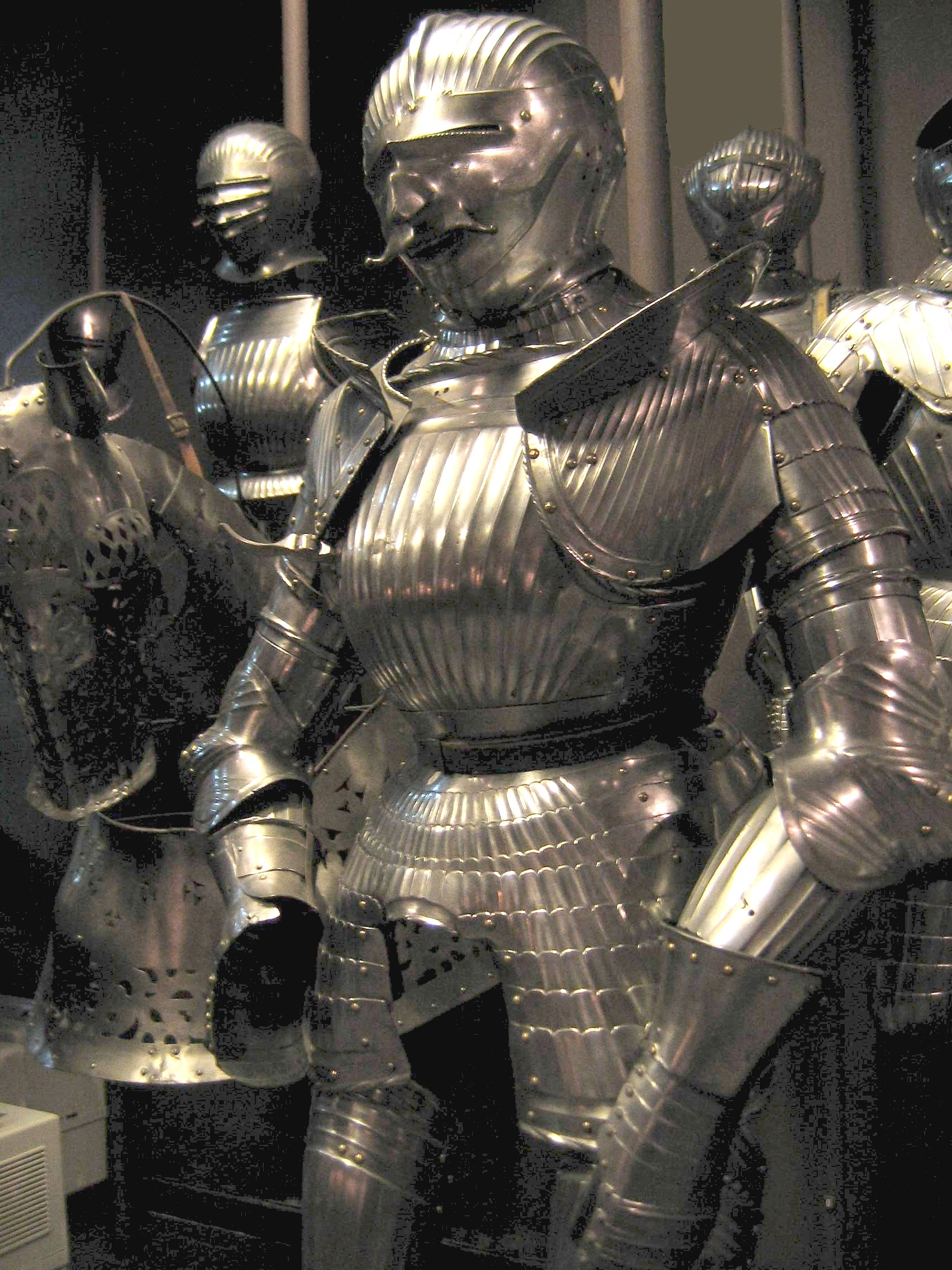
Maximilian armour, Germany, 1510s

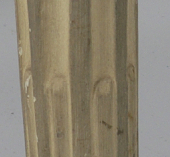
Cabled (stopped, ribbed) flutes on a French chair leg

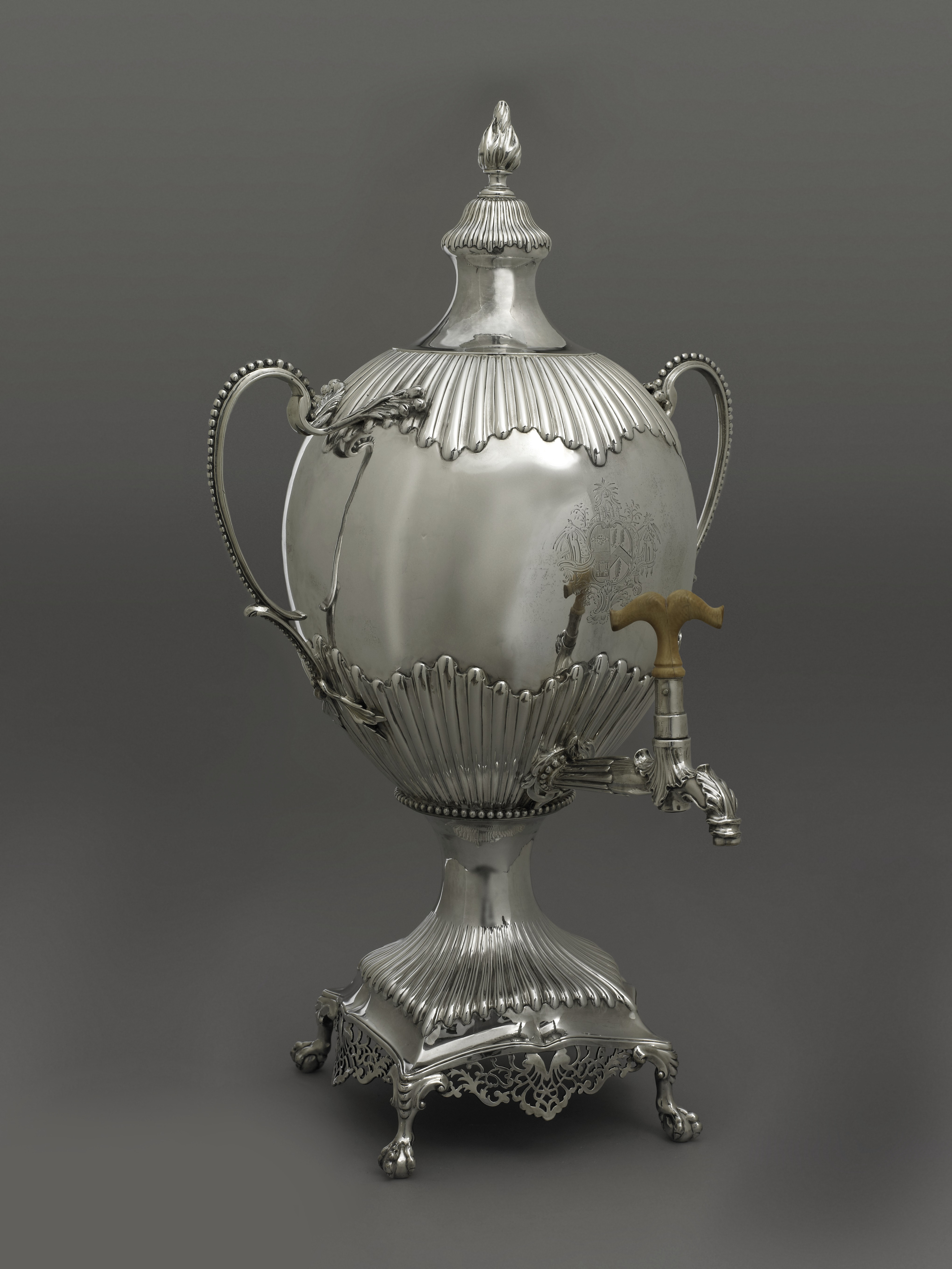
Silver tea urn and base, England, 1770–71

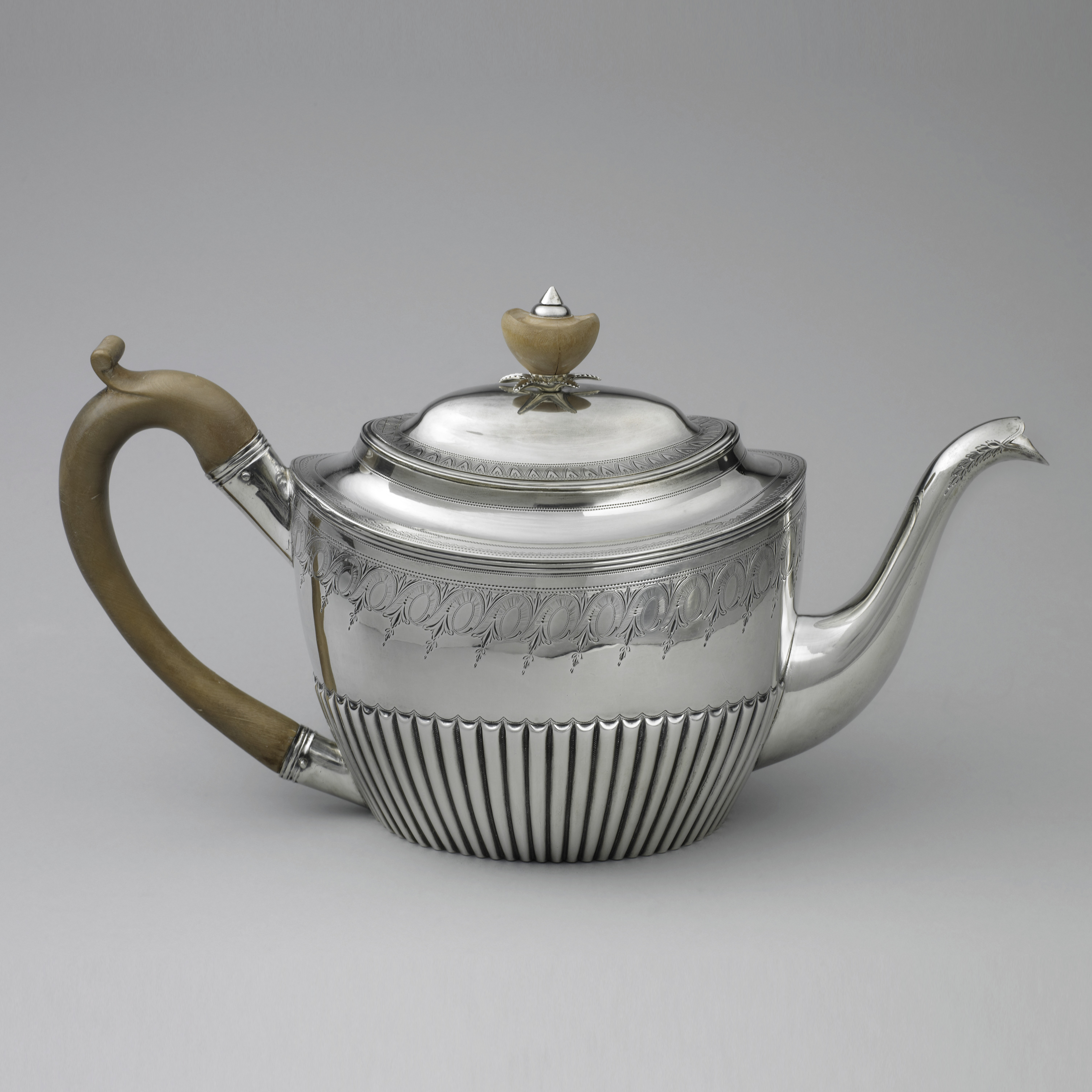
Teapot, England, 1798–99

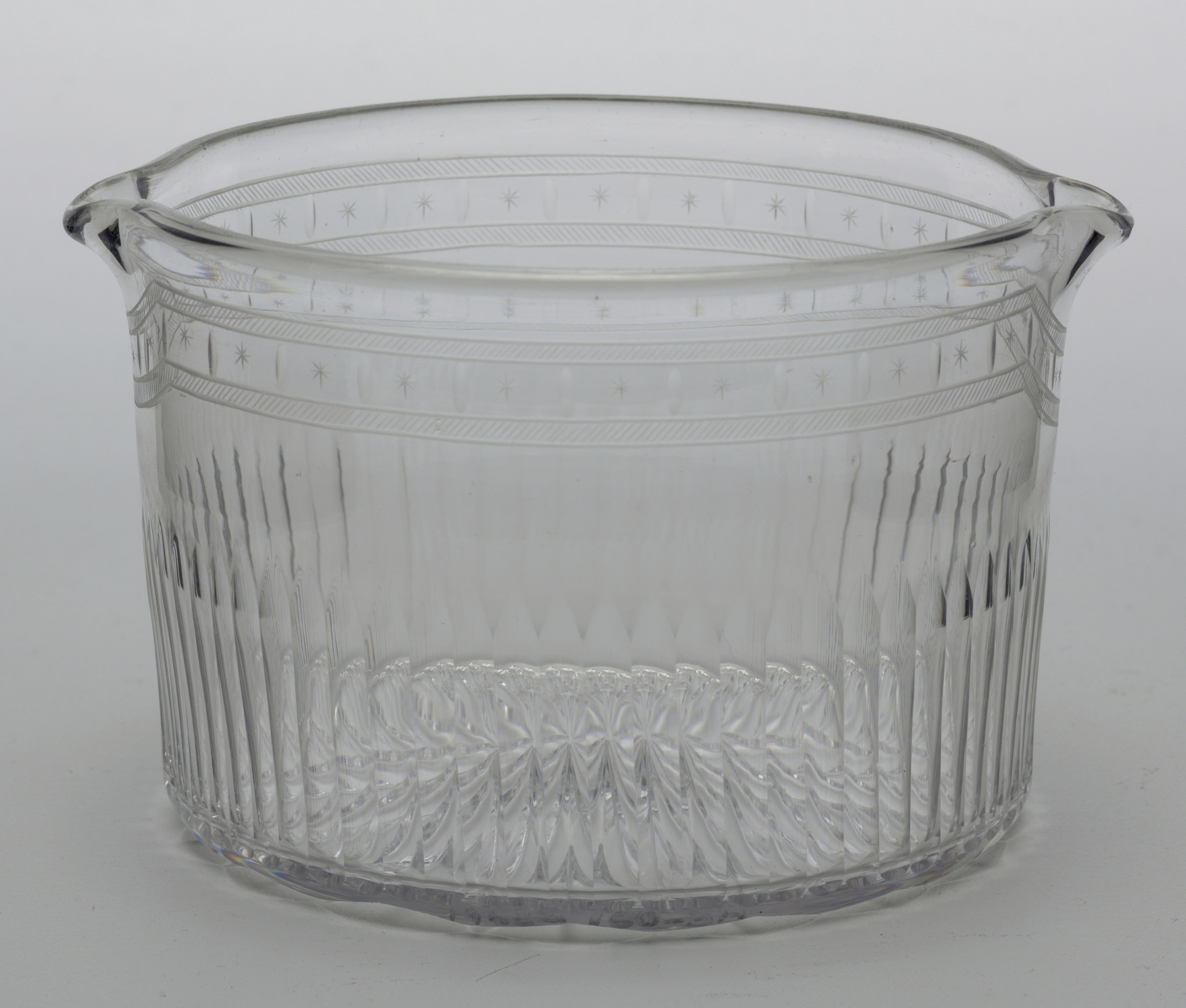
Wine rinser with cut glass fluting and engraving above, England, late 18th-century

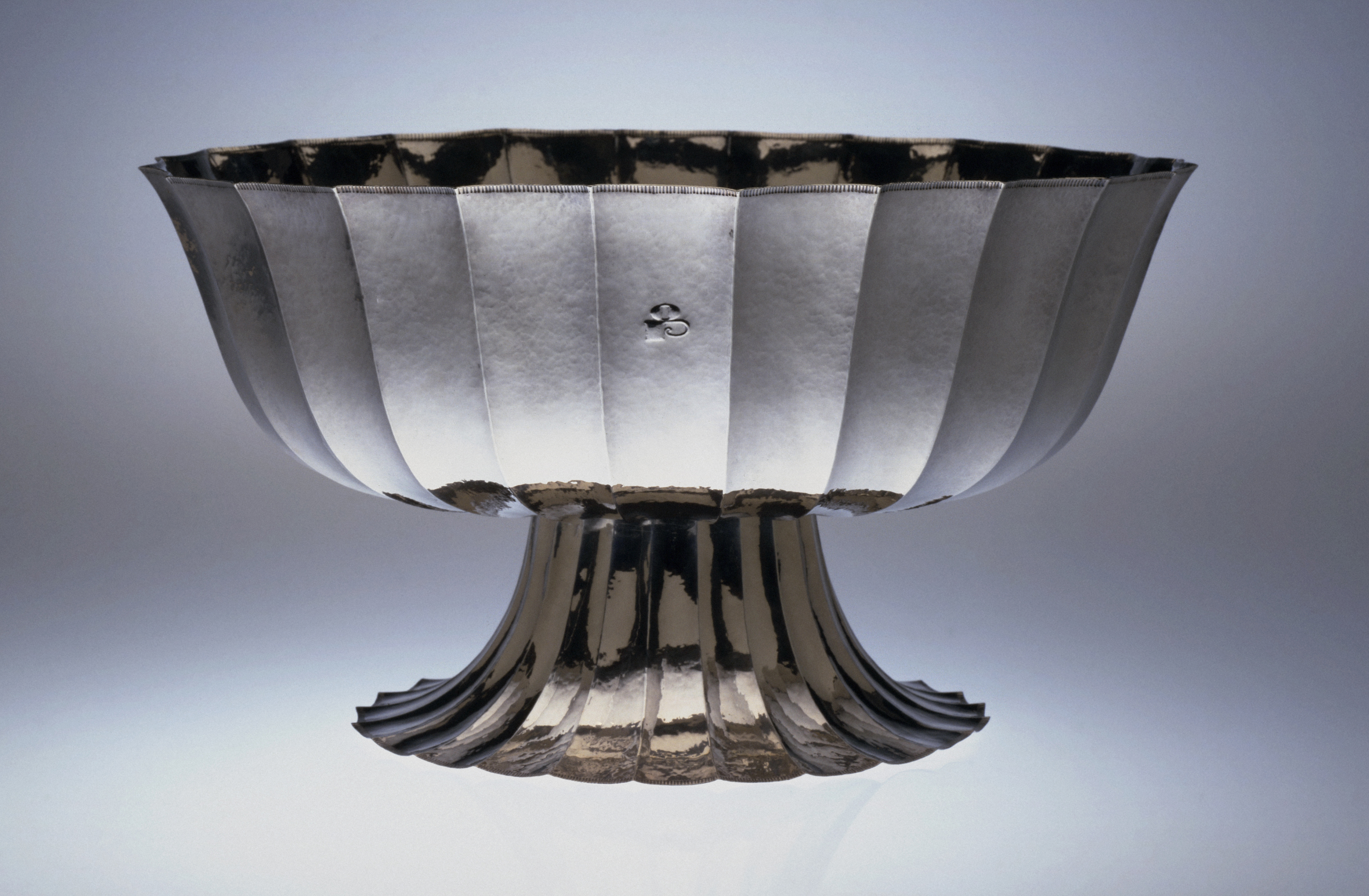
Austrian silver fruit bowl, 1917

== See also ==
- Fluting (geology)
- Solomonic column
- Gadrooning: curving convex fluting
- Reeding: the opposite of fluting
- Molding (decorative)
