= Cathedral floorplan =

Diagrammatic explanation of a church's arrangement

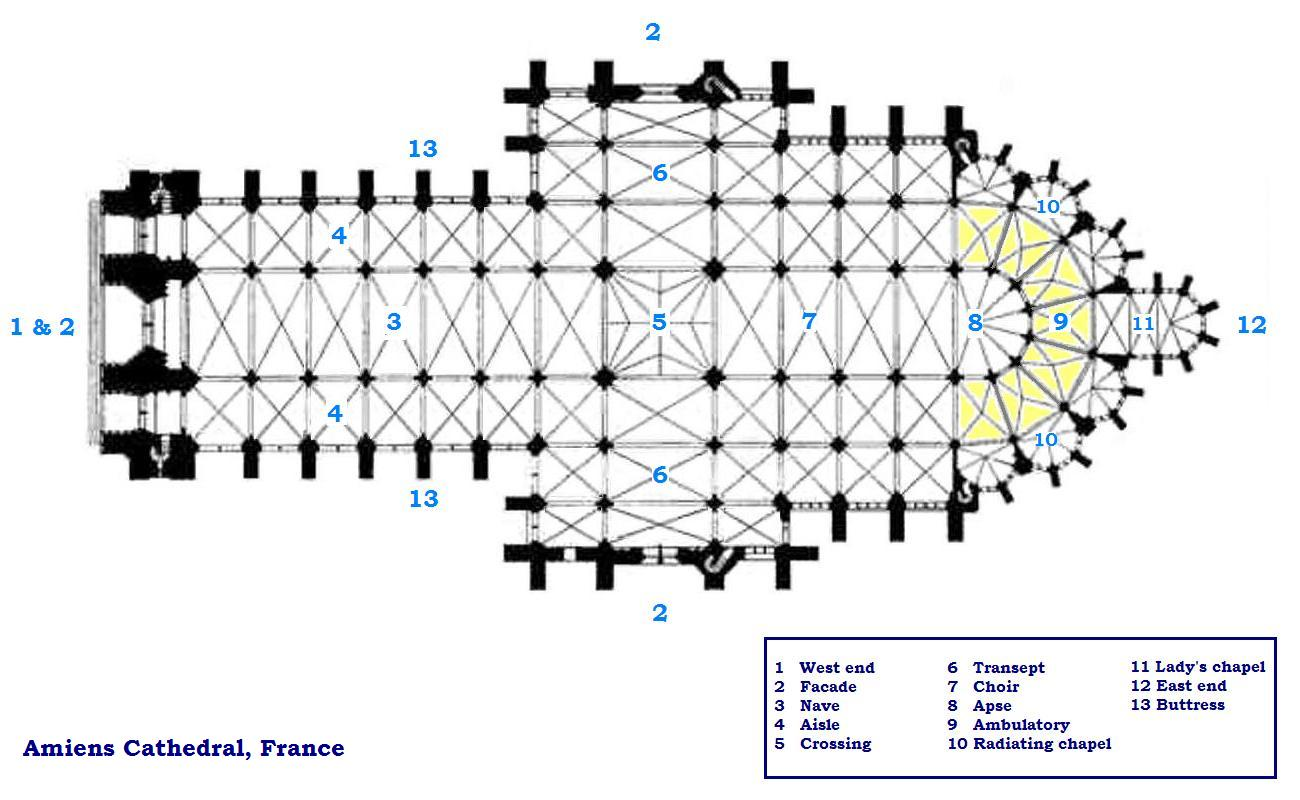
Amiens Cathedral floorplan: massive piers support the west end towers; transepts are abbreviated; seven radiating chapels form the chevet reached from the ambulatory

In Western Christian ecclesiastical architecture, a cathedral floorplan is a plan showing the arrangement of the building and the sections of walls and piers, giving an idea of their profiles. Light double lines in perimeter walls indicate glazed windows. Dashed lines show the ribs of the vaulting overhead. By convention, ecclesiastical floor plans are shown map-fashion, with north to the top and the liturgical east end to the right.

Many abbey churches have floor plans that are comparable to cathedrals, though sometimes with more emphasis on the chancel, including the choir spaces that are reserved for the religious community. Smaller churches are similarly planned, with simplifications.

== Design ==
Cathedral floor plans are designed to provide for the liturgical rites of the church. Before the legalization of Christianity by Emperor Constantine, Christians worshiped in private homes or in secretive locations. Once legally able to publicly worship, the local congregations adapted the available Roman designs to their needs. Unlike the Roman and Greek religions, where priests performed rituals without public participation, Christian worship involved the believers. Thus, the limited spaces typically used in pagan temples were not suitable to Christian worship. Roman civic buildings were designed for the participation of the citizens of the city, and thus the Roman Basilica was adopted for Christian purposes. This included an entry on one end of a long narrow, covered space with a raised dais at the other end. Upon the dais, public officials would hear legal cases, or expound on some matter of public interest.

== Glossary ==
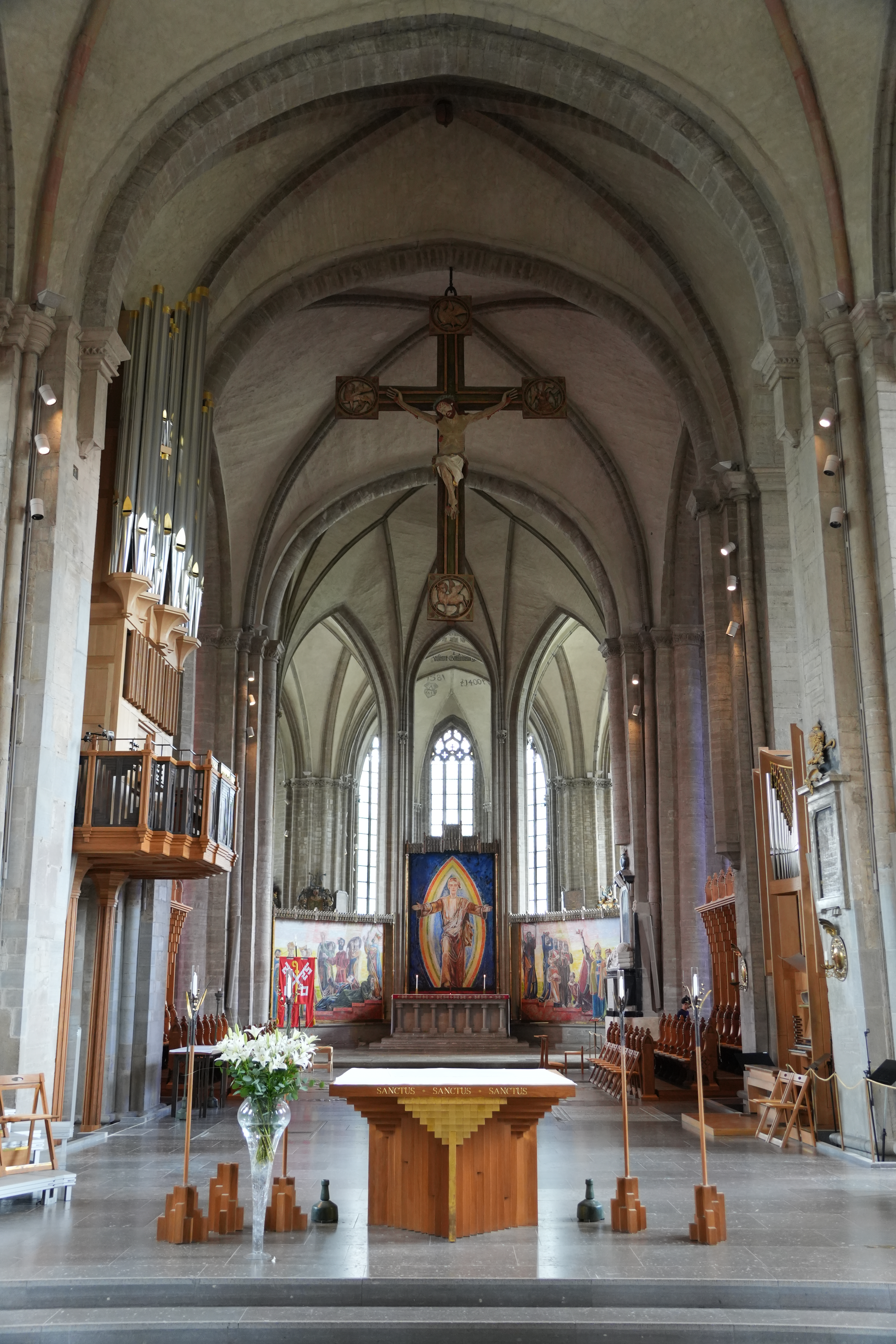
The chancel of Linköping Cathedral (Evangelical-Lutheran) in Sweden. The high altar for the celebration of Mass ad orientem is located against the eastern wall of the cathedral.

- Aisle: A pair of walkways that are parallel to the primary public spaces in the church, e.g. nave, choir and transept. The aisles are separated from the public areas by pillars supporting the upper walls, called an arcade.
- Ambulatory: A specific name for the curved aisle around the choir
- Apse: The end of the building opposite the main entry. Often circular, but it can be angular or flat. In medieval traditions, it was the east end of the building.
- Buttress: Large stone pier holding the roof vaults in place. A buttress may be visible as in the Gothic flying buttress, or it may be hidden in the complex of aisles and galleries.
- Cathedral: The home church of a bishop, which contains the cathedra or bishop's chair. The church may be of any size.
- Chancel (sanctuary or presbyterium): An elevated platform that contains the main altar and associated liturgical elements, often fenced by chancel rails from adjoining spaces. It is centered on the main east–west axis within the east end and generally located within the apse. It includes the quire.
  - Choir (or Quire): The part of the church usually beyond the transept and in line with the axis of the nave. It is located between the high altar and the rood screen, within the chancel. The area is higher than the level of the nave, though below the level of the high altar (see photograph of Linköping Evangelical-Lutheran Cathedral). The name choir is used because traditionally the clergy of the cathedral stood here as a chorus, chanting or singing during the responsive portion of Divine Offices or Mass.
- Chapel: A smaller space inside a church that has its own altar
  - Lady chapel: a chapel dedicated to "Our Lady", Mary, mother of Jesus
  - Radiating Chapels: Located around the Apse of the church, accessible from the Ambulatory.
- Crypt: Usually the below ground foundation. Used for burial or as a chapel.
- Facade: The outside of the church, where the main doors are located. In traditional medieval design, this faced the west and is called the West End.
- Narthex: The entrance or lobby area, located at the west end of the nave.
- Nave: The primary area of public observance of the Mass. It is generally the largest space, and located between the narthex and the chancel.
- Transept: Sometimes called the ‘Crossing’, the transept forms wings at right angles to the nave. In early Romanesque churches, it was often at the east end, creating a Tau Cross. Later designs placed the transept about two-thirds of the way from the West End to the East End. This created the Latin cross plan.

== See also ==
- Architecture of cathedrals and great churches
- Church architecture, including description of common terms
- List of largest church buildings
