= Bust of a Child =

Renaissance sculpture at the Louvre

Bust of a child
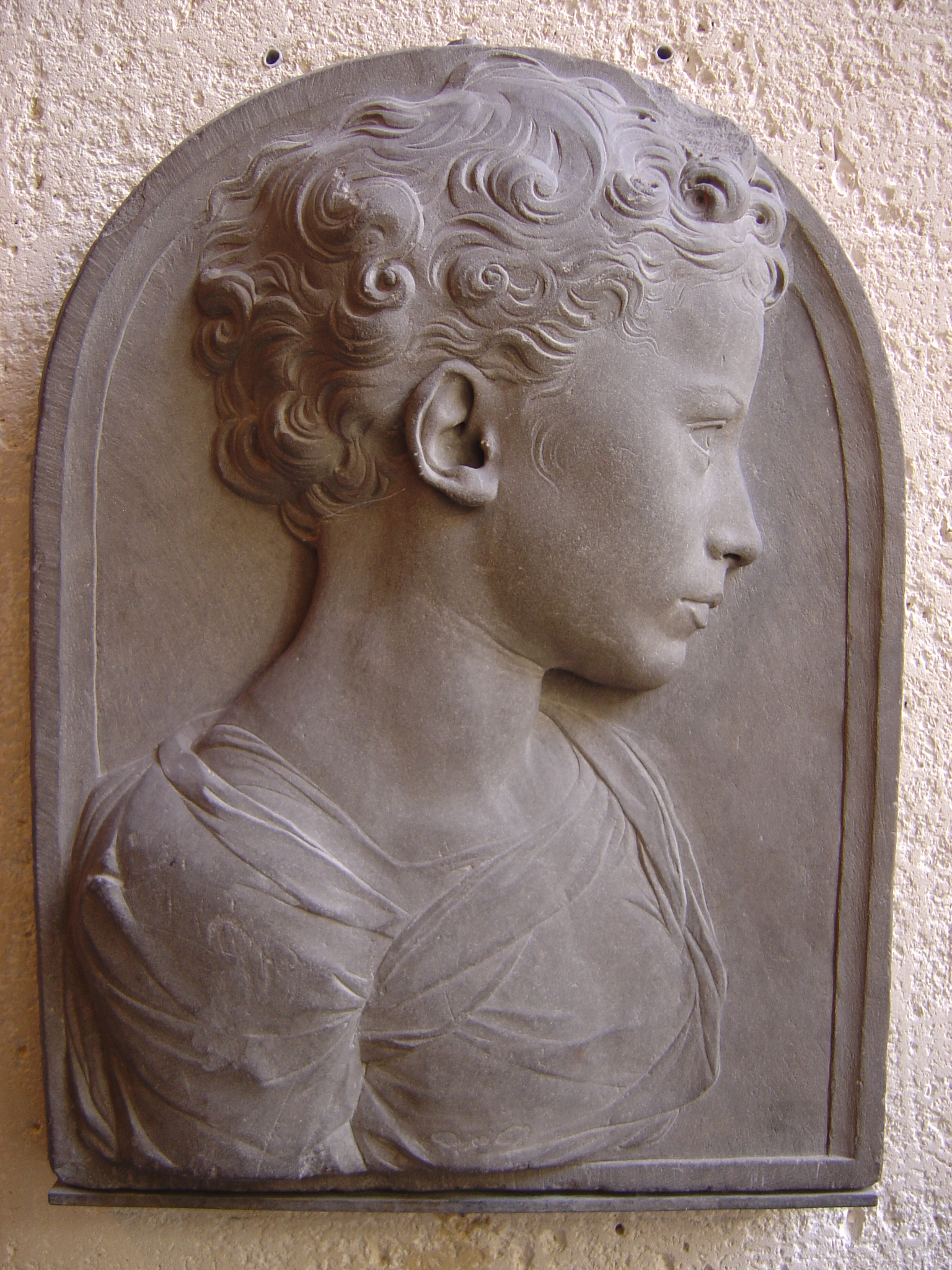
- Movement: Renaissance
- Dimensions: 40 cm × 30 cm (16 in × 12 in)
- Location: Louvre, Paris

Bust of a Child is the title given to a Tuscan grey sandstone (or pietra serena) Italian Renaissance sculpture in bas-relief. On its acquisition by the Louvre in 1859 it was thought to be a 1571 funerary monument and attributed to the French sculptor Jean Goujon. This attribution has been since dropped and it is now held to be by an unknown Florentine artist of the late 15th or early 16th century. It is still on display in Room 1 (also known as the "Donatello gallery") of the aile Denon at the Louvre.

== Sources ==
- "Site officiel du musée du Louvre". cartelfr.louvre.fr.
