= Scarsella (architecture) =

Type of church apse

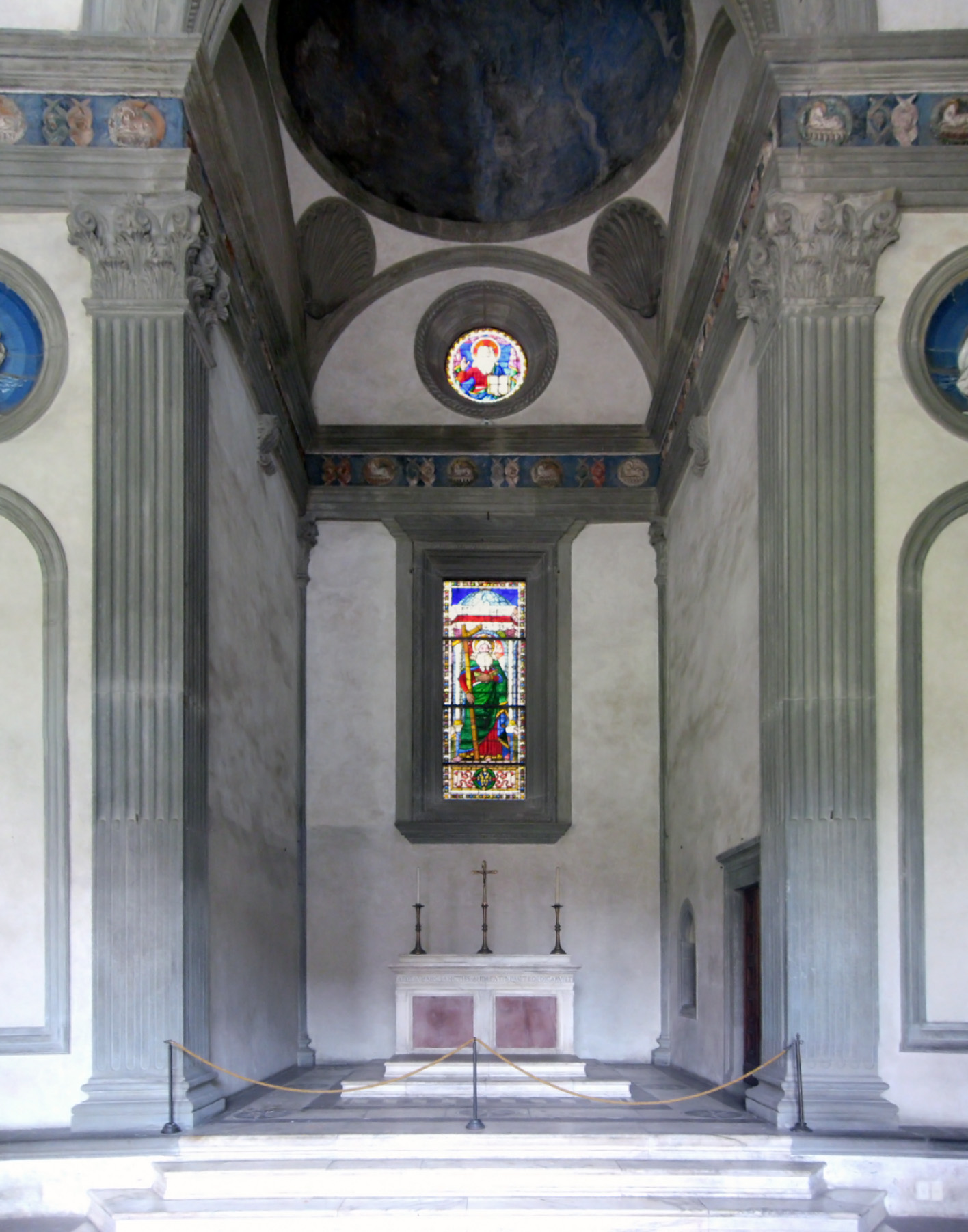
The choir on a square plan in the Pazzi Chapel in Florence

In Florentine architecture, the scarsella is a small apse with a rectangular or square plan which protrudes outside the main structure of a church. The term scarsella, in ancient Florentine, means "purse", in particular the leather purse for money.^{Ref?} Due to its local origin, the term is very scarcely used, and for the most part exclusively for the eastern apse of Florence Baptistery.

== Overview ==
The Baptistery of Florence which, built with an octagonal plan, initially equipped with a curved eastern apse, was replaced by a two-storeyed rectangular construction "in the 11th century or early 13th century". The term was also used for the medieval Cappellone degli Spagnoli in Santa Maria Novella, Florence, which served as a model for Filippo Brunelleschi to design the plans of the Sagrestia Vecchia of San Lorenzo and of the free-standing Pazzi Chapel, although in both cases the apses are flanked by sacristies. The impression of a part protruding from the main space is limited to the inside, while the ground plan of the structure is a closed rectangle.

Brunelleschi's studies with the simple forms of circle and square lead to a model of the chapel in which the base was square and the scarsella opened in the center of one of the walls, with the side dimension equal to a third of the chapel and with an area equal, therefore, to a one ninth of the entire chapel area. This scheme proved to be successful and was actively used by the great architects of the Renaissance, especially for centrally-planned buildings. Another example of a protruding multistoreyed apse is the church of Santa Maria dei Miracoli in Venice.

== See also ==
- Apse – Semicircular recess covered with a hemispherical vault or semi-dome
