= Sagrestia Vecchia =

Part of the church of San Lorenzo, Florence

Coordinates: 43°46′28.97″N 11°15′13.13″E

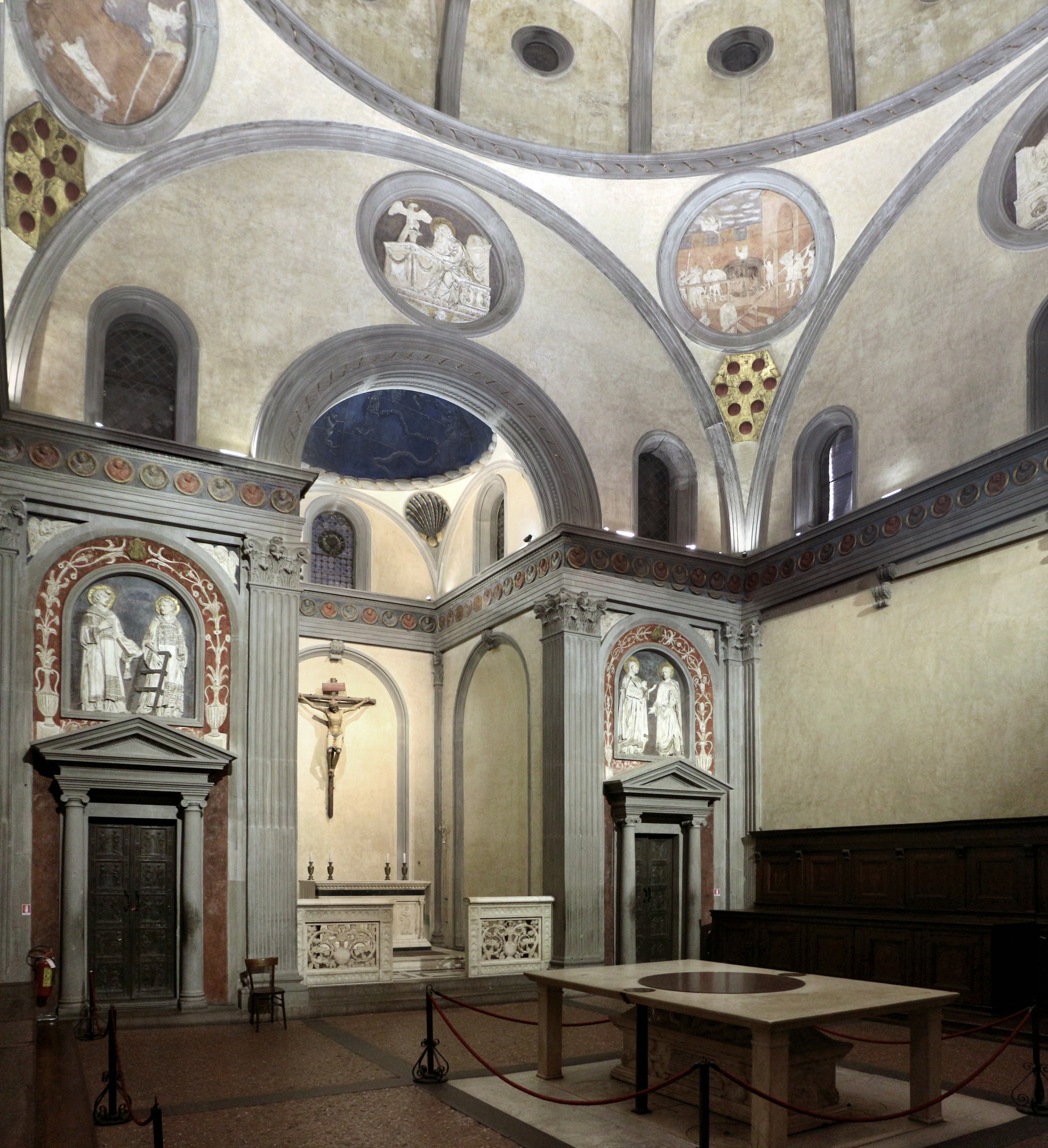
Interior

The Sagrestia Vecchia di San Lorenzo, or Old Sacristy of San Lorenzo, is the older of two sacristies of the Basilica of San Lorenzo in Florence, Italy. It is one of the most important monuments of early Italian Renaissance architecture. Designed by Filippo Brunelleschi and paid for by the Medici family, who also used it for their tombs, it set the tone for the development of a new style of architecture that was built around proportion, the unity of elements, and the use of the classical orders. The space came to be called the "Old Sacristy" after a new one was begun in 1510 on the other side of S. Lorenzo's transept.

== History ==
The structure was begun 1421 and largely complete in 1440. When finished, it was, however, quite isolated, the reason being that construction for the new building for San Lorenzo, the design for which Brunelleschi was also responsible, was not far along. It was only in the years after 1459 that the Old Sacristy was unified with San Lorenzo, connected to its left transept.

== Design ==
The plan is a perfect square with a smaller square scarsella or altar on the south side. The scarsella is axially positioned in the wall, and connected to the main space by an arched opening. The interior of the main space is articulated by a rhythmic system of pilasters, arches that emphasize the space's geometric unity. The pilasters are for purely visual purposes, and it was this break between real structure and the appearance of structure that constituted one of the important novelties of Brunelleschi's work. The pilasters support an entablature, the only purpose of which is to divide the space into two equal horizontal zones. The upper zone features pendentives under the dome, another relative novelty, more typical of Byzantine architecture. The dome is actually an umbrella dome, composed of twelve vaults joined at the center. It was not an uncommon design and Brunelleschi may have learned the technique from a visit to Milan or other places where such domes existed. What was new was the way in which the dome was integrated into the proportion of the space below. The use of color is restricted to grey for the stone and white for the wall. The correct use of the Corinthian order for the capitals was also new and a testament to Brunelleschi's studies of ancient Roman architecture.

The decorative details are by Donatello, who designed the tondos in the pendentives, the lunettes, the reliefs above the doors and the doors themselves.

The smaller dome above the altar is decorated with a depiction of astrological star constellation. The arrangement of the constellation is accurate enough to estimate the particular date it represents, although there has been disagreement on the intended date represented there. In 1911, Aby Warburg first made an attempt with the help of a Hamburg astronomer and concluded that the date was the July 9, 1422, the date of the consecration of the altar. Gertrud Bing later rejected this in favor of a calculation by Arthur Beer for July 6, 1439, the date of the closing session of the Council of Florence, in which the Articles of Union between Eastern and Western Christendom were signed by Latin and Greek delegates. A more recent recalculation by Professor John L. Heilbron has independently confirmed this date and even estimated the time of day at about noon.

== Tombs ==
In the center is the sarcophagus of Giovanni di Bicci de' Medici and Piccarda Bueri, by Buggiano. Set along one of the walls is the porphyry and bronze sarcophagus of Giovanni and Piero de' Medici by Verrocchio, who may also be responsible for the lavabo in the adjacent room on the left.

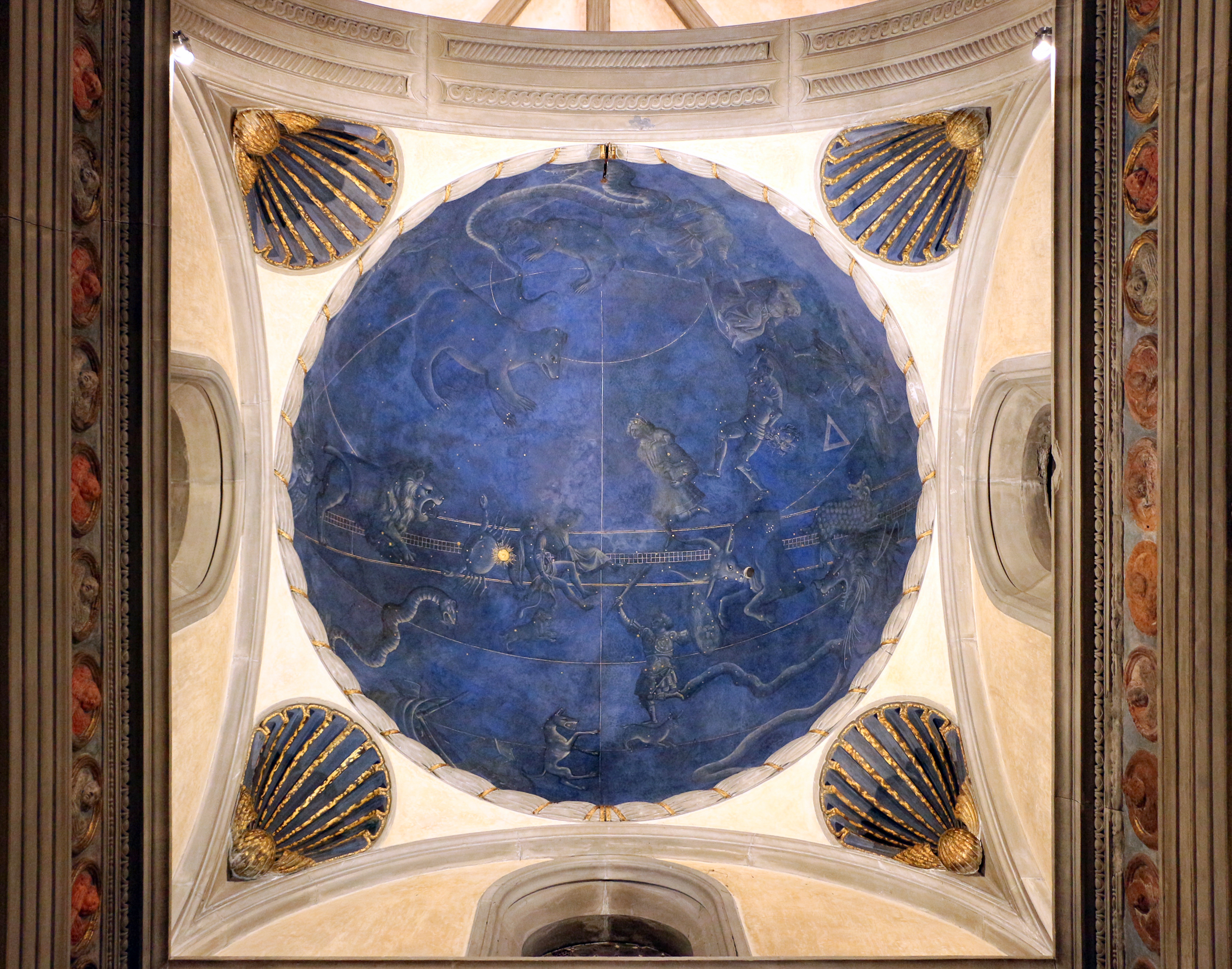
Dome above the altar with the fresco of the sky of July 6, 1439

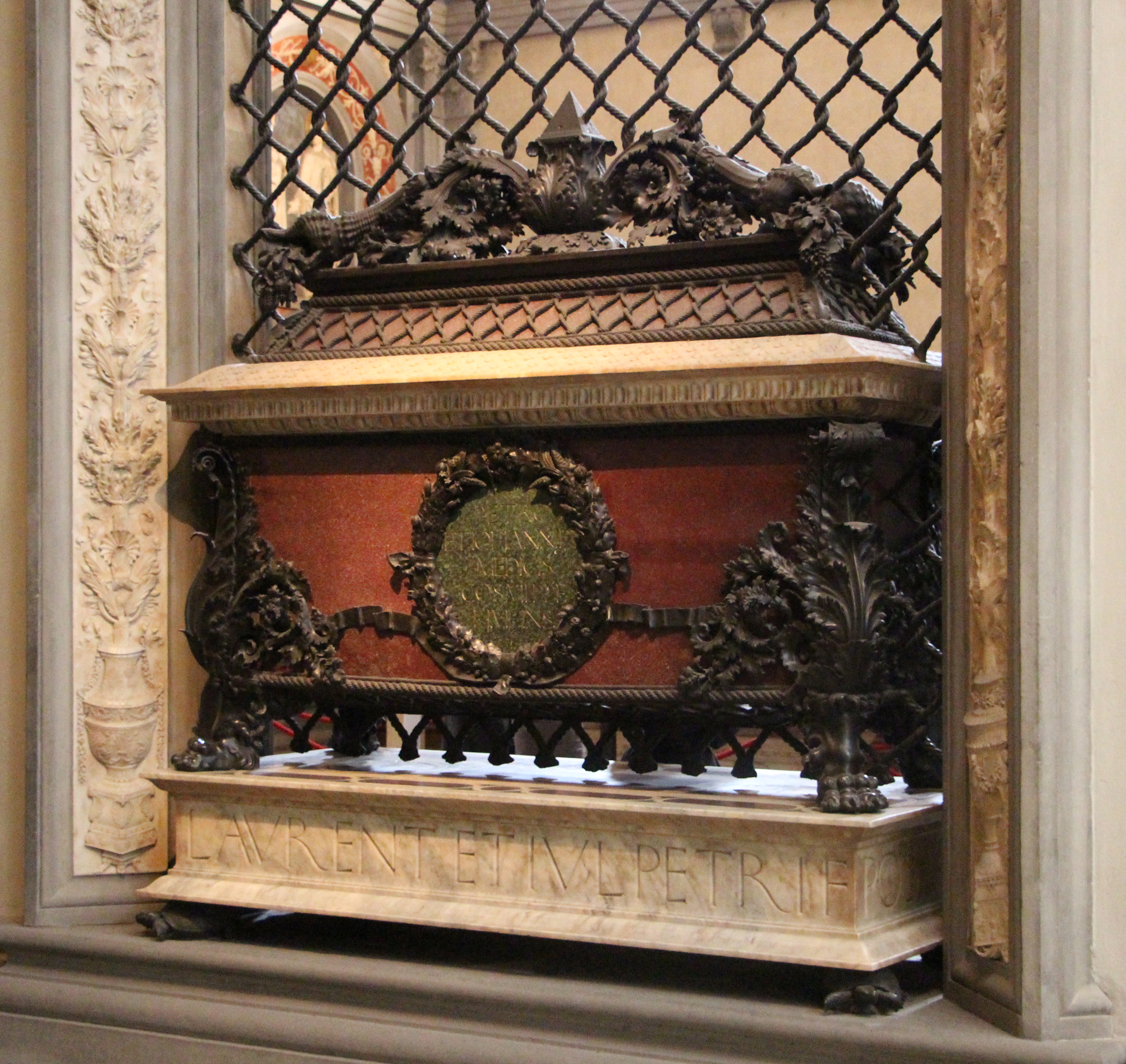
Tomb Giovanni and Piero de' Medici by Verrocchio, 1469–1472

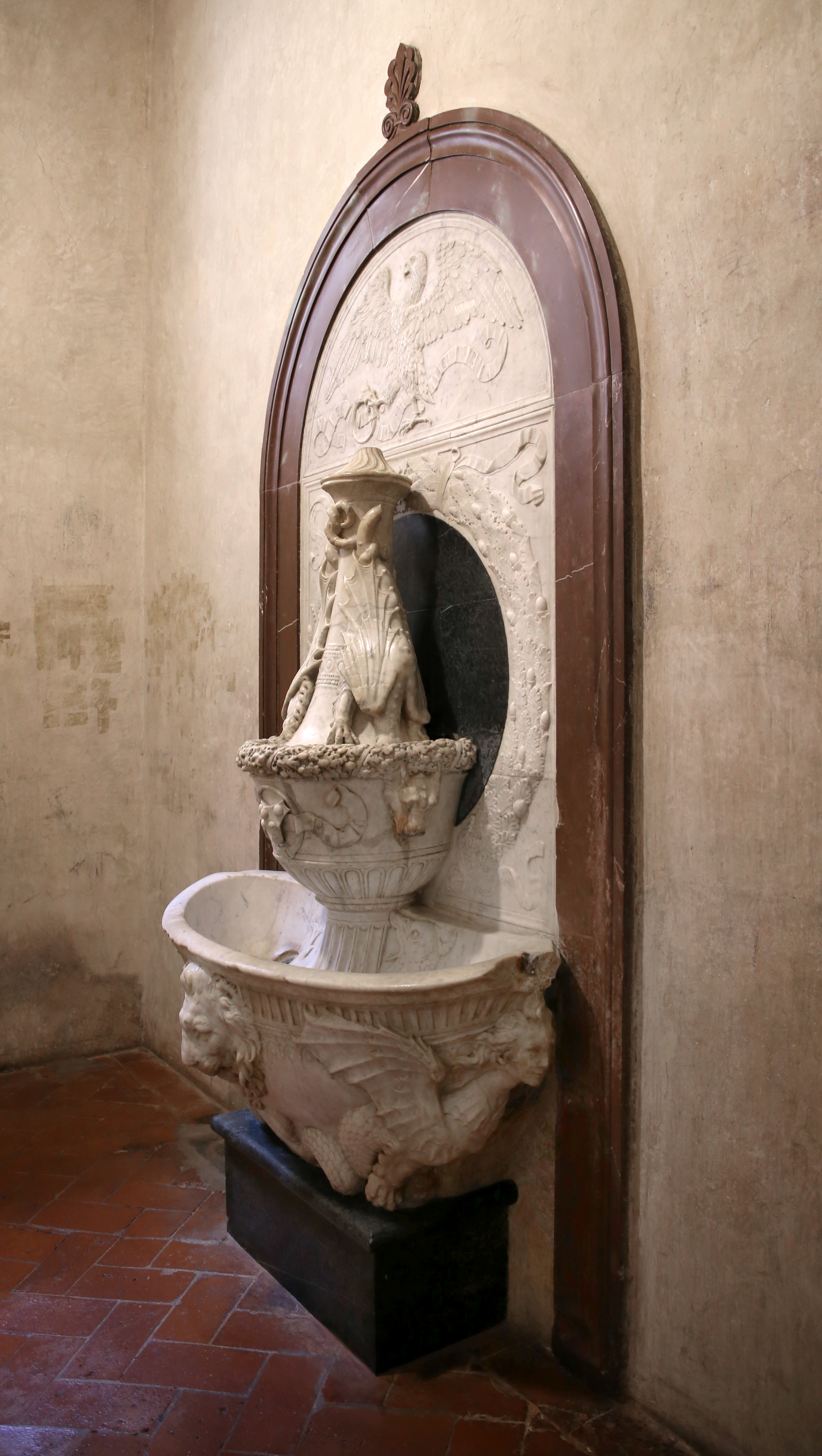
The lavabo, c. 1460–1470

== See also ==
- Late medieval domes
- Symbolism of domes
- Pazzi Chapel
