= Apse chapel =

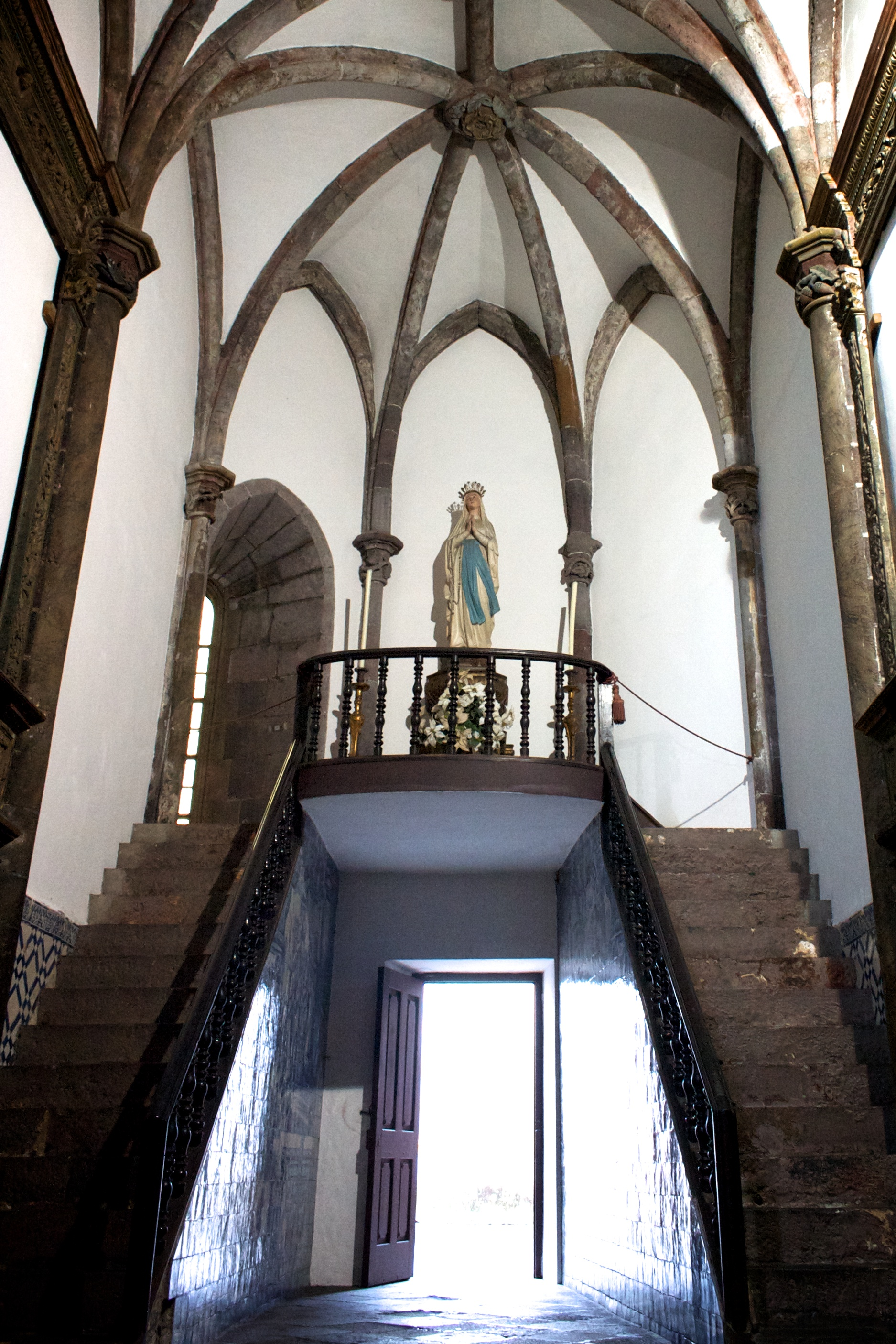
Apse chapel of the Cathedral of Funchal, Funchal, Madeira Island, Portugal.

An apse chapel, apsidal chapel, or chevet is a chapel in traditional Christian church architecture, which radiates tangentially from one of the bays or divisions of the apse. It is reached generally by a semicircular passageway, or ambulatory, exteriorly to the walls or piers of the apse.

== Features ==
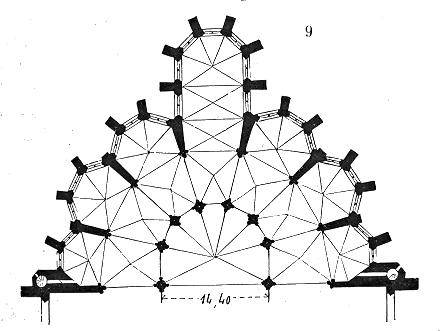
Plan of the chevet of Amiens Cathedral, with seven radiating chapels.

In plan, the normal type of the tangential chapel is semicircular; some, however, are pentagonal, and some composed of a small circle, serving as choir, and part of a large circle, as nave; some are oblong with eastern apses. In England, sometimes an ambulatory connects the north and south aisles of the choir and from the ambulatory projects an eastern chapel or chapels. The eastern chevet of Westminster Abbey, surrounded by five apsidal chapels, is the only complete example of this feature in England.

The common source of the ambulatory and radiating chapels seems to have been the church of St. Martin of Tours, where originally there was a choir of two bays, and an apse of five bays, surrounded by a single ambulatory and five radiating chapels. Altars, which had before cumbered the nave, could now be placed in the new radiating chapels of the ambulatory, which afforded the necessary access to them.

Each apsidal chapel could be treated as a sanctuary, to be entered only by the officiating, priest and his attendants, and the ambulatory served as the necessary nave for the worshippers. The usual number of these radiating chapels is three. Apse chapels are often found in the cathedrals of the Benedictine foundations, and occasionally in those of the Cluniac reform.

St. Martin of Tours, St. Savin, and Cluny have five choir chapels; Amiens, Beauvais Cologne, and Le Mans have seven apsidal chapels. No ambulatory with tangential chapels is older than about 900. The peri-apsidal plan of Westminster Abbey, commenced in 1050 by Edward the Confessor, anticipated Cluny by thirty-nine years, a plan which was reproduced at Gloucester in 1089 and at Norwich in 1096.

Radiating chapels are almost entirely a continental plan and most frequently found in French and Gothic structures. In England, the apse chapel is very rare, owing to the generally square termination of the presbytery. Traces of an early apsidal treatment are found in Canterbury Cathedral. In continental churches the central apse chapel was often the Lady-chapel, which in England was generally placed at the side.

== See also ==
- Apse
- Scarsella
- Westwork

== Bibliography ==
- Moore, Charles (1890). Development and character of Gothic architecture. London.
- Bloxam, Matthew Holbeche (1882). Principles of Gothic Ecclesiastical Architecture (11 ed.). London. ISBN 9781697526905.
- Bond, F. (1906). Gothic Architecture in England. London: B.T. Batsford.
