= Pazzi Chapel =

Chapel at Santa Croce, Florence

Coordinates: 43°46′4.82″N 11°15′46.76″E

- Cappella dei Pazzi
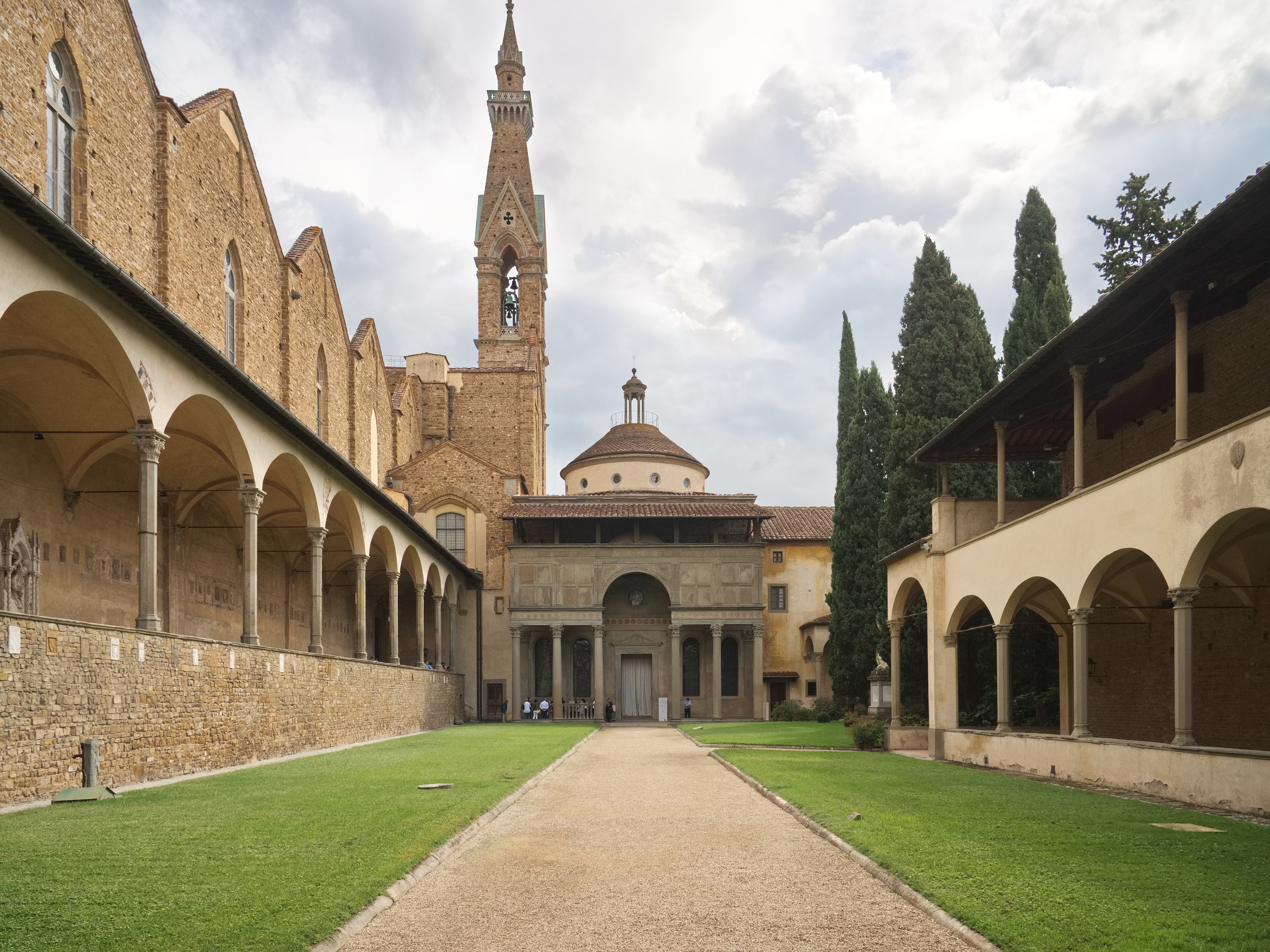
- Pazzi Chapel
- Location: Santa Croce, Florence
- Country: Italy
- Denomination: Roman Catholic

Architecture
- Architect: Filippo Brunelleschi
- Style: Renaissance
- Groundbreaking: 1429
- Completed: 1461

The Pazzi Chapel (Italian: Cappella dei Pazzi) is a chapel located in the "first cloister" on the southern flank of the Basilica di Santa Croce in Florence, Italy. Commonly credited to Filippo Brunelleschi, it is considered to be one of the masterpieces of Renaissance architecture.

== History ==
Though funds for the chapel were assembled in 1429 by Andrea Pazzi, head of the Pazzi family, whose wealth was second only to the Medici, construction did not begin until about 1442. The chapel was completed in 1478. The building is considered to be an Early Renaissance masterpiece.

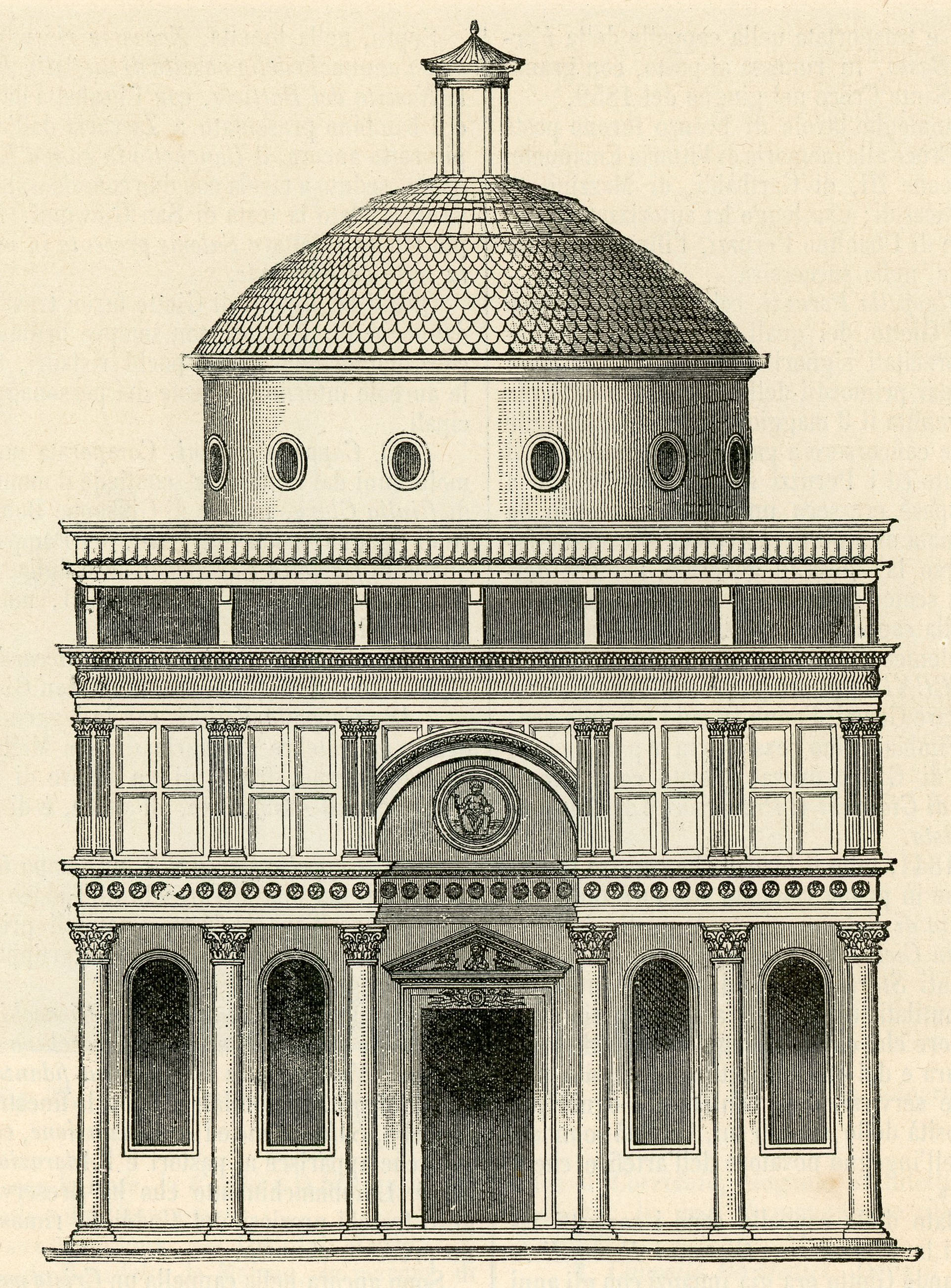
Front elevation (woodcut, 19th century)

Formerly considered a work of Filippo Brunelleschi (d. 1446), it is now thought that he was responsible for the plan, which is based on simple geometrical forms, the square and the circle, but not for the building's execution and detailing. The most common argument for crediting Brunelleschi is the chapel's clear similarity to the Old Sacristy of San Lorenzo; others argue that his style had developed in the twenty-year interim and that the Pazzi Chapel would represent a retrograde step. The first written mention of Brunelleschi as the architect was written by an anonymous author in the 1490s. Scholars now consider the chapel as possibly the work of Giuliano da Maiano or Michelozzo. A façade thought to have been begun by Brunelleschi, of which only the lower register can be seen, was partially obscured by the addition of a porch. The main inspiration for this piece was the Dominican monastery of Santa Maria Novella, also located in Florence.

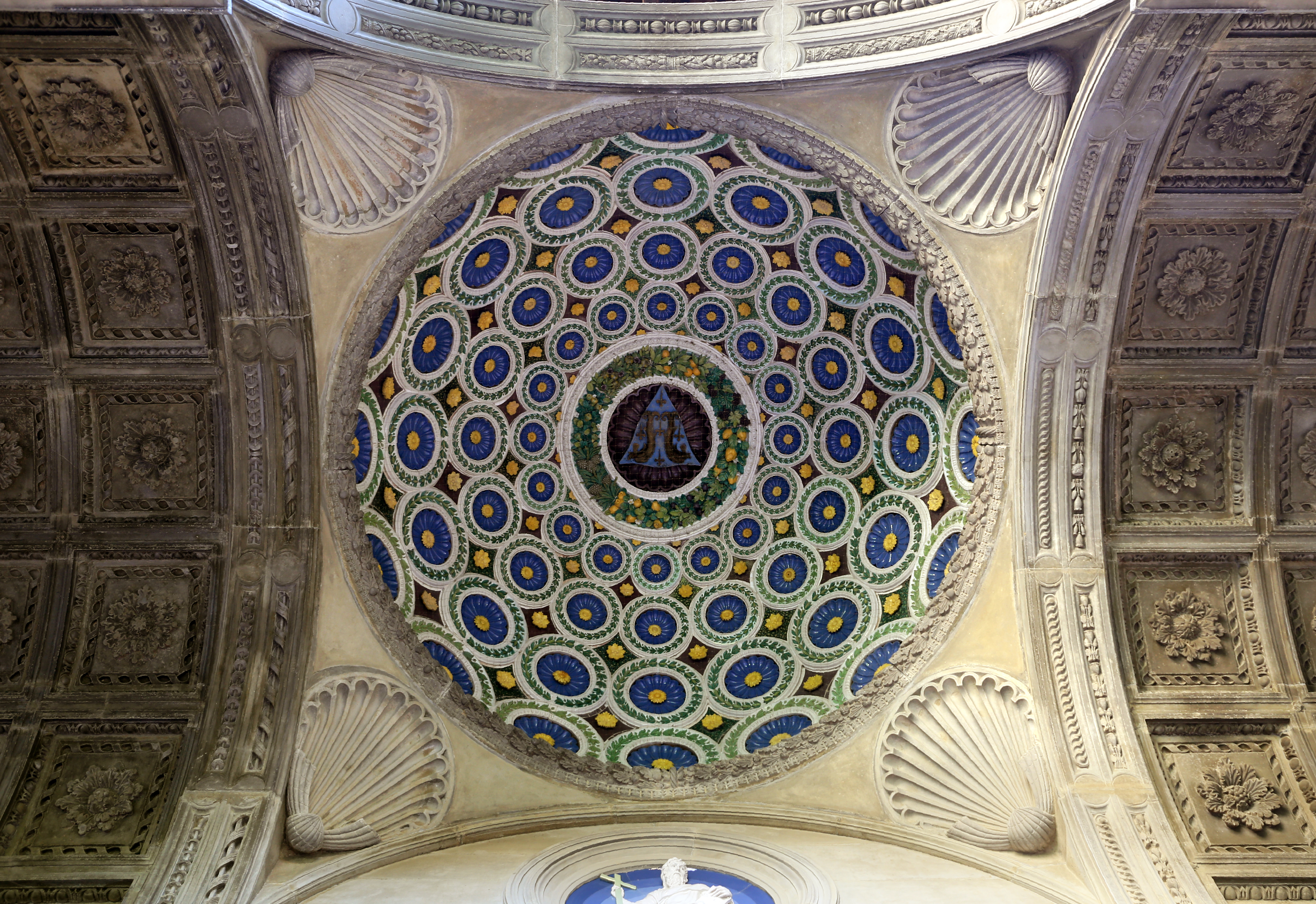
Dome and vaults of the portico

The main purpose of the building was the cathedral chapter house (meeting room for the governing chapter) and use as a classroom for the teaching of monks and other religious purposes. There was also a chapel behind the altar where the commissioning family had the right to bury its dead. The Pazzi's ulterior motive in building the chapel was probably to make their mark on the city of Florence and to emphasize their wealth and power. The fact that the city was at war with a neighboring city at the time and still acquired the funds to build this chapel showed the importance it had to the Pazzi family and the people of Florence.

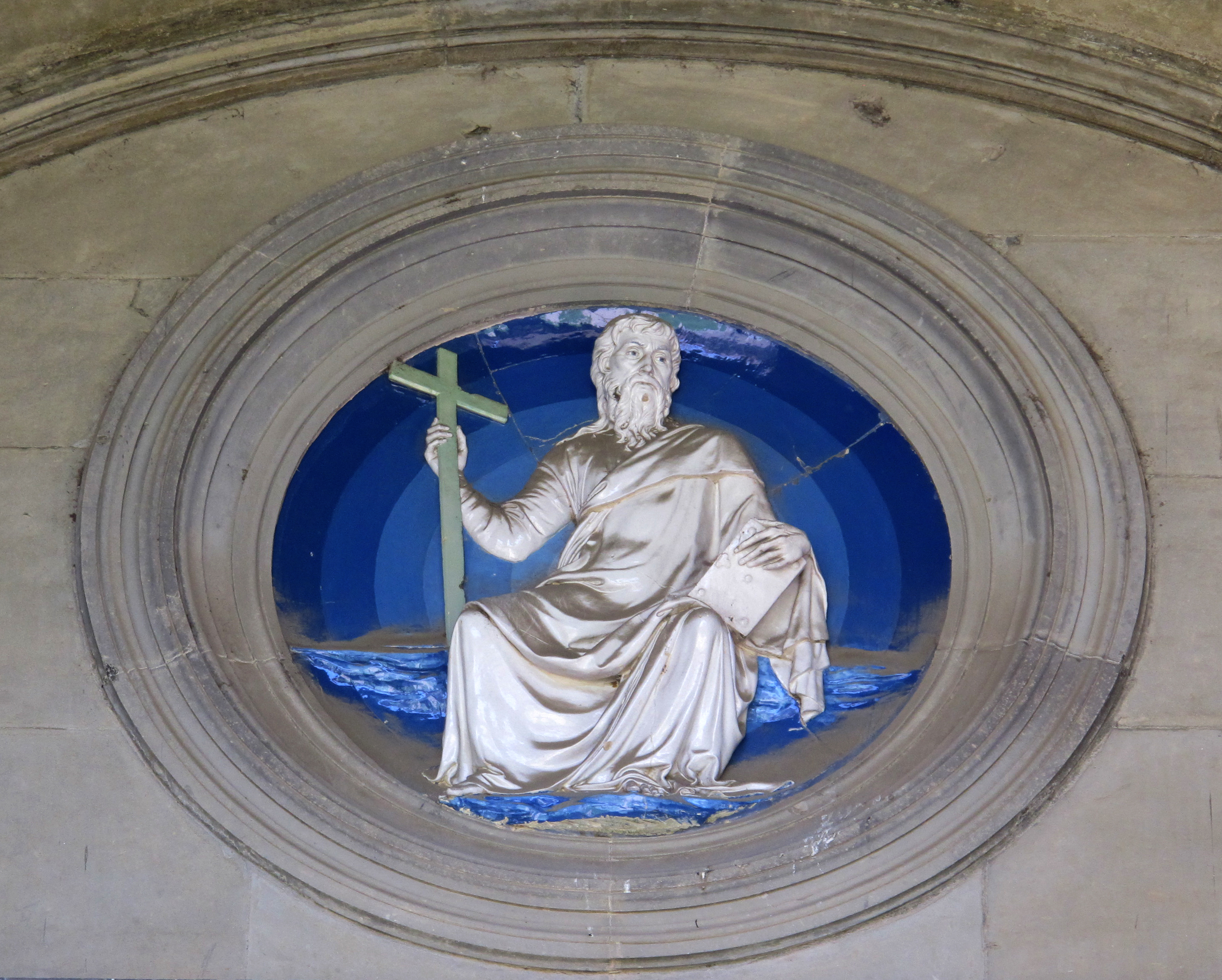
St Andrew, glazed terracotta roundel in the lunette above the door

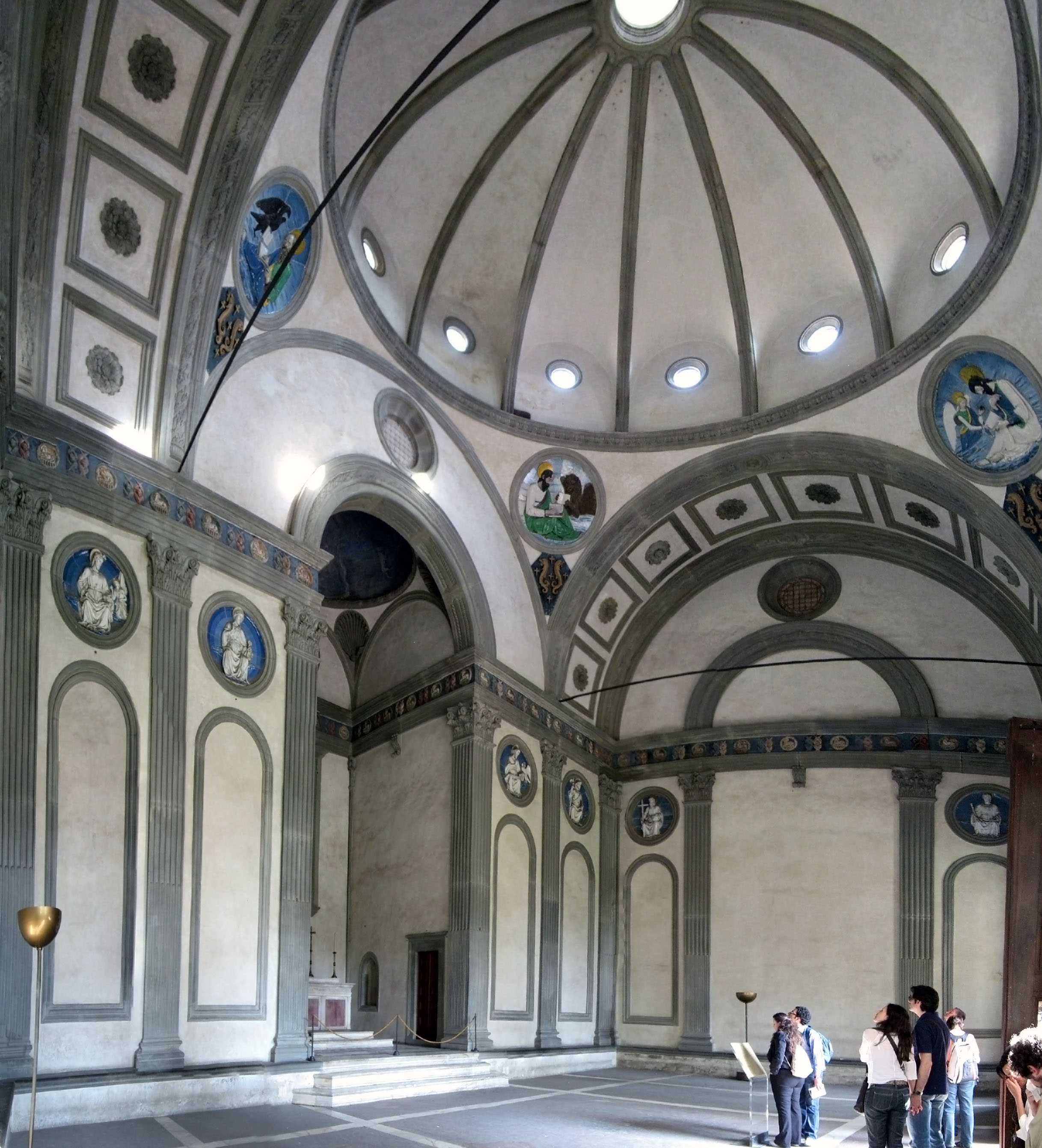
Interior of the Pazzi Chapel

The size of the chapel was predetermined by existing walls, creating an unusual situation, however, where the space was not square as in the Old Sacristy, which was the model for this building, but rectangular and transept-like and thus in contradistinction to the square, axially placed altar. Despite this, and its complex history, the building gives us insight into the ambitions of Renaissance architects in their struggle to bring coherence to the architectural language of columns, pilasters, arches and vaults. Between the pilasters in the transept there are tall, blank, round headed panels and, above them, roundels, common Renaissance decorative motifs. The architecture of the interior is articulated by the use of pietra serena, a dark, high quality, fine grained sandstone, though in fact the load-bearing structure of the building is its masonry, i.e. it is the walls that support the arches and domes, not the pilasters which are decorative rather than structural.

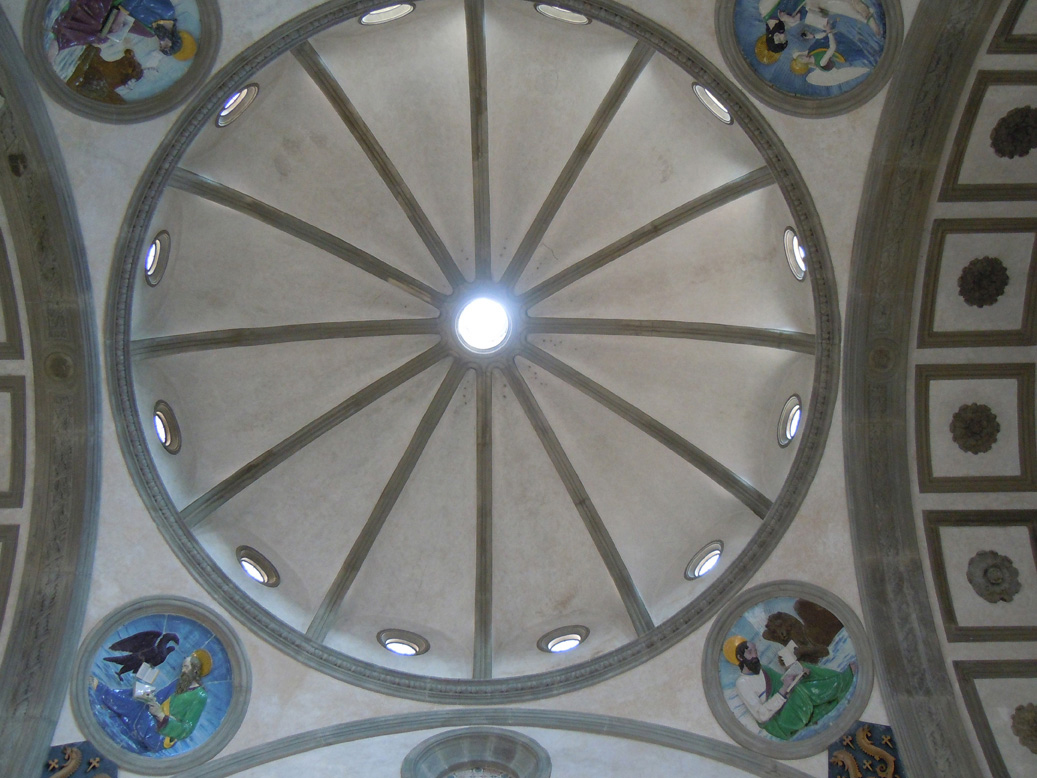
Pazzi Chapel ceiling

The tondi of the seated Apostles are by Luca della Robbia, who also did the terracotta decorations in the cupola of the porch. The glazed terracotta roundels of the Four Evangelists inside the chapel derive from similar tondos by Donatello in the Old Sacristy of San Lorenzo, Florence, with the attribute of each Evangelist holding open a book that the saint appears to be copying, an unusual iconography.

Like the Sagrestia Vecchia in Florence, the small dome over the altar of Pazzi Chapel has a painting of star constellations made to accurately depict a particular date. The quality of the painting and the astronomical data of the time has limited its accuracy, but the closest match appears to be of July 6, 1439, the date of the papal bull Laetentur caeli et exultetterra that decreed reunification of the Western and Eastern churches at the Council of Florence.

== See also ==
- Late medieval domes
- Italian Renaissance domes
- Sagrestia Vecchia
- Symbolism of domes
