= Pietra serena =

Sandstone used in Florecian Renaissance architecture

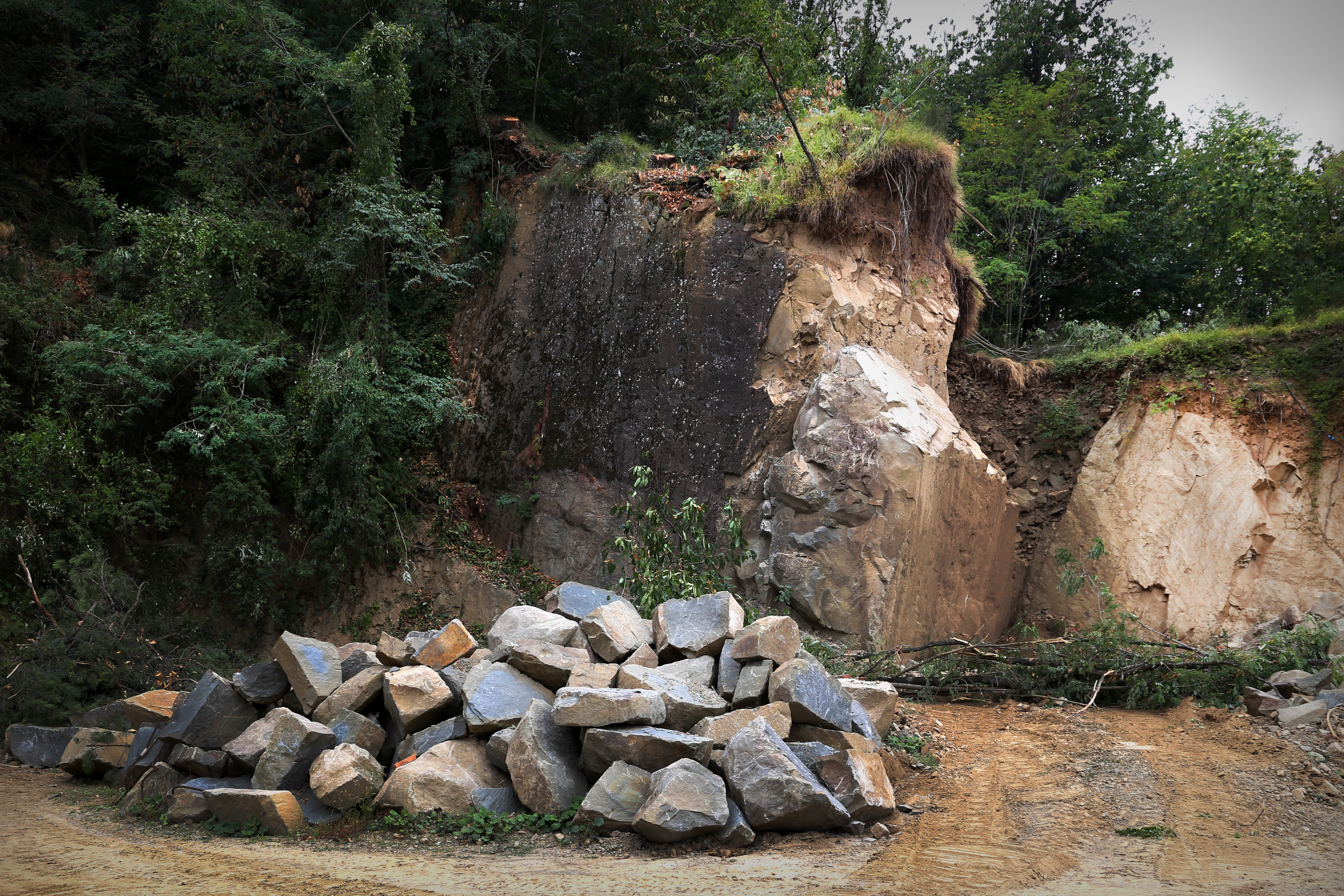
Pietra serena boulders quarried in cava Nardini, Vellano, Tuscany, Italy

Pietra serena is a blue-gray sandstone used extensively in Renaissance Florence for architectural details. It is also known as Macigno stone. The material obtained at Fiesole is considered the best and is also quarried at Arezzo, Cortona, and Volterra, although it is no longer being actively mined and has been placed under conservation status due to depleting resources.

Examples of its use in Florence include the interior pilasters, entablatures, and other decorative elements of Brunelleschi's Pazzi Chapel and Michelangelo's Medici Chapel. The most well-known of its quarries in the Florentine area is the Trassinaia quarry.

== History ==
Pietra serena was first largely discovered by the Etruscans in the Archaic period who occupied the medieval Italian area of Fiesole. It was used in the construction of much notable Italian architecture during the "Golden Age of Rome", including that of artists such as Michelangelo, Donatello, Brunelleschi, and Vasari. It was also used in building structures such as amphitheatres, pillars and sculptures, "to enhance the power of the ruling dynasty". The use of pietra serena by such well-known Italian figures in the art world then promoted it to a wider market, and it became a more popular material for aesthetic and architectural purposes, and also amassed "social and economic importance".

The Etruscans contributed to the use and popularity of pietra serena in architecture, and much of this occurred before a more contemporary Italy came to fruition. Before this ruling dynasty within Rome had significant access to the use of pietra serena for ornamental and aesthetic purposes, the Etruscans were said to "for a while [have] eclipsed Rome", and this was in part due to their success in using pietra serena, as well as the fact that they were said to develop independently from the empire and society of Rome in pre-Renaissance times. Rome therefore "benefitted from Etruscan contact: architectural innovation, religious practices, customs including the triumph and the toga, and even some of Rome's kings are thought to have come from Etruria", and pietra serena became more widespread in its fame and desirability as a building material due to this.

Although both pietra serena and its cousin pietraforte were favoured in the use of both aesthetic and civil construction in Renaissance Italy, pietra serena was considered to be more workable and thus more usable as a sandstone. Despite pietraforte being favoured as a building material within Florence, pietra serena was principally used in the construction of columns, road pavings, design features within households and the aesthetic aspects of buildings, and has contributed to the notoriety of Florence as a prominent location for architectural innovation during the Renaissance.

== Quarries ==
Pietra serena was very popular in Italian Renaissance architecture, and because of this the quarries where the stone was found were exploited. Numerous quarries surrounding the Florentine region of Italy have been found both under and above ground, and each quarry was distinct in the variety of pietra serena formed there due to the differing style of rock formation. Such differences were caused by a number of things, including tectonic plate shifts and water run-off, as "the city of Florence is located in the [south-east] corner of the Firenze-Prato-Pistoia basin, one of the tectonic basins that evolved during the Neogene on the Tyrrenian side of the Apennines thrust and fold belt".

The quarries are located in the city of Florence itself, making it inexpensive and easily accessible to mine for pietra serena during the height of its extraction in the Renaissance period. More quarries were expanded outside of the city in the 15th century due to the increasing demand for pietra serena.

The main pietra serena quarries of the Florentine region included:

- Gonfolina
- Tavarnuzze
- Bolognese
- Faentina
- Bonciani-Fiesole
- Fossato-Trassinaia
- Settignano
- Greve

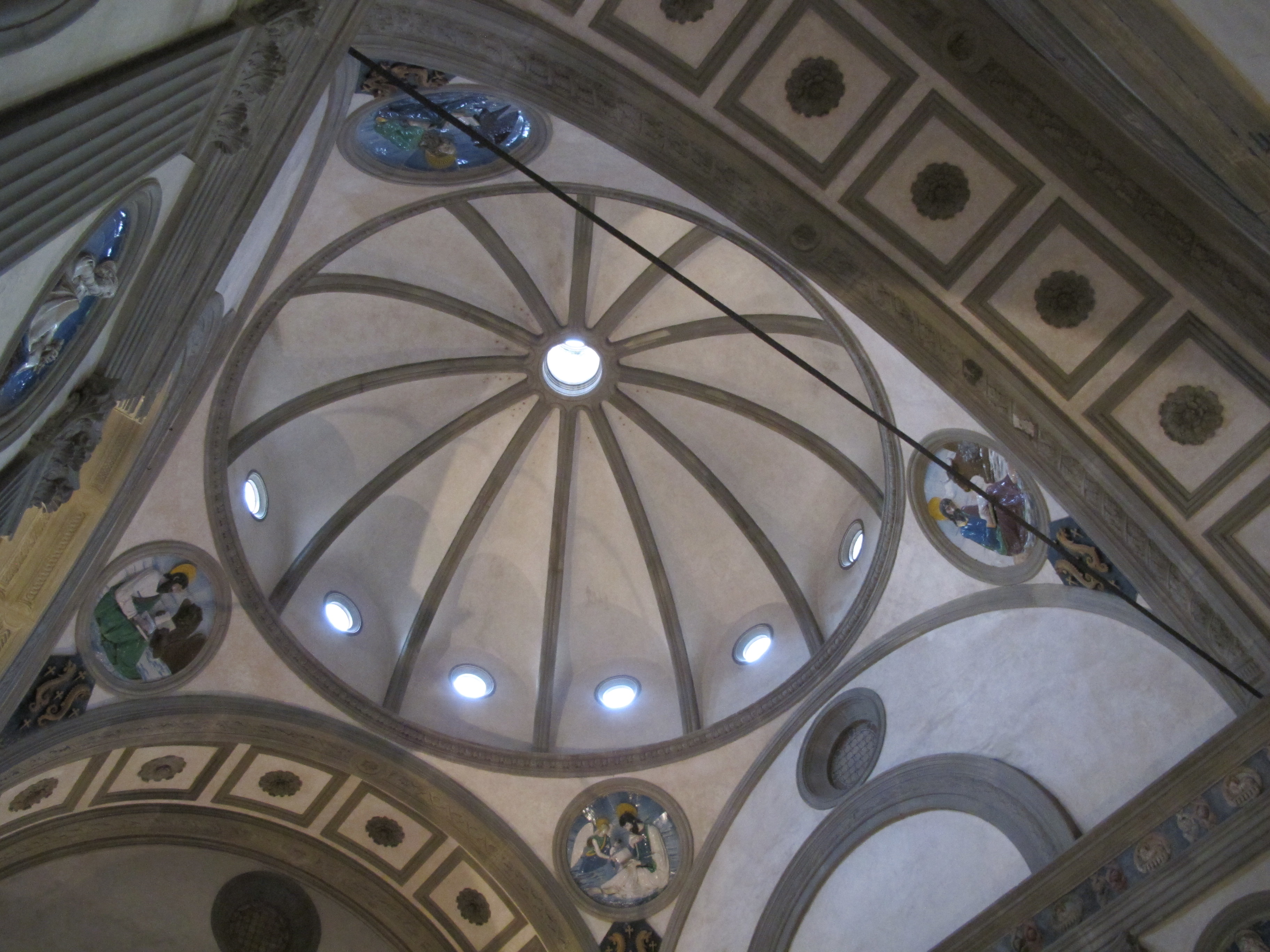
Pazzi Chapel in Florence, Italy

Several quarries were also listed as "Banned Quarries". This meant that authorisation was required to visit and extract the rock due to faster-depleting resources and the level of quality of the sandstone.

The construction of the pietra serena quarries also involved the use of pillar formation, as many used "the chamber-and-pillar mining system" by the eighteenth century. Quarries, particularly those located underground, were often hollowed-out spaces with roofs held up by pillars. These pillars were created during the extraction process as miners dug deeper into the quarries so as to prevent roof collapse: "at the ceiling quarriers left about 60cm of the best-rated quarried bed in order to ensure roof bearing capacity".

Trassinaia was the main quarry used in the construction of Brunelleschi's Pazzi Chapel.

In 2002, Apple Inc. started using pietra serena from the Casone quarry for wide use in the flooring of its Apple Stores after co-founder Steve Jobs had earlier admired the sidewalks on a trip to Florence.

== Sub-types ==
Several subcategories of the pietra serena rock exist. The differences in rock formation and extraction process in each quarry cause small differences in the chemical and mineral makeup of pietra serena and create these sub-types. A study of the quarries in the Florentine area found that "In spite of almost uniform features, various beds have different operating performances due to the small distinction in the percentage of calcite and clay, as well as in the grain structure". This differentiation between the operation qualities of various pietra serena sub-types also influenced Michelangelo and Brunelleschi in their work and their selection of sandstones to use.

These sub-types are based on the different quarries they were found in and include:

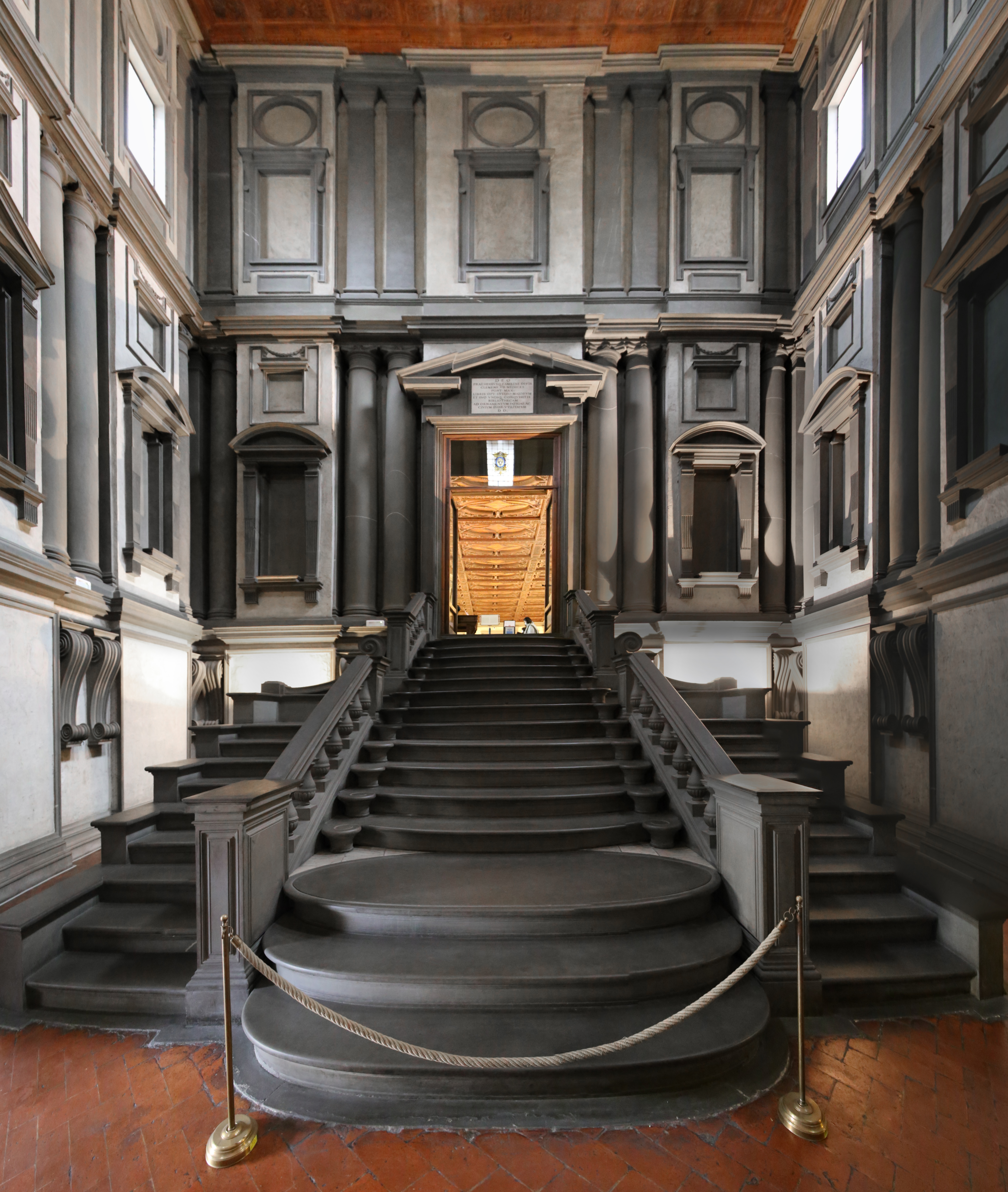
Staircase designed by Michelangelo at the Laurentian Library, Florence, Italy

- Pietra del fossato, a "fine-grained variety of pietra serena from the Mensola valley". It was used by Michelangelo in his creation of the Laurentian Library.
- Pietra serena di firenzuola, which shares macroscopic similarities to pietra serena and is used mainly for the restoration of existing architecture. This variety is located in the Marnoso Arenacea Formation in the north east of Florence.
- Sereno ordinario, which has a fine grain but is not uniform in size.
- Sereno gentile, which unlike sereno ordinario had a uniformly-sized fine grain and a higher percentage of calcitic cement in its composition. This variety was mainly used in sculpting due to its more polished appearance.

These sub-types were categorised based on their differences in durability, porosity, chemical makeup, as well as "grain size, grain size distribution and the nature and quantity of the calcitic cement". Specific identifications have been attached to each sub-type and the quarry they hail from according to the differences in their make-up, and "In the Fiesole area, these discontinuities have traditional denominations: the bedding is known as falda, while the joint sets are referred to as mozzatura... and recisa."

The most notable relationship between these different mineral qualities was between calcitic cement levels and durability. It has been found that pietra serena sub-types with levels of calcitic cement up to 15% are able to better withstand weathering and have increased durability compared to pietra serena types with calcitic cement levels of between five and seven percent. The different varieties of pietra serena are referred to as "different grades", of which the best is considered sereno gentile for its malleability and durability.

== Physical traits ==
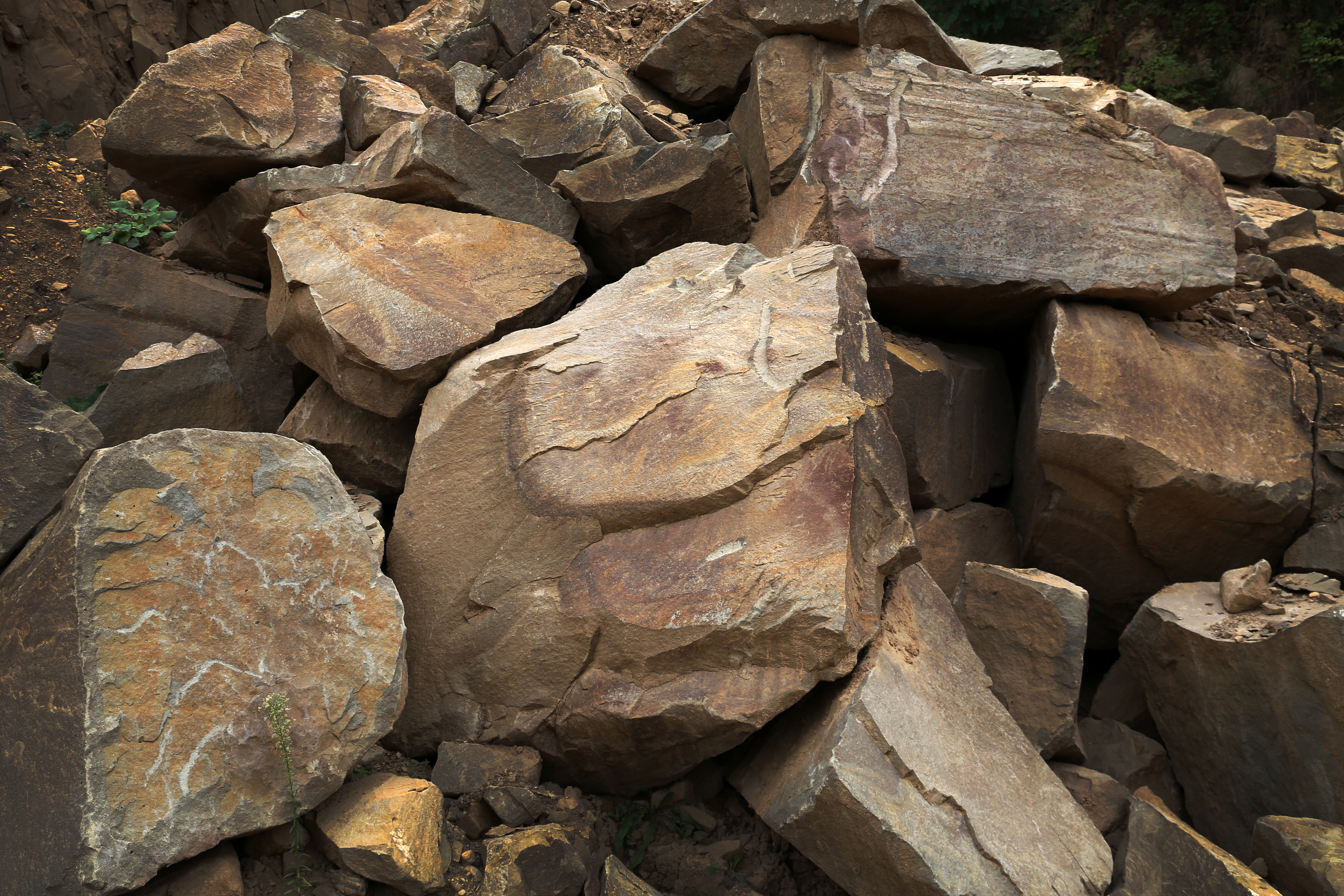
Mined pietra serena rock at a quarry in Vellano

Pietra serena is mined and extracted from quarries as a blue-grey colour, and has been described by some as "cerulean". After extraction from underground, the clay matrix of the stone undergoes oxidisation and gives the material a more red-brown colour, although it partially maintains its blue tone. The stone as a building material has been described as smooth and easily workable, and this is due to its lower level of durability.

== Conservation ==
As of the twenty-first century, many of the quarries are inaccessible or difficult to locate due to their lack of use, which subsequently allowed for overgrowth and thus concealment. Concerns for depleting natural resources within the quarries led to them being left alone and for conservation efforts to increase in the twentieth century, mainly through reforestation. Much effort has been put into reviving and maintaining these conservation efforts to provide sustainability to the environment, and the Trassinaia quarry in particular has benefited from these protection and concealment tactics: "the Trassinaia quarry place is widely invaded by vegetation and quite difficult to reach". This lack of usage or extraction of the quarries was due to the unsustainable nature of pietra serena as a sandstone, and many architects have turned to other aforementioned varieties of pietra serena or to sandstones with similar visual qualities in efforts to conserve the remaining sources of pietra serena.

Another form of conservation effort has involved the use of pietra serena sludge or slurry rather than the use of the rock itself. This allows the waste products of quarry extraction processes to be recycled into construction rather than remaining waste products, and thus allows a more sustainable usage of the rock. A study of the potential for alkaline waste materials and clay as beneficial for construction has found that "using these waste materials as construction materials appears to be a viable solution to the problem of waste accumulation and to generate cost reduction, while reducing the extraction of raw materials and preserving natural resources". The sludge must be heat-treated adequately to create a workable substance for use in construction and architecture, and studies have hypothesised that if this is achieved, "the sludge could be used as a secondary raw material, thus reducing landfilling and excavation of primary materials".
