= Apse =

Semicircular recess covered with a hemispherical vault or semi-dome

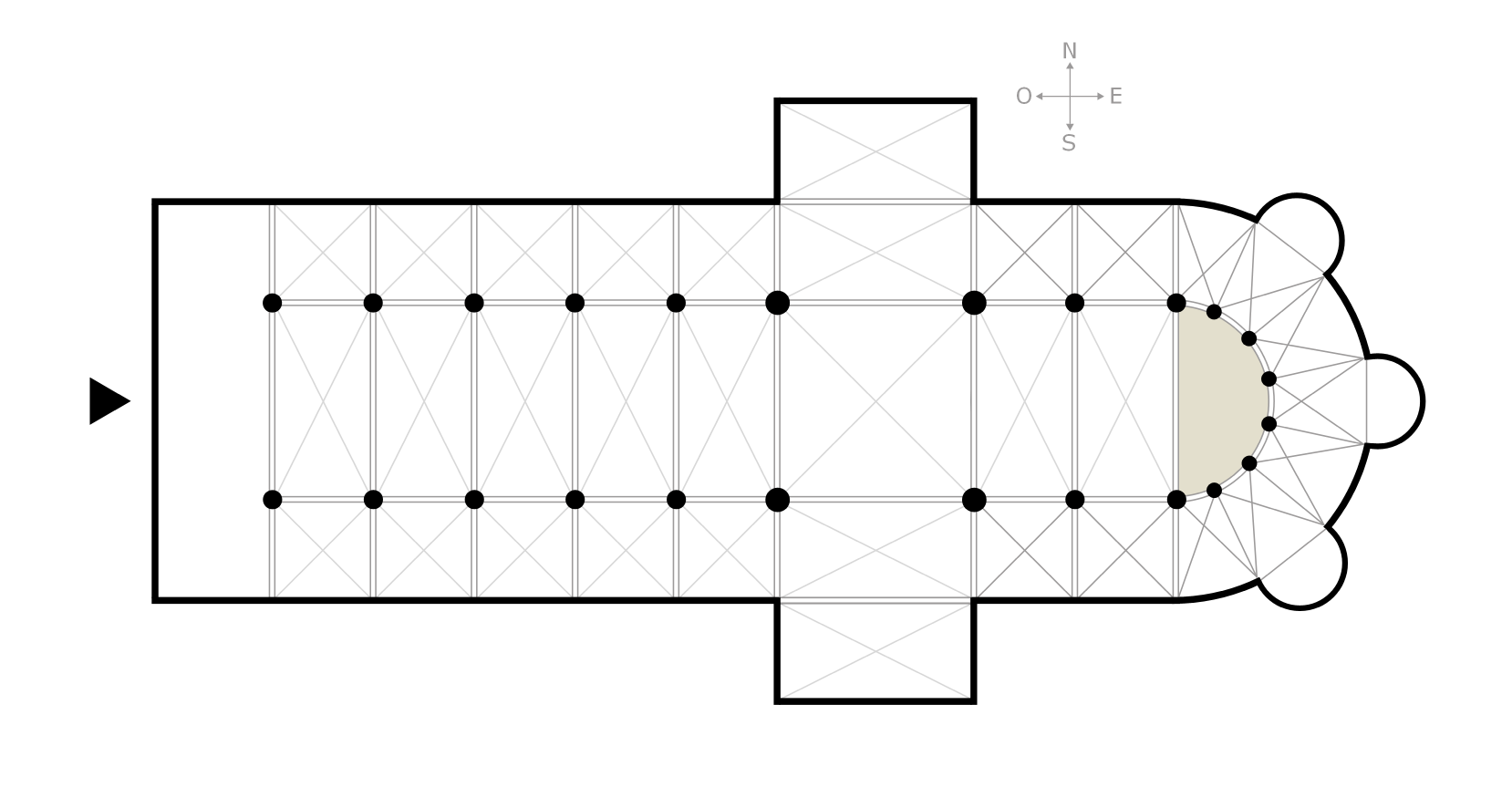
Typical floor plan of a cathedral, with the apse shaded

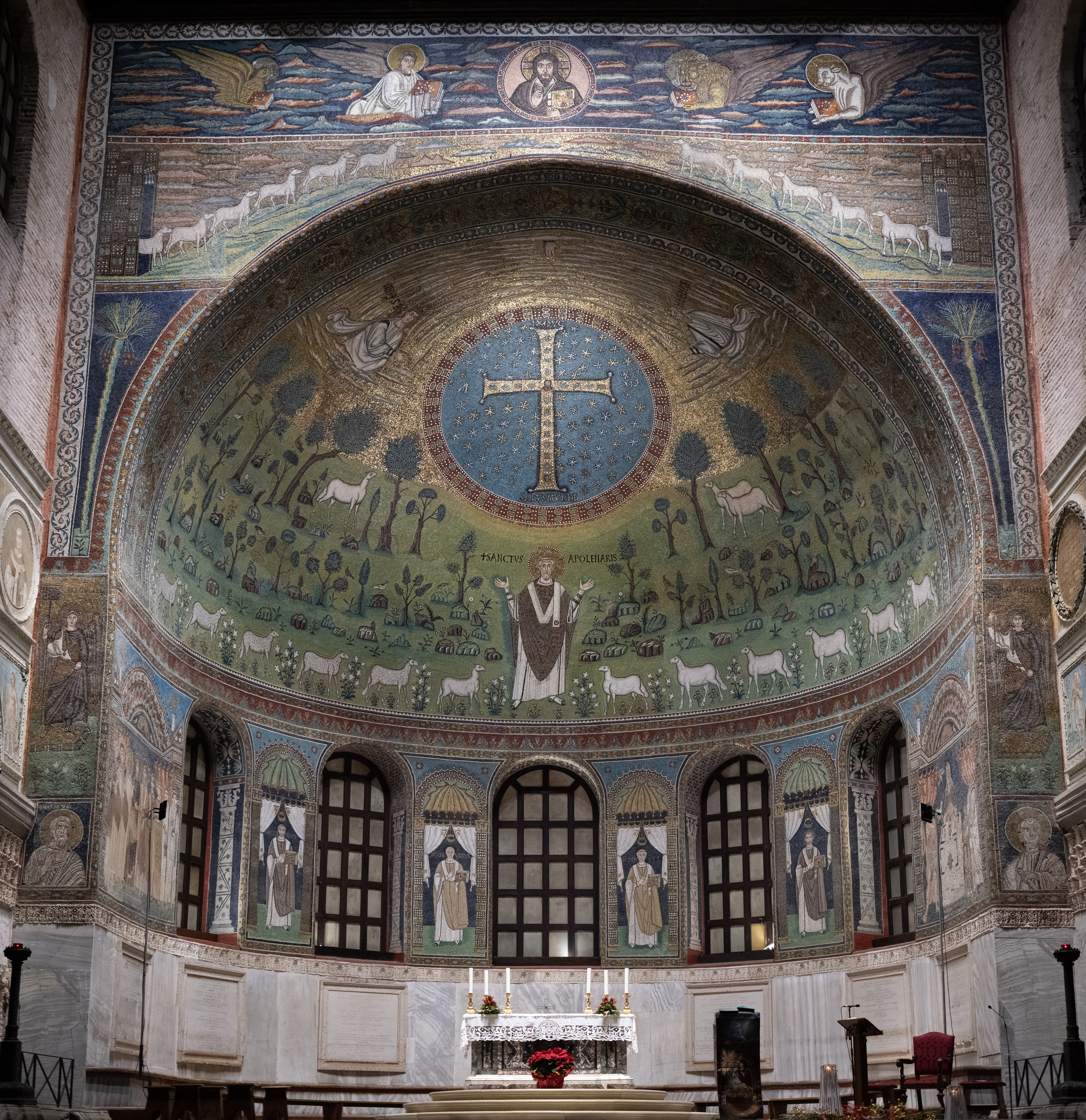
Typical early Christian Byzantine apse with a hemispherical semi-dome in the Basilica of Sant'Apollinare, Classe, Italy

In architecture, an apse (pl.: apses; from Latin absis, 'arch, vault'; from Ancient Greek ἀψίς, apsis, 'arch'; sometimes written apsis; pl.: apsides) is a semicircular recess covered with a hemispherical vault or semi-dome, also known as an exedra. In Byzantine, Romanesque, and Gothic Christian church (including cathedral and abbey) architecture, the term is applied to a semi-circular or polygonal termination of the main building at the liturgical east end (where the altar is), regardless of the shape of the roof, which may be flat, sloping, domed, or hemispherical. Smaller apses are found elsewhere, especially in shrines.

== Definition ==
An apse is a semicircular recess, often covered with a hemispherical vault. Commonly, the apse of a church, cathedral or basilica is the semicircular or polygonal termination to the choir or sanctuary, or sometimes at the end of an aisle.

Smaller apses are sometimes built in other parts of the church, especially for reliquaries or shrines of saints.

== History ==
The domed apse became a standard part of the church plan in the early Christian era.

== Related features ==
In the Eastern Orthodox Church tradition, the south apse is known as the diaconicon and the north apse as the prothesis. Various ecclesiastical features of which the apse may form part are drawn together here.

=== Chancel ===
The chancel (or sanctuary), directly to the east beyond the choir, contains the high altar, where there is one (compare communion table). This area is reserved for the clergy, and was therefore formerly called the "presbytery", from Greek presbuteros, "elder", or in older and Catholic usage "priest".

=== Chevet-apse chapels ===
Semi-circular choirs, first developed in the East, which came into use in France in 470. By the onset of the 13th century, they had been augmented with radiating apse chapels outside the choir aisle, the entire structure of apse, choir and radiating chapels coming to be known as the chevet (French, "headpiece").

== Gallery ==
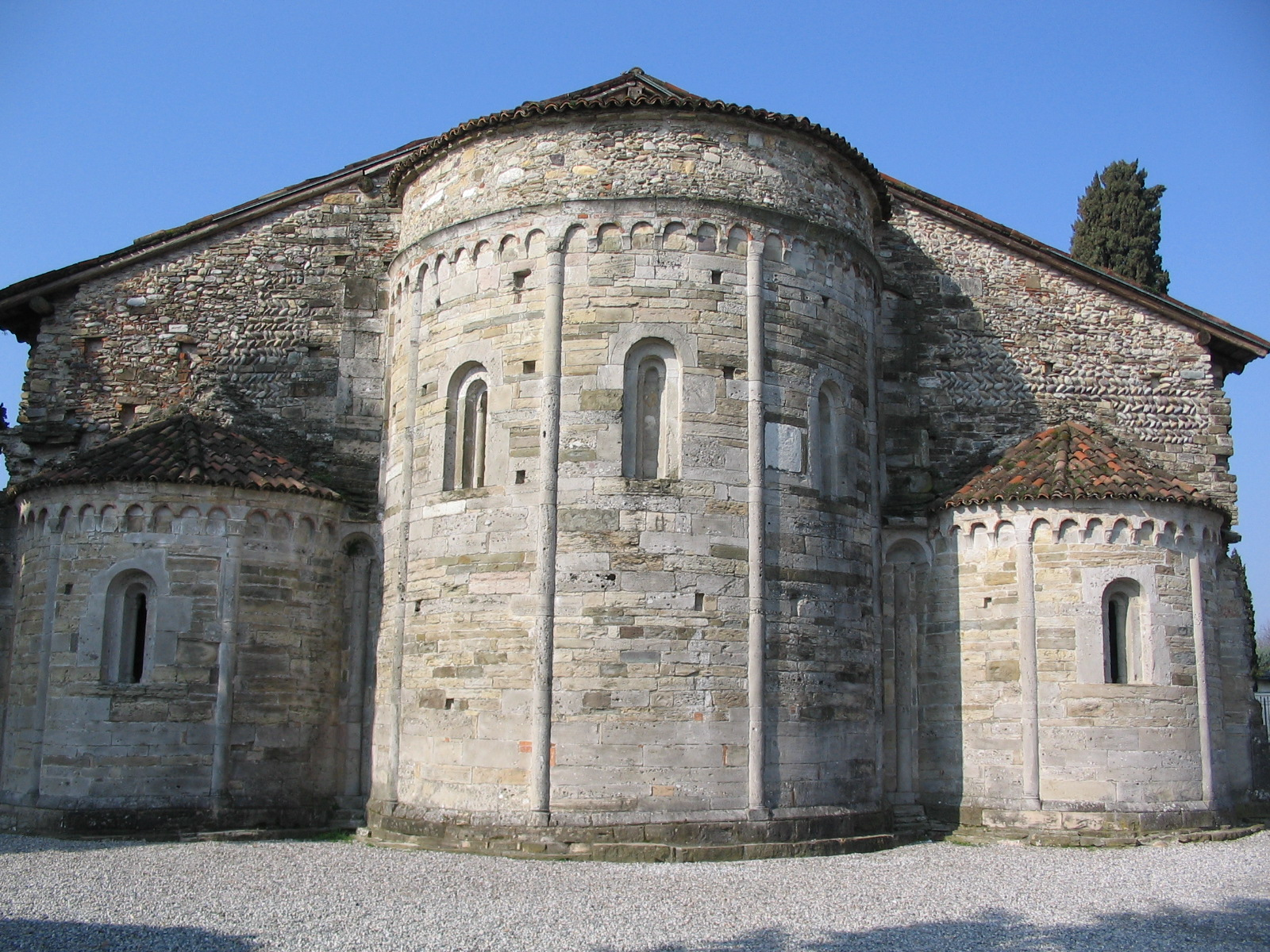
Triple apse of Basilica di Santa Giulia, northern Italy

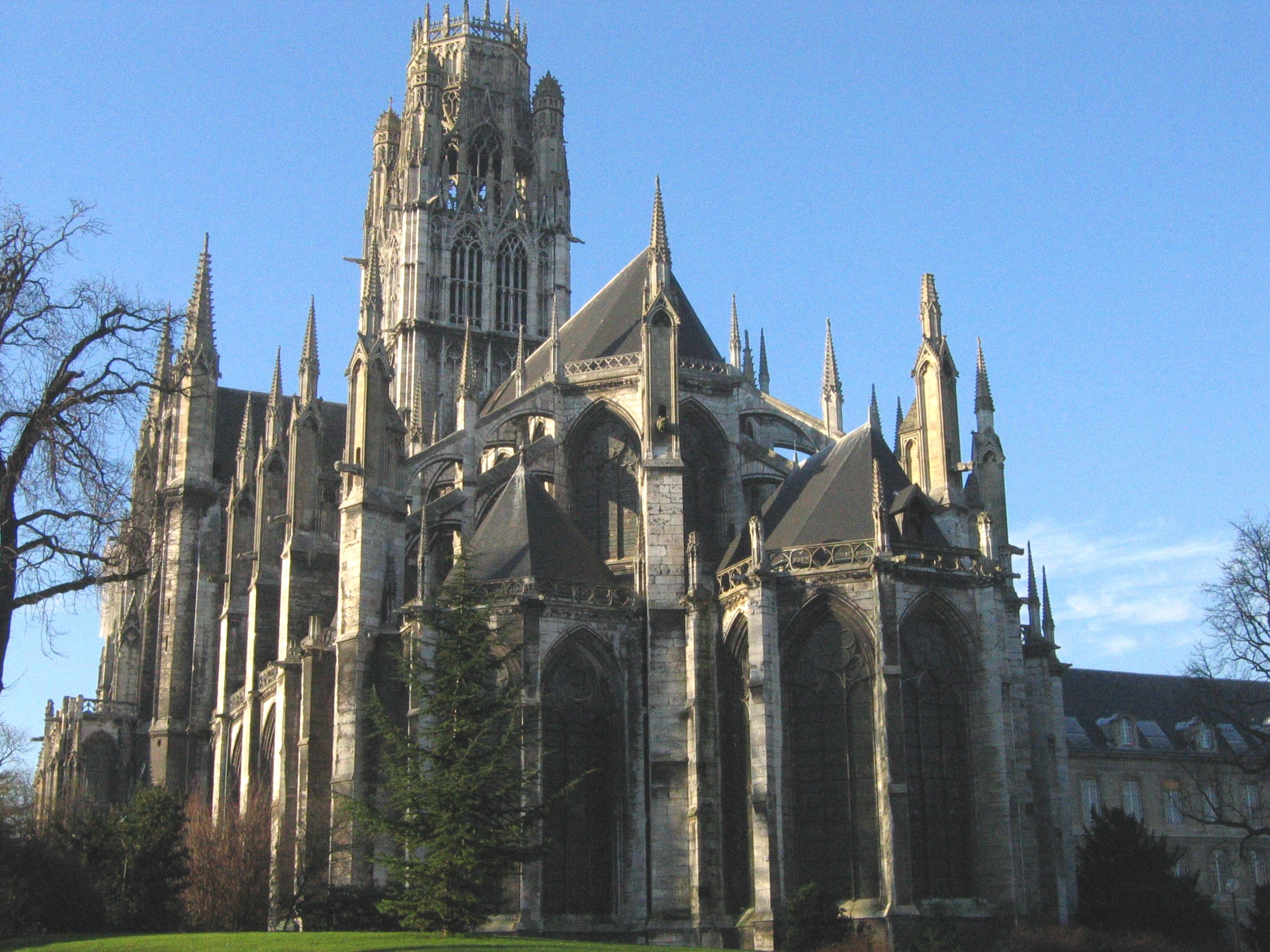
East end of the abbey church of Saint-Ouen, showing the chevet, Rouen, Seine-Maritime, France

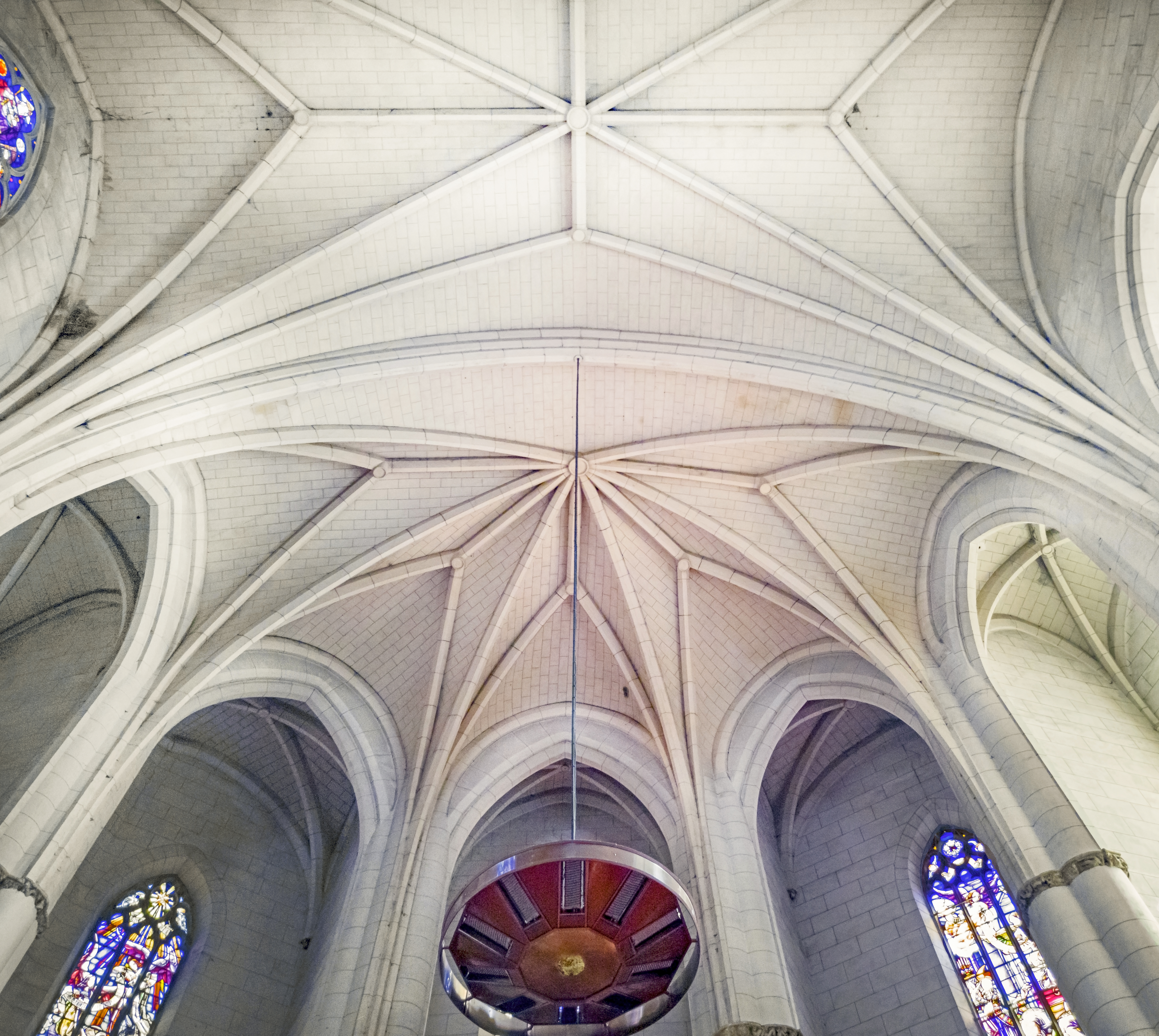
A chevet apse vault, Toulouse, France

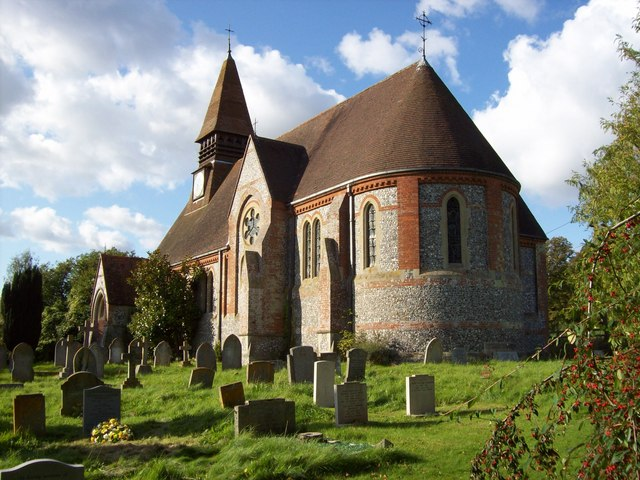
Apsed chancel of St Mary's Church, West Dean, Wiltshire, England

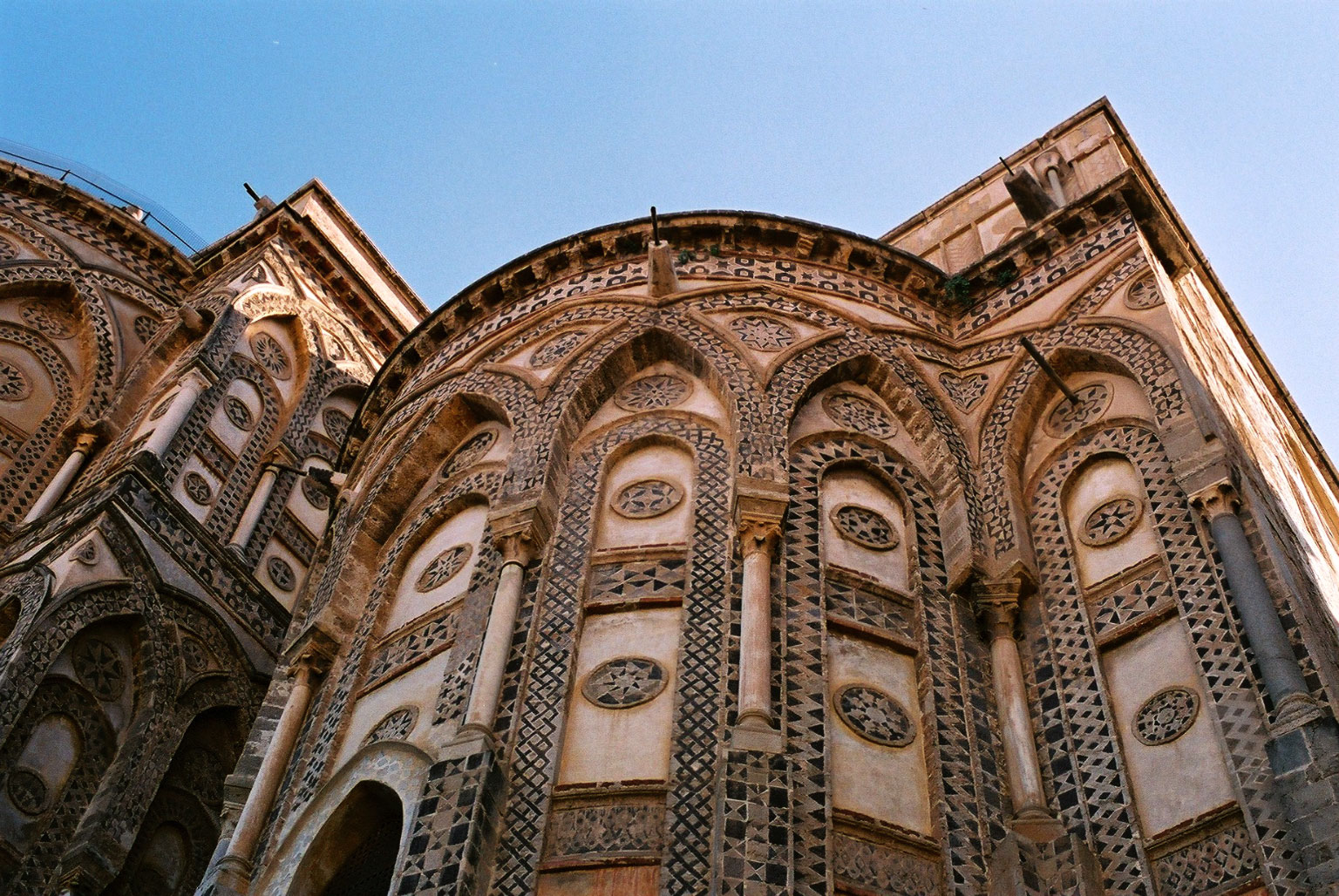
The decorated apse of the Cathedral of Monreale, Sicily

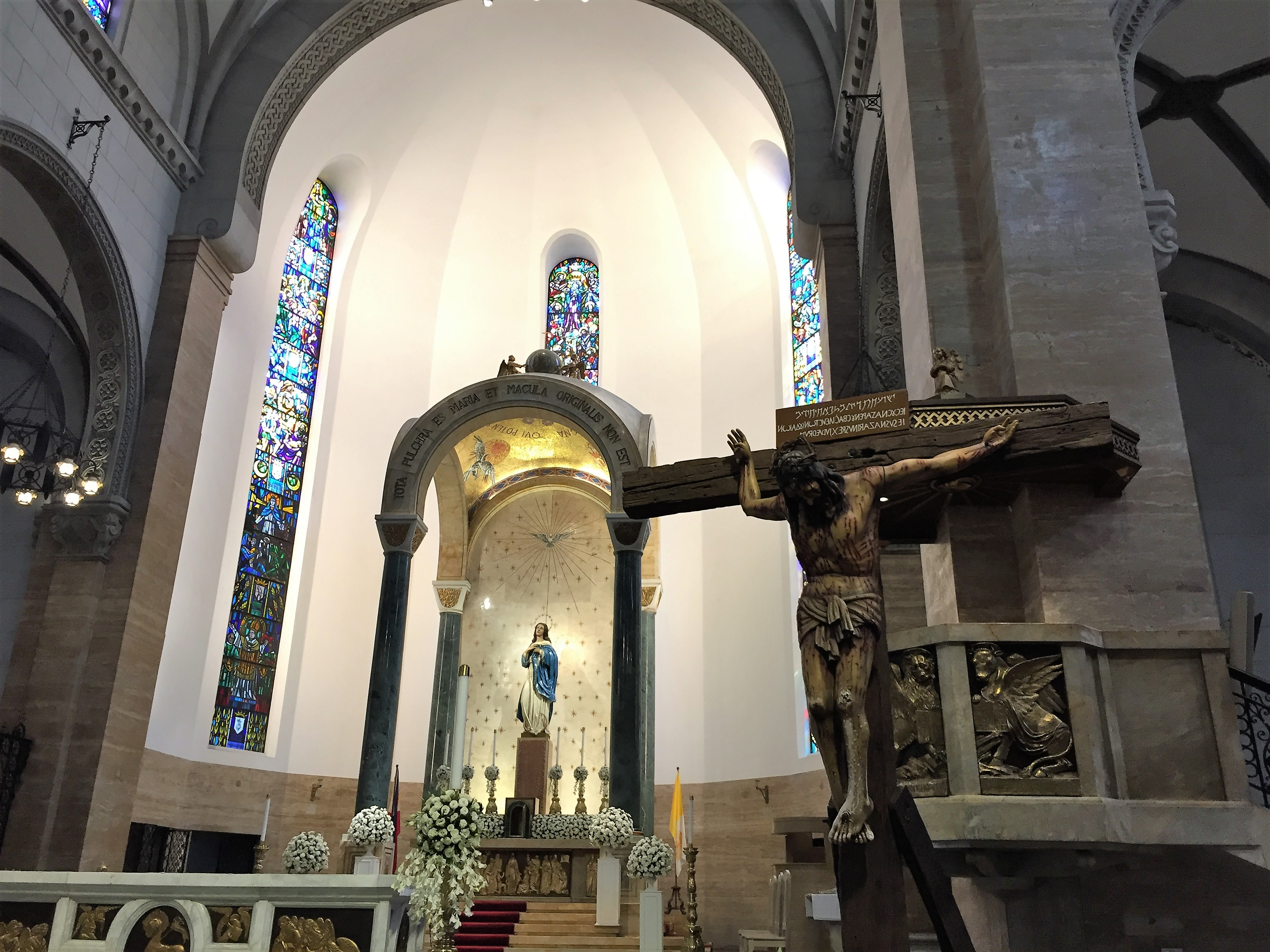
The apse of Manila Cathedral, Philippines

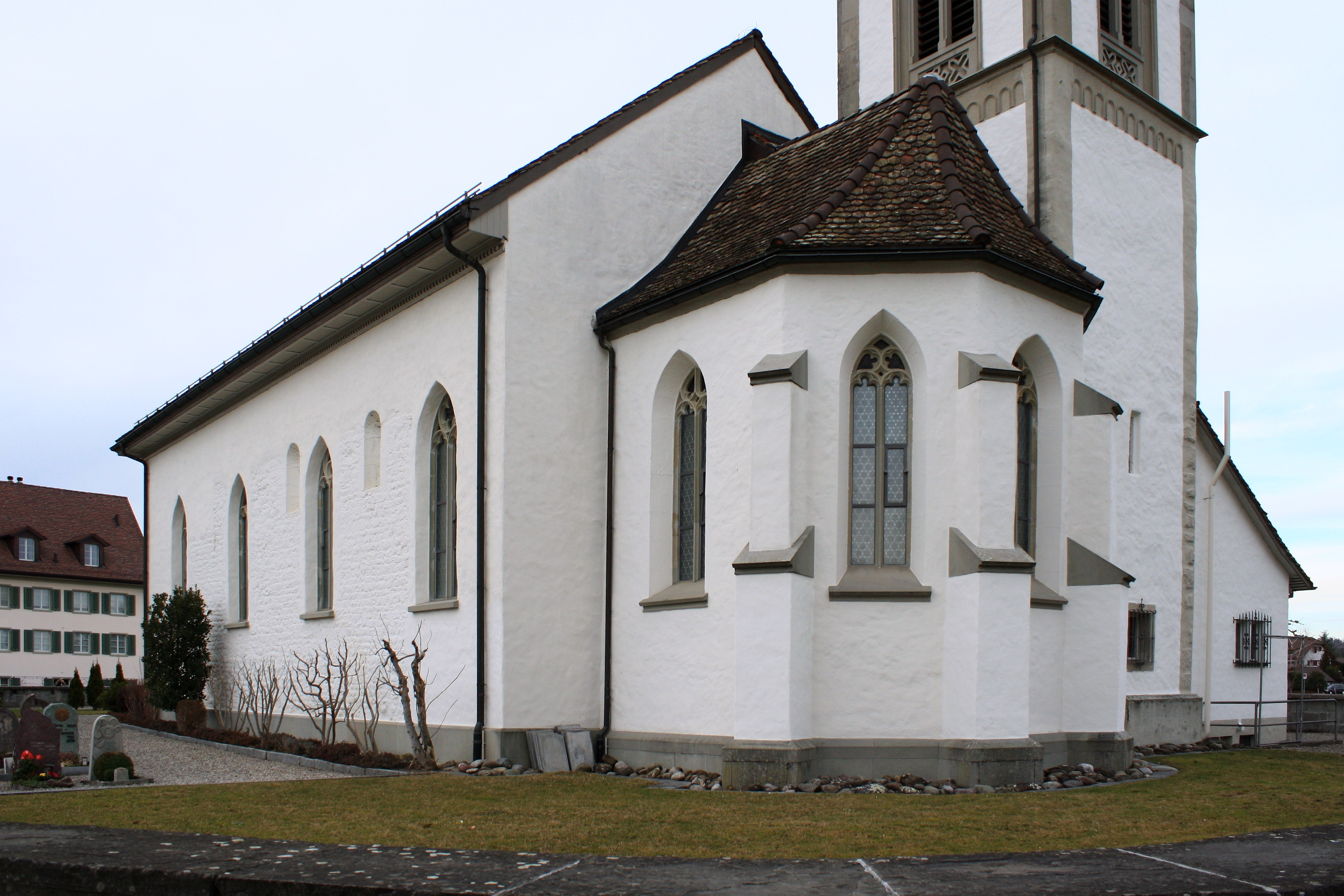
The apse of St. Martin church in Busskirch, community Jona, Switzerland

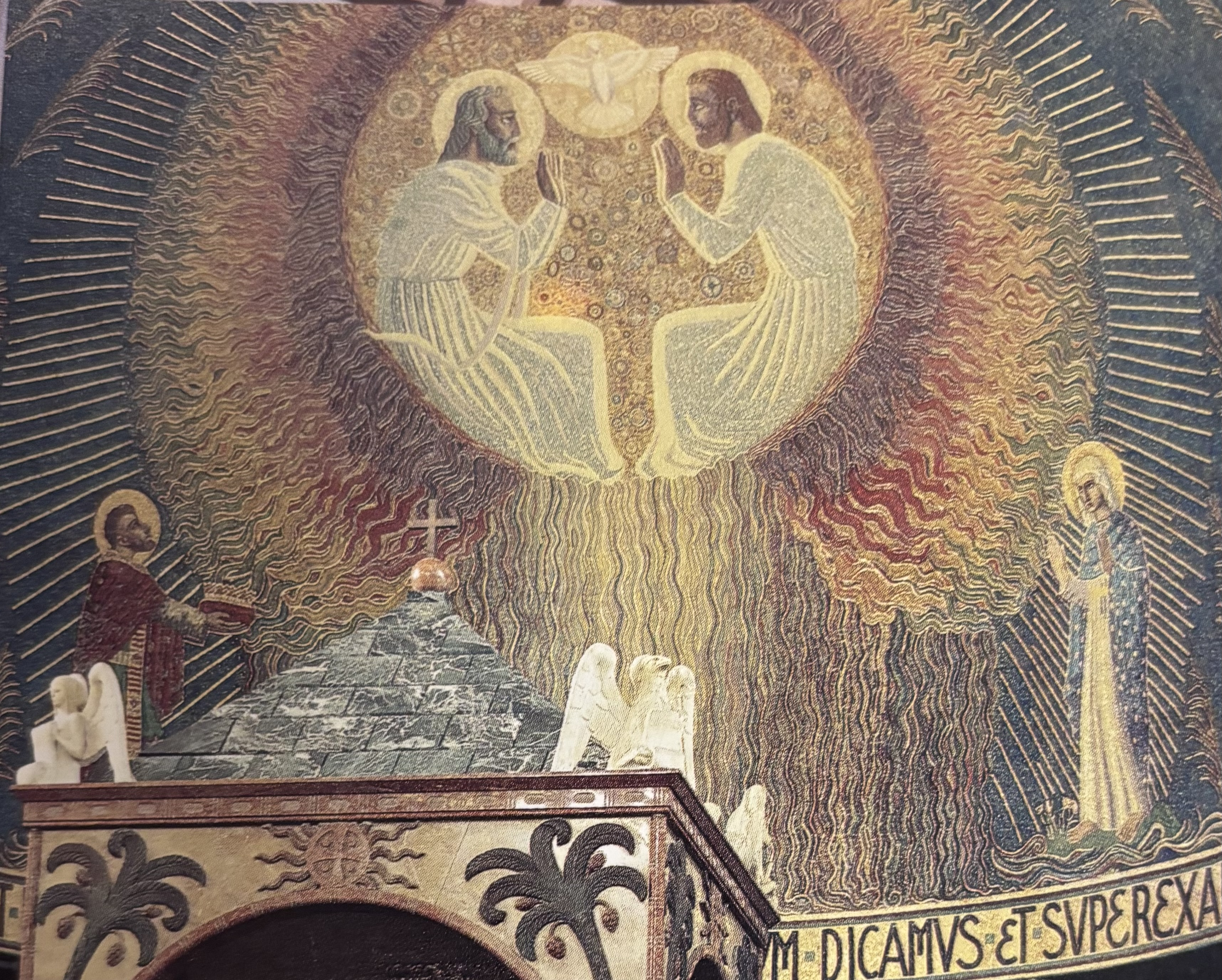
The apse of the Church of St. Edward, Busto Arsizio

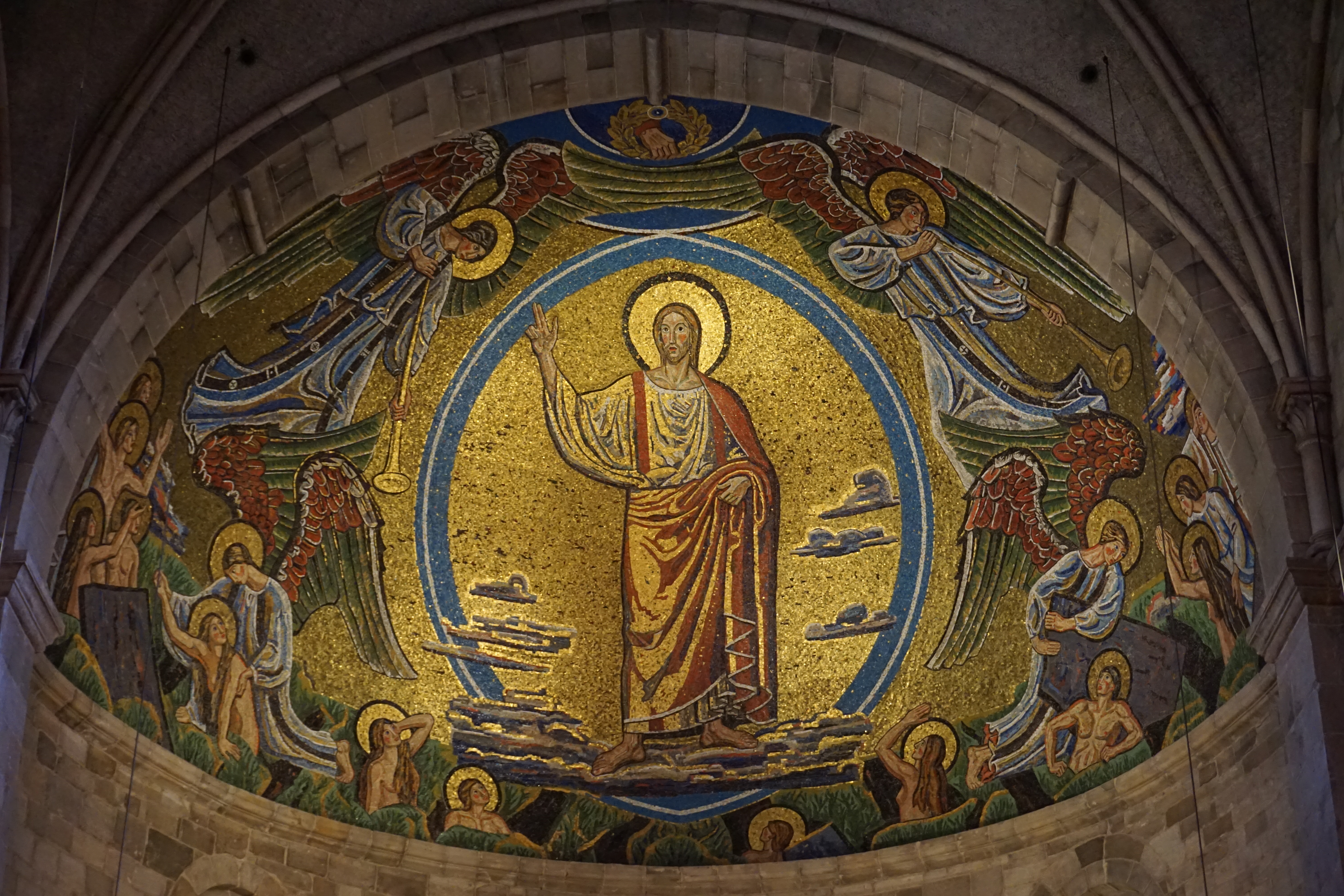
A mosaic depicting Jesus in the apse of Lund Cathedral (Evangelical-Lutheran), Skåne

== See also ==
- Architecture of cathedrals and great churches
- Architectural development of the eastern end of cathedrals in England and France
- Byzantine architecture
- Church architecture
- Niche (architecture)
- Scarsella (architecture)
