= Relief =

Sculptural technique of embossed depth

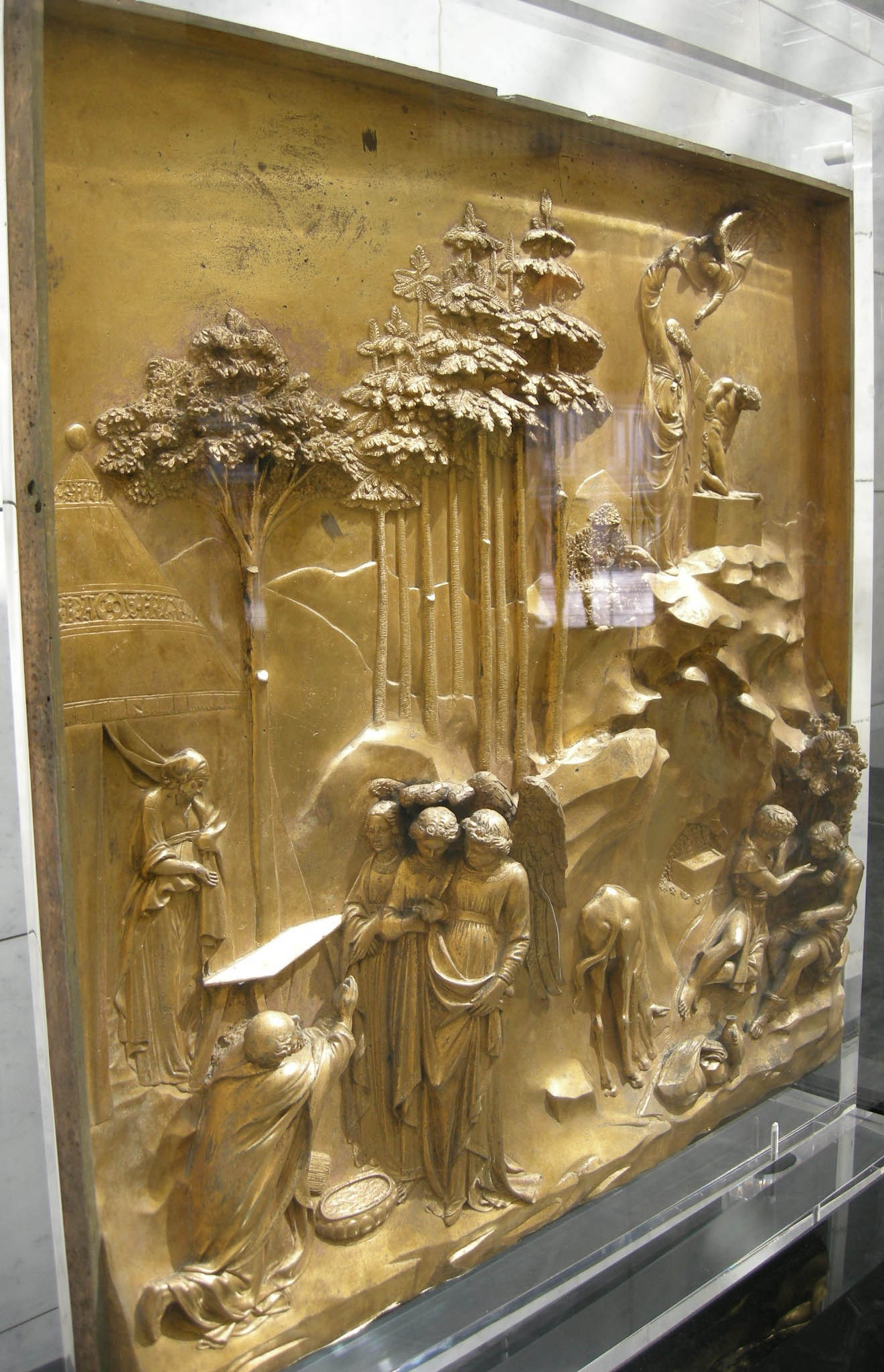
Side view of Lorenzo Ghiberti's cast gilt-bronze Gates of Paradise at the Florence Baptistery in Florence, Italy, combining high-relief main figures with backgrounds mostly in low relief.

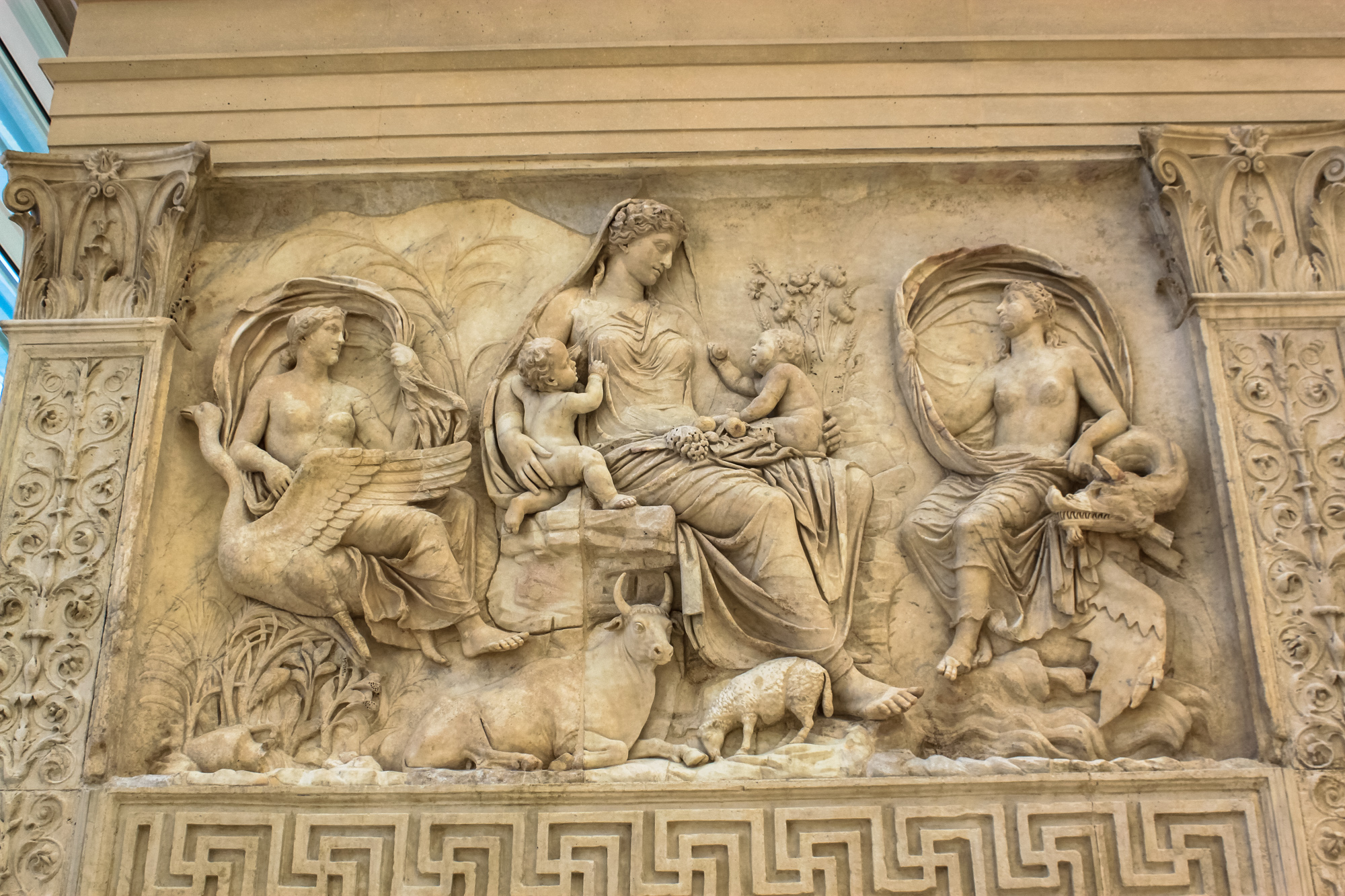
A common mixture of high and low relief, in the Roman Ara Pacis, placed to be seen from below. Low relief background.

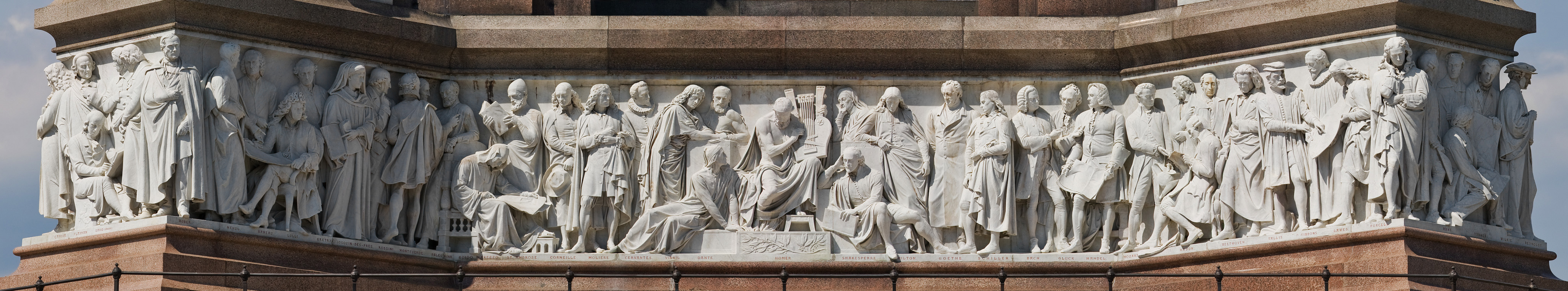
A face of the high-relief Frieze of Parnassus round the base of the Albert Memorial in London. Most of the heads and many feet are completely undercut, but the torsos are "engaged" with the surface behind.

Relief is a sculptural method in which the sculpted pieces remain attached to a solid background of the same material. The term relief is from the Latin verb relevare, to raise (lit. 'to lift back'). To create a sculpture in relief (also known as a relief sculpture) is to give the impression that the sculpted material has been raised above the background plane. When a relief is carved into a flat surface of wood (producing a relief carving) or stone, the field is actually lowered, leaving the unsculpted areas seeming higher. The approach requires chiselling away of the background, which can be time-intensive. On the other hand, a relief saves forming the rear of a subject, and is less fragile and more securely fixed than a sculpture in the round, especially one of a standing figure where the ankles are a potential weak point, particularly in stone. In other materials such as metal, clay, plaster stucco, ceramics or papier-mâché the form can be simply added to or raised up from the background. Monumental bronze reliefs are made by casting.

There are different degrees of relief depending on the degree of projection of the sculpted form from the field, for which the Italian and French terms are still sometimes used in English. The full range includes high relief (Italian alto-rilievo, French haut-relief), where more than 50% of the depth is shown and there may be undercut areas, mid-relief (Italian mezzo-rilievo), low relief (Italian basso-rilievo, French: bas-relief), and shallow-relief (Italian rilievo schiacciato), where the plane is only very slightly lower than the sculpted elements. There is also sunk relief, which was mainly restricted to Ancient Egypt (see below). However, the distinction between high relief and low relief is the clearest and most important, and these two are generally the only terms used to discuss most work.

The definition of these terms is somewhat variable, and many works combine areas in more than one of them, rarely sliding between them in a single figure; accordingly some writers prefer to avoid all distinctions. The opposite of relief sculpture is counter-relief, intaglio, or cavo-rilievo, where the form is cut into the field or background rather than rising from it; this is very rare in monumental sculpture. Hyphens may or may not be used in all these terms, though they are rarely seen in "sunk relief" and are usual in "bas-relief" and "counter-relief". Works in the technique are described as "in relief", and, especially in monumental sculpture, the work itself is "a relief".

Reliefs are common throughout the world on the walls of buildings and a variety of smaller settings, and a sequence of several panels or sections of relief may represent an extended narrative. Relief is more suitable for depicting complicated subjects with many figures and very active poses, such as battles, than free-standing "sculpture in the round". Most ancient architectural reliefs were originally painted, which helped to define forms in low relief. The subject of reliefs is for convenient reference assumed in this article to be usually figures, but sculpture in relief often depicts decorative geometrical or foliage patterns, as in the arabesques of Islamic art, and may be of any subject.

Rock reliefs are those carved into solid rock in the open air (if inside caves, whether natural or human-made, they are more likely to be called "rock-cut"). This type is found in many cultures, in particular those of the Ancient Near East and Buddhist countries. A stele is a single standing stone; many of these carry reliefs.

== Types ==
The distinction between high and low relief is somewhat subjective, and the two are very often combined in a single work. In particular, most later "high reliefs" contain sections in low relief, usually in the background. From the Parthenon Frieze onwards, many single figures in large monumental sculpture have heads in high relief, but their lower legs are in low relief. The slightly projecting figures created in this way work well in reliefs that are seen from below, and reflect that the heads of figures are usually of more interest to both artist and viewer than the legs or feet. As unfinished examples from various periods show, raised reliefs, whether high or low, were normally "blocked out" by marking the outline of the figure and reducing the background areas to the new background level, work no doubt performed by apprentices (see gallery).

=== Low relief or bas-relief ===
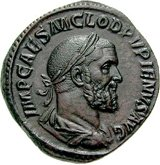
Low-relief on Roman sestertius, 238 AD

A low relief is a projecting image with a shallow overall depth, for example used on coins, on which all images are in low relief. In the lowest reliefs the relative depth of the elements shown is completely distorted, and if seen from the side the image makes no sense, but from the front the small variations in depth register as a three-dimensional image. Other versions distort depth much less. The term comes from the Italian basso rilievo via the French bas-relief (French pronunciation: [baʁəljɛf]), both meaning "low relief". The former is now a very old-fashioned term in English, and the latter term is becoming so.

Low relief is a technique which requires less work than high relief, and is therefore cheaper to produce, as less of the background needs to be removed in a carving, or less modelling is required. In the art of Ancient Egypt, Assyrian palace reliefs, and other ancient Near Eastern and Asian cultures, a consistent very low relief was commonly used for the whole composition. These images would usually be painted after carving, which helped define the forms; today the paint has worn off in the great majority of surviving examples, but minute, invisible remains of paint can usually be discovered through chemical means.

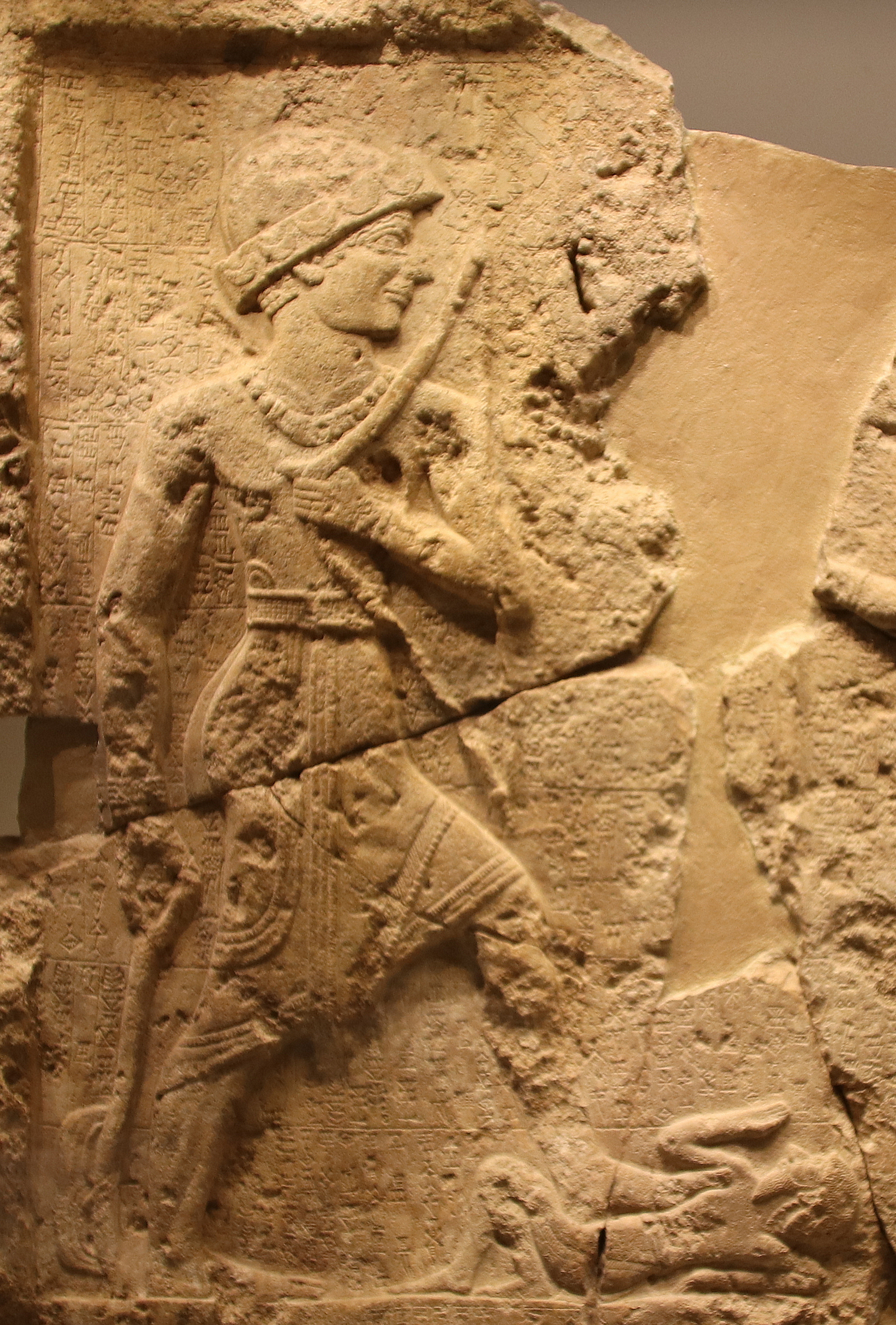
A low-relief dating to c. 2000 BC, from the kingdom of Simurrum, modern Iraq

The Ishtar Gate of Babylon, now in Berlin, has low reliefs of large animals formed from moulded bricks, glazed in colour. Plaster, which made the technique far easier, was widely used in Egypt and the Near East from antiquity into Islamic times (latterly for architectural decoration, as at the Alhambra), Rome, and Europe from at least the Renaissance, as well as probably elsewhere. However, it needs very good conditions to survive long in unmaintained buildings – Roman decorative plasterwork is mainly known from Pompeii and other sites buried by ash from Mount Vesuvius. Low relief was relatively rare in Western medieval art, but may be found, for example in wooden figures or scenes on the insides of the folding wings of multi-panel altarpieces.

The revival of low relief, which was seen as a classical style, begins early in the Renaissance; the Tempio Malatestiano in Rimini, a pioneering classicist building, designed by Leon Battista Alberti around 1450, uses low reliefs by Agostino di Duccio inside and on the external walls. Since the Renaissance plaster has been very widely used for indoor ornamental work such as cornices and ceilings, but in the 16th century it was used for large figures (many also using high relief) at the Chateau of Fontainebleau, which were imitated more crudely elsewhere, for example in the Elizabethan Hardwick Hall.

Shallow-relief, in Italian rilievo stiacciato or rilievo schicciato ("squashed relief"), is a very shallow relief, which merges into engraving in places, and can be hard to read in photographs. It is often used for the background areas of compositions with the main elements in low-relief, but its use over a whole (usually rather small) piece was effectively invented and perfected by the Italian Renaissance sculptor Donatello.

In later Western art, until a 20th-century revival, low relief was used mostly for smaller works or combined with higher relief to convey a sense of distance, or to give depth to the composition, especially for scenes with many figures and a landscape or architectural background, in the same way that lighter colours are used for the same purpose in painting. Thus figures in the foreground are sculpted in high-relief, those in the background in low-relief. Low relief may use any medium or technique of sculpture, stone carving and metal casting being most common. Large architectural compositions all in low relief saw a revival in the 20th century, being popular on buildings in Art Deco and related styles, which borrowed from the ancient low reliefs now available in museums. Some sculptors, including Eric Gill, have adopted the "squashed" depth of low relief in works that are actually free-standing.

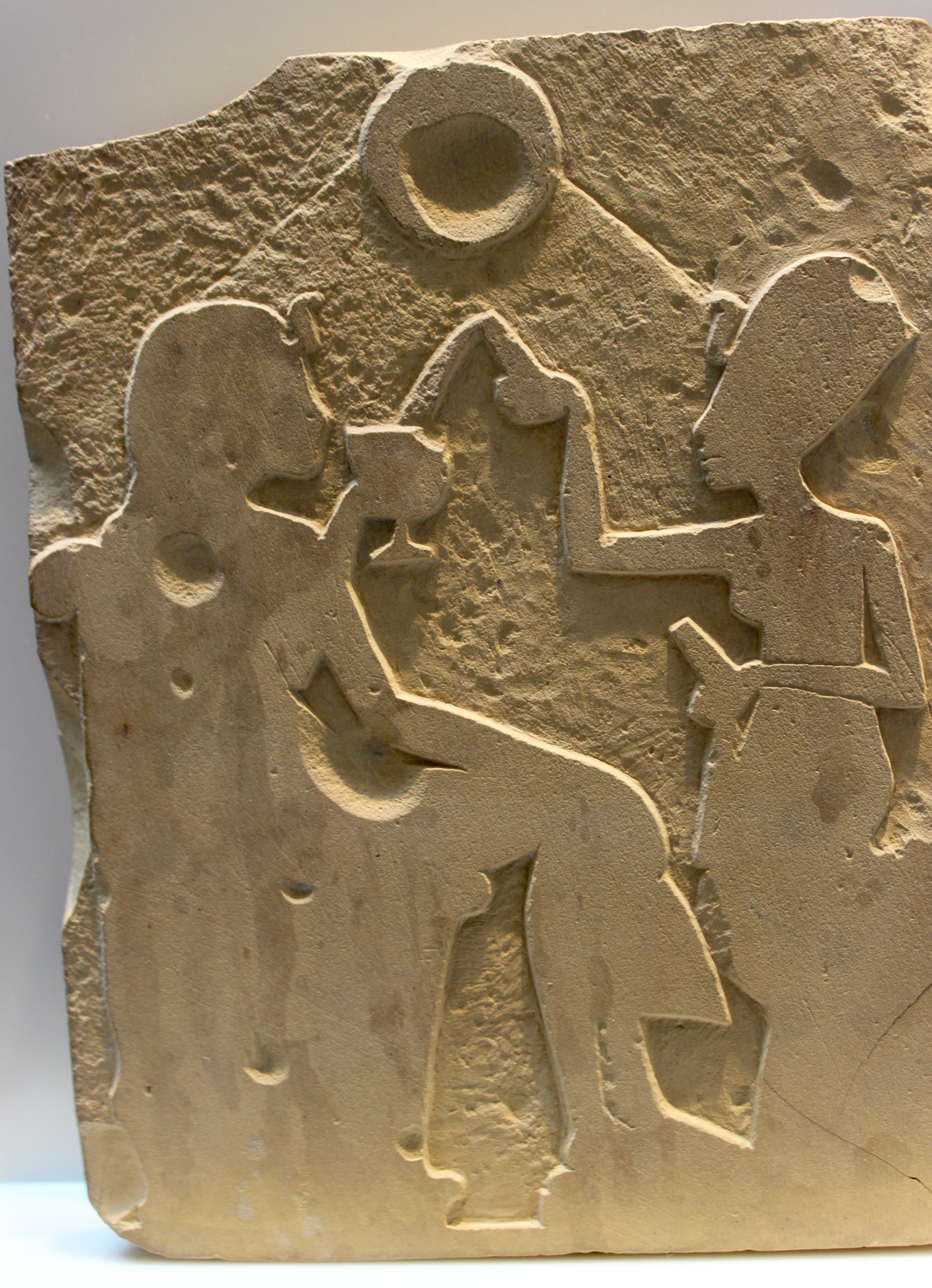
"Blocked-out" unfinished low relief of Ahkenaten and Nefertiti; unfinished Greek and Persian high-reliefs show the same method of beginning a work.

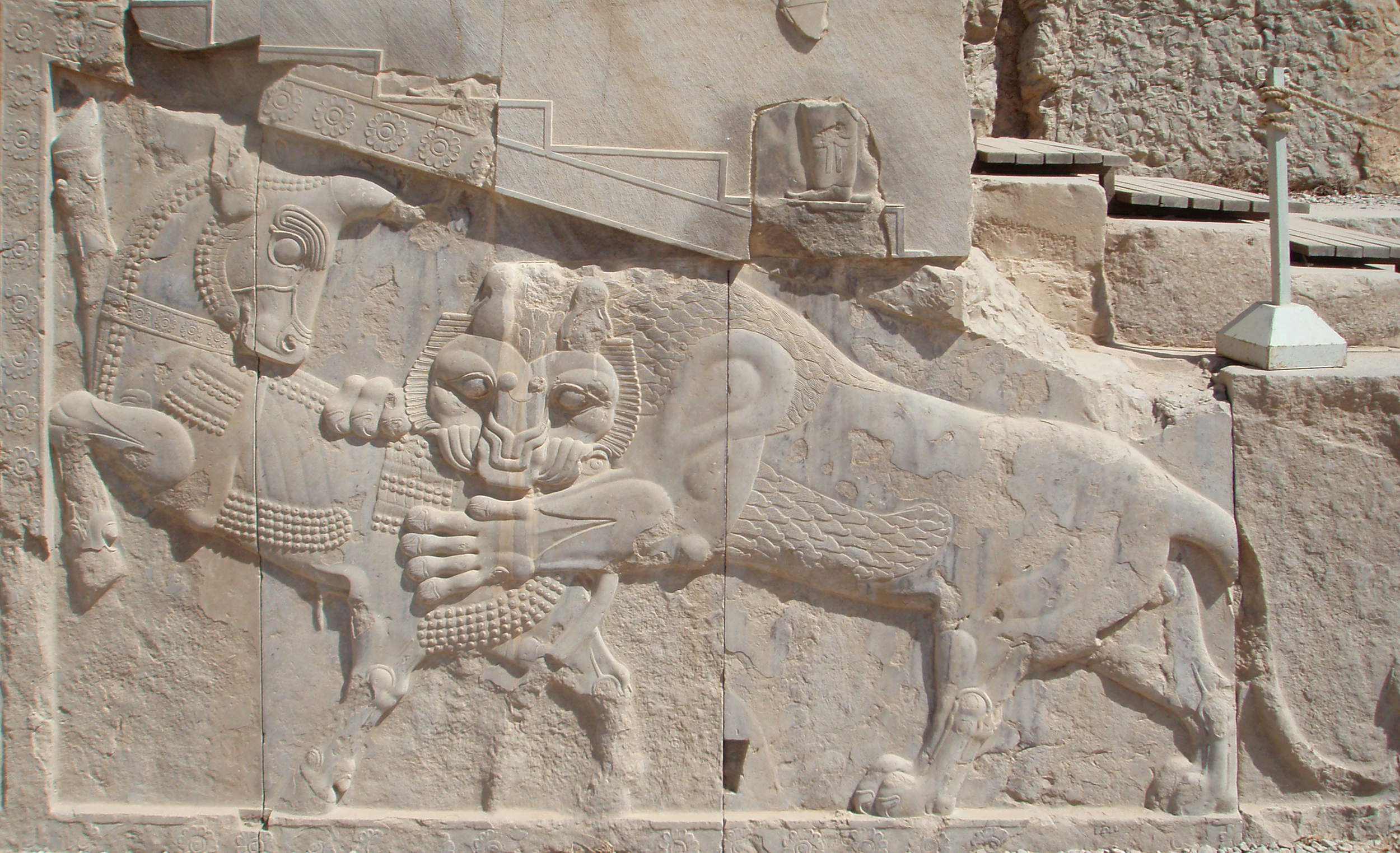
Persian low or bas-relief in Persepolis – a symbol of Zoroastrian Nowruz – at the spring equinox the power of the bull (personifying Earth) and lion (personifying the Sun) are equal.

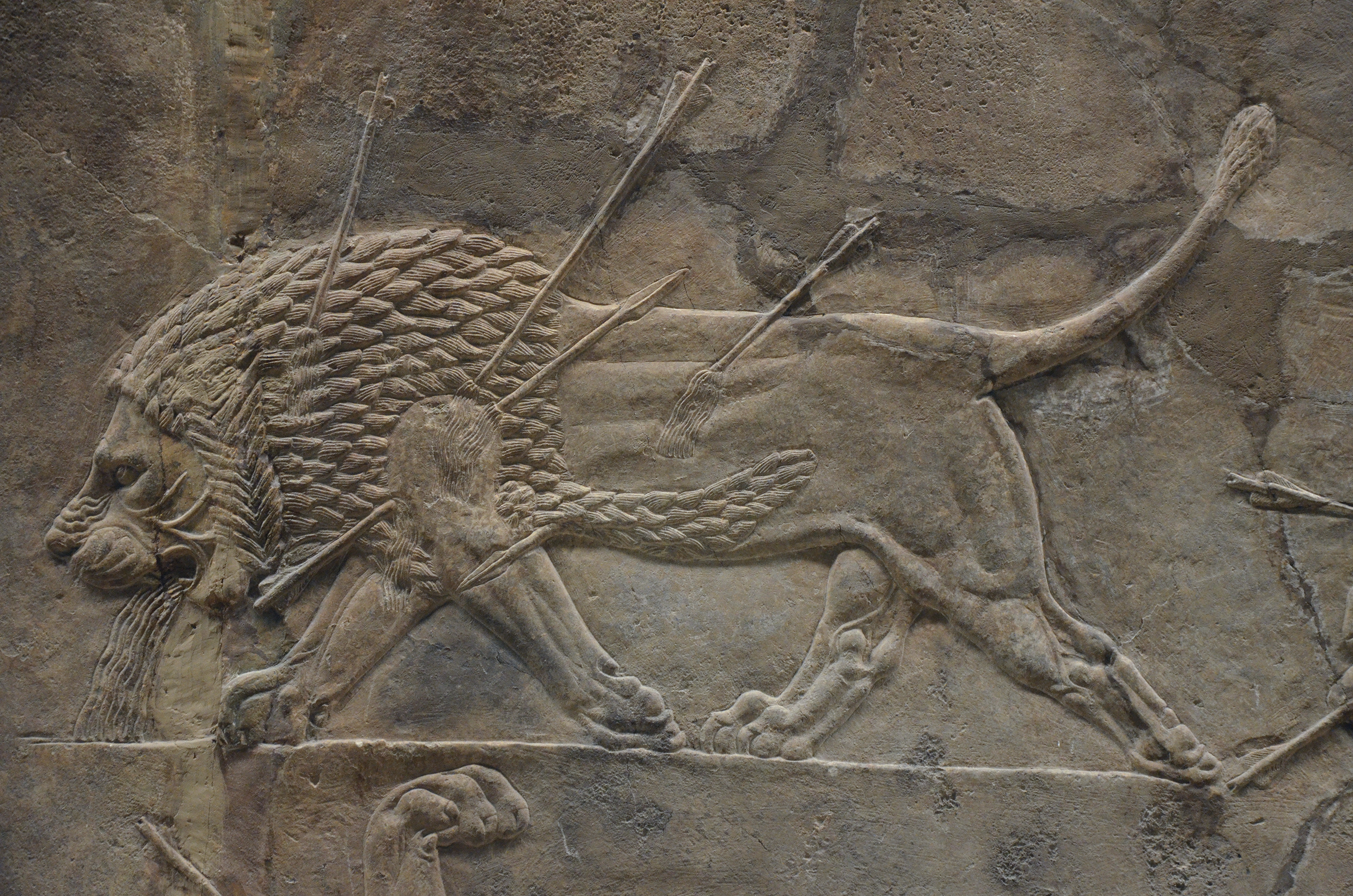
Assyrian low relief, Lion Hunt of Ashurbanipal, North Palace, Nineveh

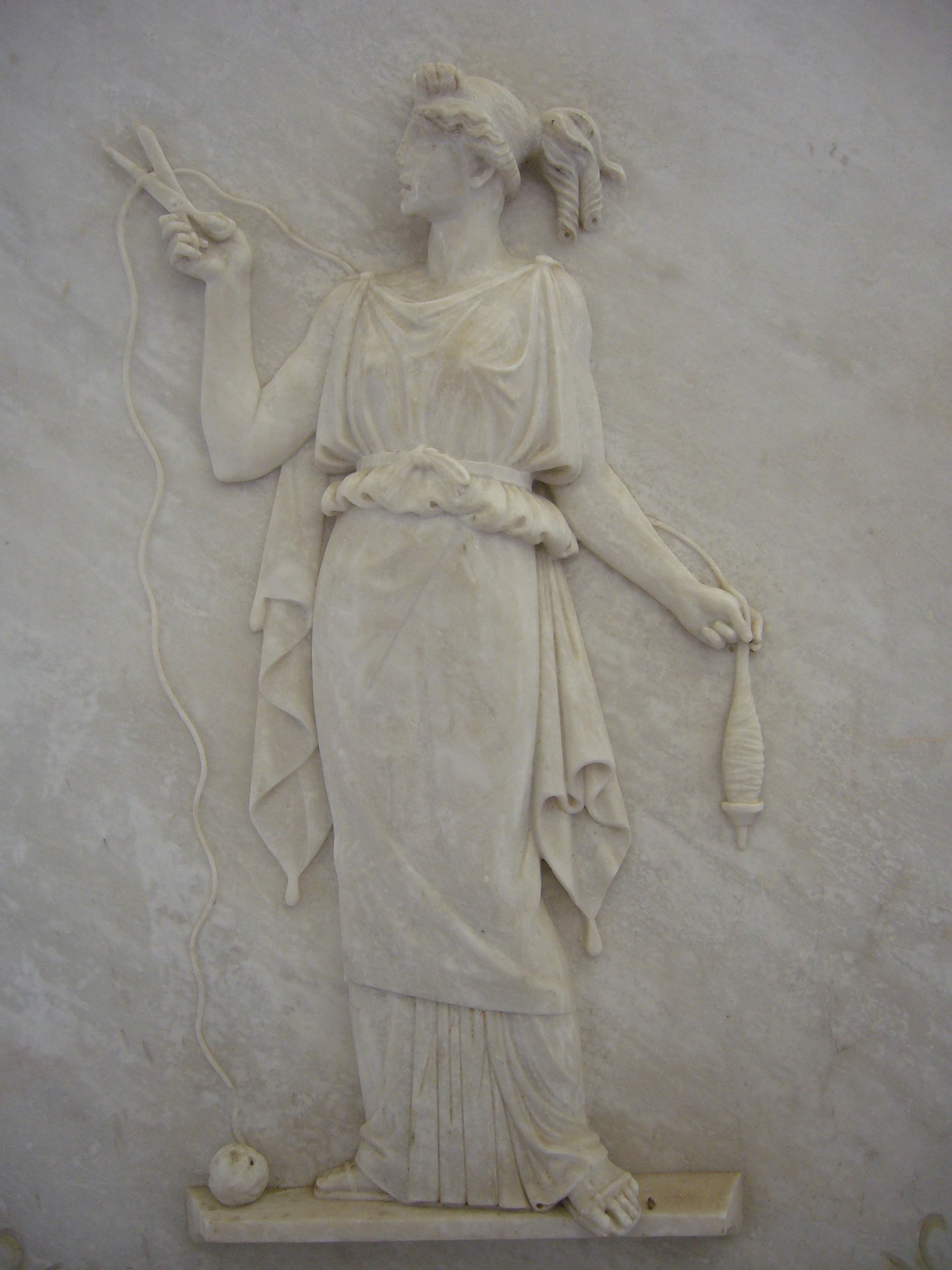
Atropos cutting the thread of life. Modern Greek low relief.

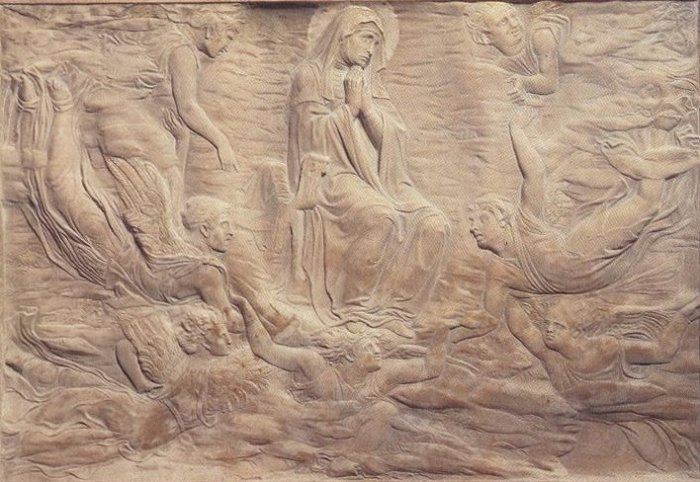
Donatello's rilievo stiacciato or shallow relief of the "Assumption of the Virgin" on a tomb, 1420s

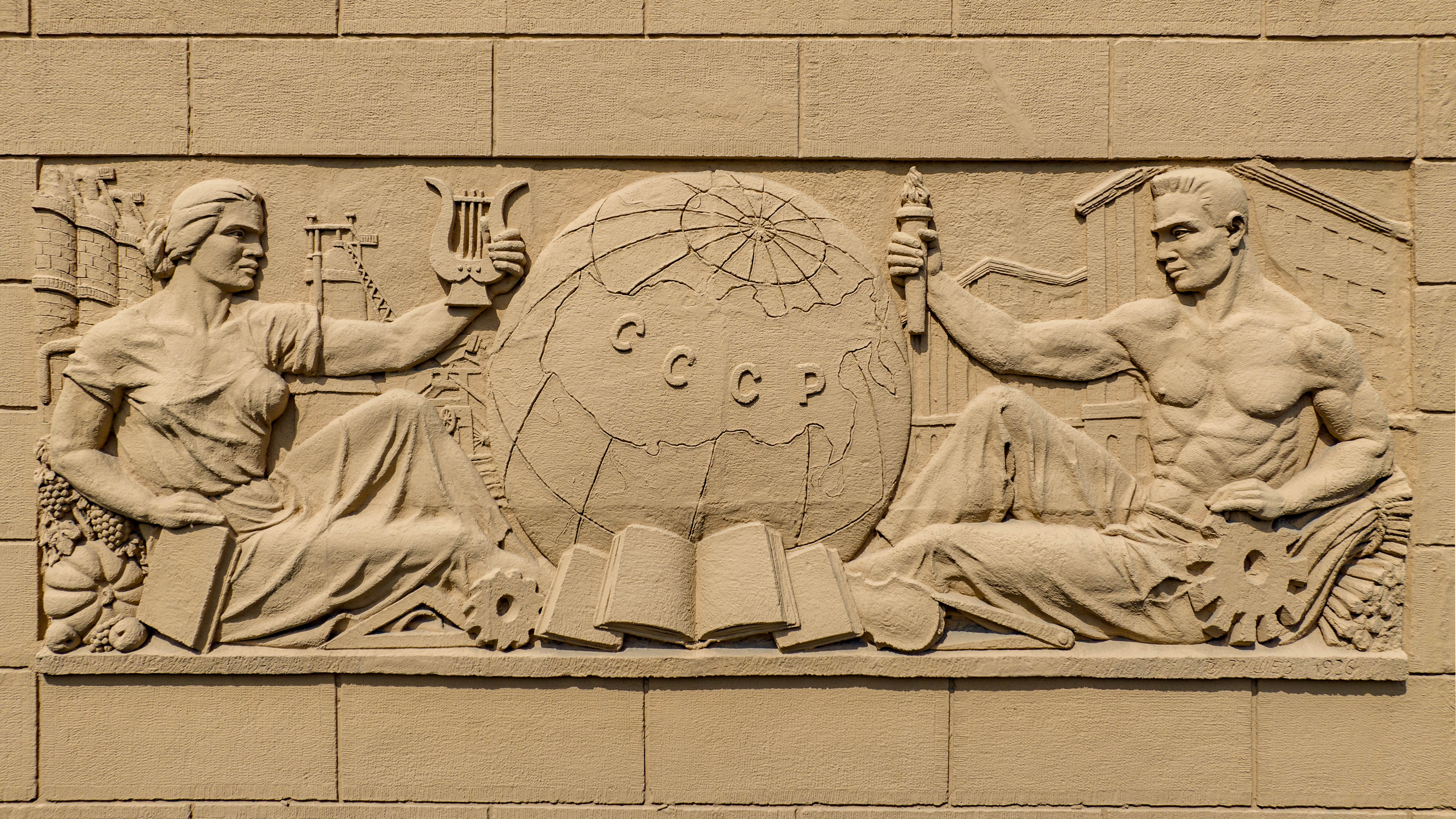
Soviet bas-relief

=== Mid-relief ===
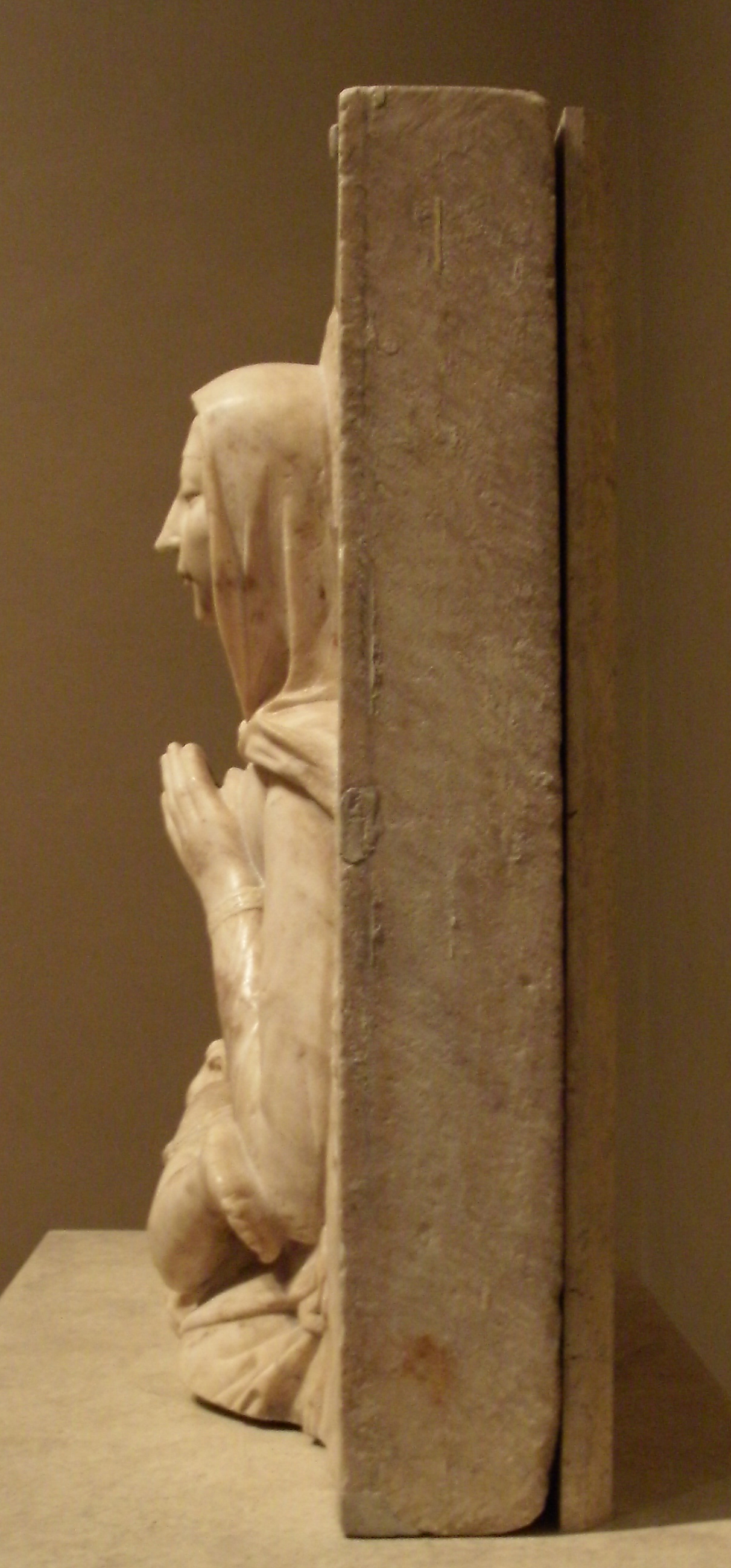
Side view of mid-relief: Madonna and Child, marble of c. 1500/1510 by an unknown north Italian sculptor

Mid-relief, "half-relief" or mezzo-rilievo is somewhat imprecisely defined, and the term is not often used in English, the works usually being described as low relief instead. The typical traditional definition is that about half of the subject projects, and no elements are undercut or fully disengaged from the background field. The depth of the elements shown is normally somewhat distorted.

Mid-relief is probably the most common type of relief found in the Hindu and Buddhist art of India and Southeast Asia. The low to mid-reliefs of 2nd-century BCE to 6th-century CE Ajanta Caves and 5th- to 10th-century Ellora Caves in India are rock reliefs. Most of these reliefs are used to narrate sacred scriptures, such as the 1,460 panels of the 9th-century Borobudur temple in Central Java, Indonesia, narrating the Jataka tales or lives of the Buddha. Other examples are low reliefs narrating the Ramayana Hindu epic in Prambanan temple, also in Java, in Cambodia, the temples of Angkor, with scenes including the Samudra manthan or "Churning the Ocean of Milk" at the 12th-century Angkor Wat, and reliefs of apsaras. At Bayon temple in Angkor Thom there are scenes of daily life in the Khmer Empire.

=== High relief ===
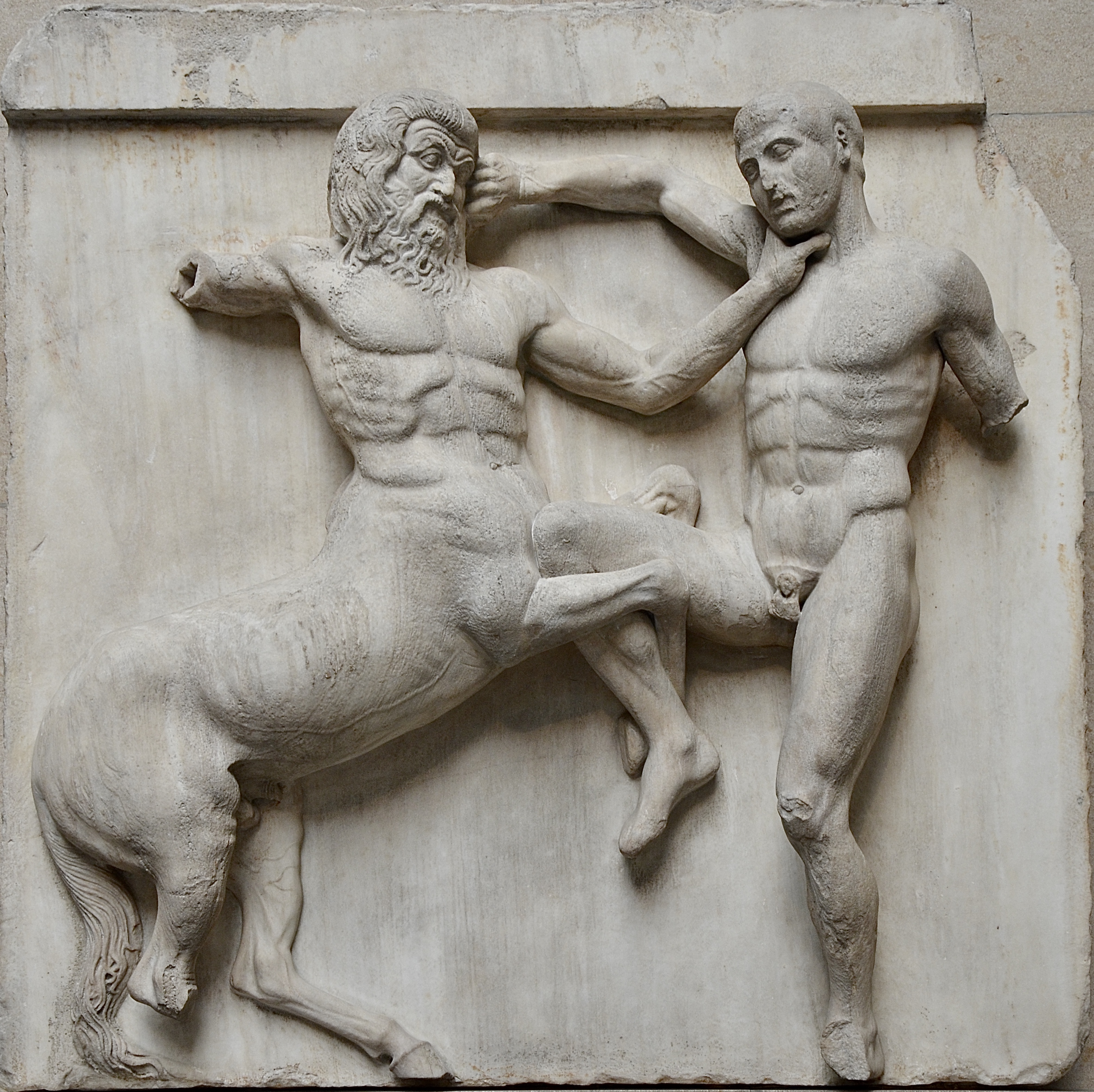
High relief metope from the Classical Greek Parthenon Marbles. Some front limbs are actually detached from the background completely, while the centaur's left rear leg is in low relief.

High relief (or altorilievo, from Italian) is where in general more than half the mass of the sculpted figure projects from the background. Indeed, the most prominent elements of the composition, especially heads and limbs, are often completely undercut, detaching them from the field. The parts of the subject that are seen are normally depicted at their full depth, unlike low relief where the elements seen are "squashed" flatter. High relief thus uses essentially the same style and techniques as free-standing sculpture, and in the case of a single figure gives largely the same view as a person standing directly in front of a free-standing statue would have. All cultures and periods in which large sculptures were created used this technique in monumental sculpture and architecture.

Most of the many grand figure reliefs in Ancient Greek sculpture used a very "high" version of high relief, with elements often fully free of the background, and parts of figures crossing over each other to indicate depth. The metopes of the Parthenon have largely lost their fully rounded elements, except for heads, showing the advantages of relief in terms of durability. High relief has remained the dominant form for reliefs with figures in Western sculpture, also being common in Indian temple sculpture. Smaller Greek sculptures such as private tombs, and smaller decorative areas such as friezes on large buildings, more often used low relief.

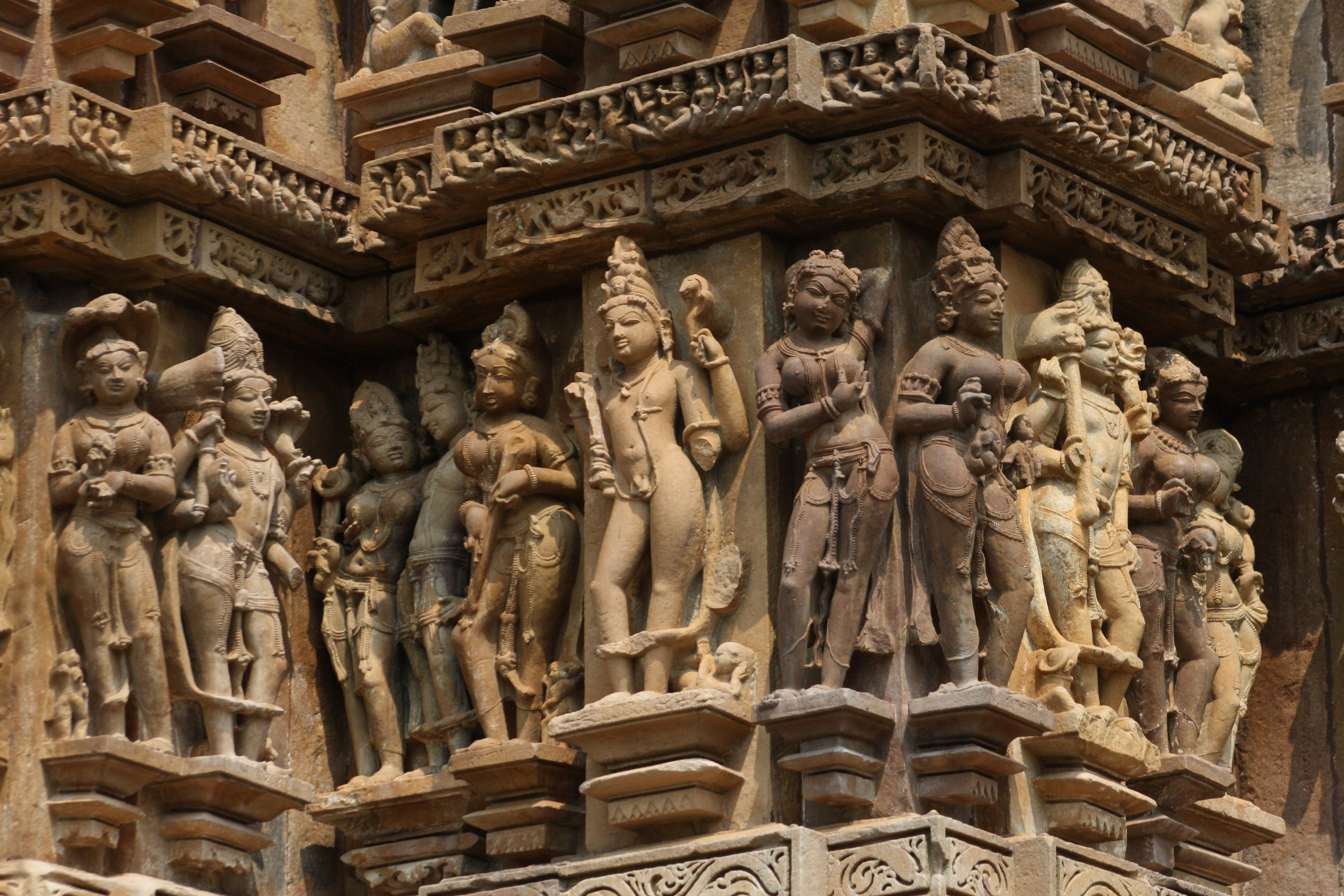
High-relief deities at Khajuraho, India

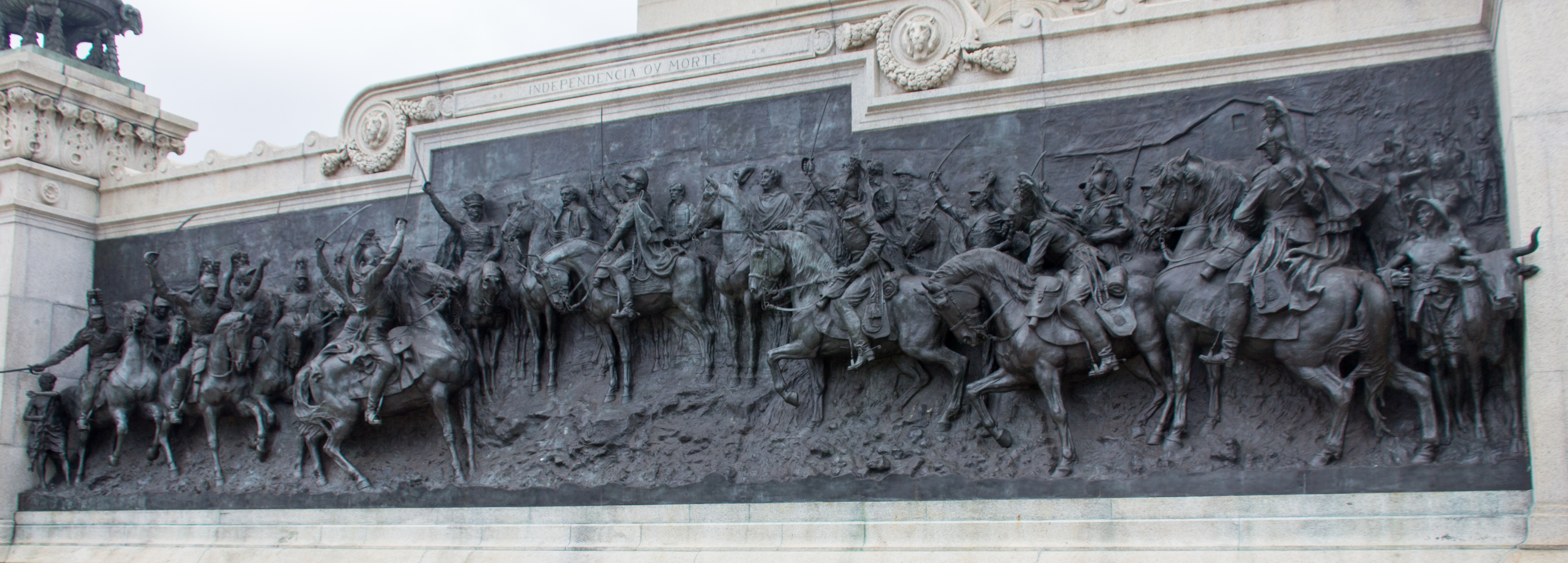
Very high relief at the Monument to the Independence of Brazil in São Paulo; derivative representation of Pedro Américo's 1888 painting Independence or Death

Hellenistic and Roman sarcophagus reliefs were cut with a drill rather than chisels, enabling and encouraging compositions extremely crowded with figures, like the Ludovisi Battle sarcophagus (250–260 CE). These are also seen in the enormous strips of reliefs that wound around Roman triumphal columns. The sarcophagi in particular exerted a huge influence on later Western sculpture. The European Middle Ages tended to use high relief for all purposes in stone, though like Ancient Roman sculpture, their reliefs were typically not as high as in Ancient Greece. Very high relief re-emerged in the Renaissance, and was especially used in wall-mounted funerary art and later on Neoclassical pediments and public monuments.

In the Buddhist and Hindu art of India and Southeast Asia, high relief can also be found, although it is not as common as low to mid-reliefs. Famous examples of Indian high reliefs can be found at the Khajuraho temples, with voluptuous, twisting figures that often illustrate the erotic Kamasutra positions. In the 9th-century Prambanan temple, Central Java, high reliefs of Lokapala devatas, the guardians of deities of the directions, are found.

The largest high relief sculpture in the world is the Stone Mountain Confederate Memorial in the U.S. state of Georgia, which was cut 42 feet deep into the mountain, and measures 90 feet in height, 190 feet in width, and lies 400 feet above the ground.

=== Sunk relief ===
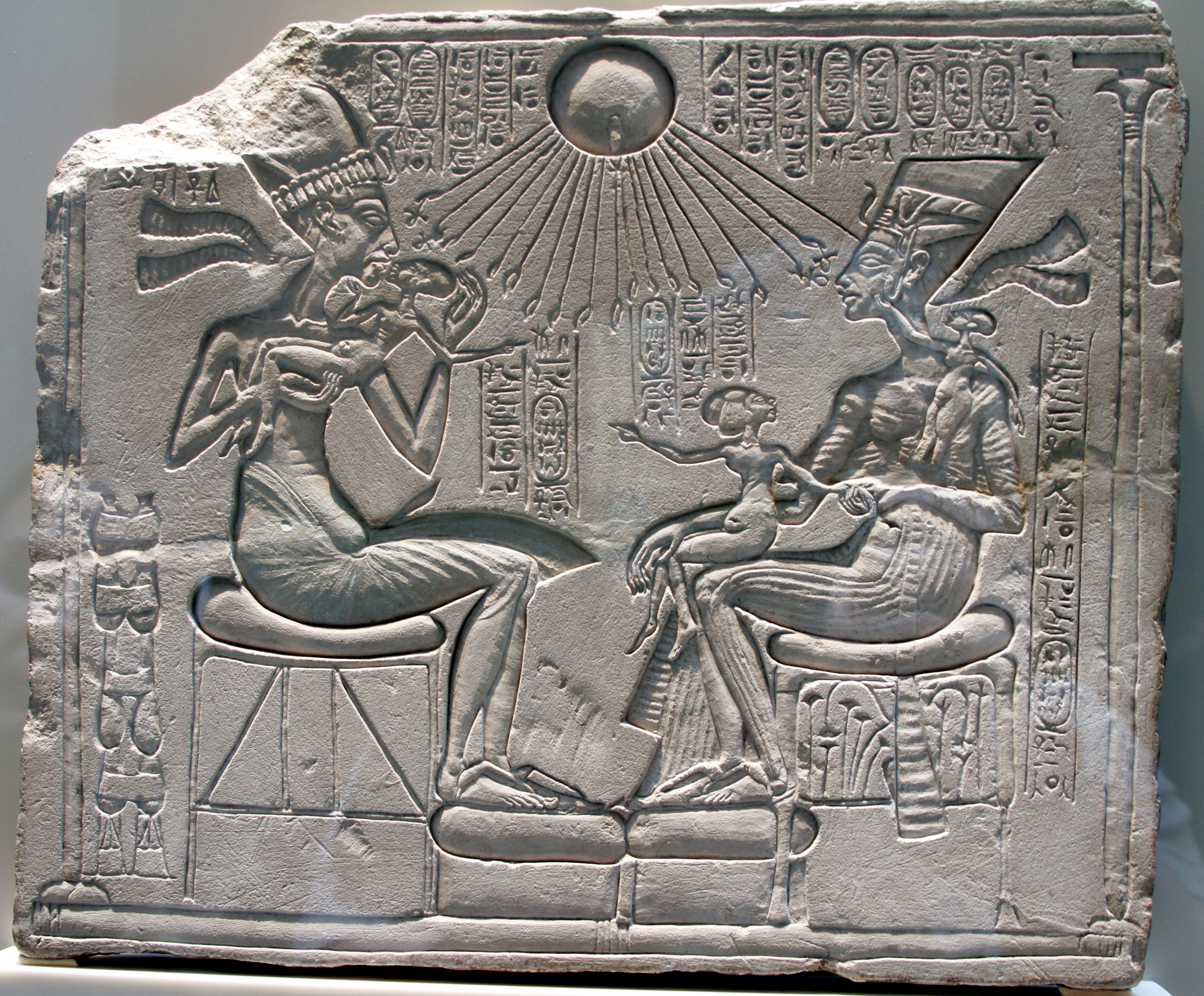
A sunk-relief depiction of Pharaoh Akhenaten with his wife Nefertiti and daughters. The main background has not been removed, merely that in the immediate vicinity of the sculpted form. Note how strong shadows are needed to define the image.

Sunk or sunken relief is largely restricted to the art of Ancient Egypt where it is very common, becoming after the Amarna period of Ahkenaten the dominant type used, as opposed to low relief. It had been used earlier, but mainly for large reliefs on external walls, and for hieroglyphs and cartouches. The image is made by cutting the relief sculpture itself into a flat surface to enhance the impression of three-dimensionality. In a simpler form, the images are usually mostly linear in nature, like hieroglyphs, but in most cases the figure itself is in low relief, but set within a sunken area shaped round the image, so that the relief never rises beyond the original flat surface. In some cases the figures and other elements are in a very low relief that does not rise to the original surface, but others are modeled more fully, with some areas rising to the original surface. This method minimizes the work removing the background, while allowing normal relief modelling.

The technique is most successful with strong sunlight to emphasise the outlines and forms by shadow, as no attempt was made to soften the edge of the sunk area, leaving a face at a right-angle to the surface all around it. Some reliefs, especially funerary monuments with heads or busts from ancient Rome and later Western art, leave a "frame" at the original level around the edge of the relief, or place a head in a hemispherical recess in the block (see Roman example in gallery). Though essentially very similar to Egyptian sunk relief, but with a background space at the lower level around the figure, the term would not normally be used of such works.

It is also used for carving letters (typically om mani padme hum) in the mani stones of Tibetan Buddhism.

=== Counter-relief ===
Sunk relief technique is not to be confused with "counter-relief" or intaglio as seen on engraved gem seals – where an image is fully modeled in a "negative" manner. The image goes into the surface, so that when impressed on wax it gives an impression in normal relief. However many engraved gems were carved in cameo or normal relief.

A few very late Hellenistic monumental carvings in Egypt use full "negative" modelling as though on a gem seal, perhaps as sculptors trained in the Greek tradition attempted to use traditional Egyptian conventions.

=== Small objects ===
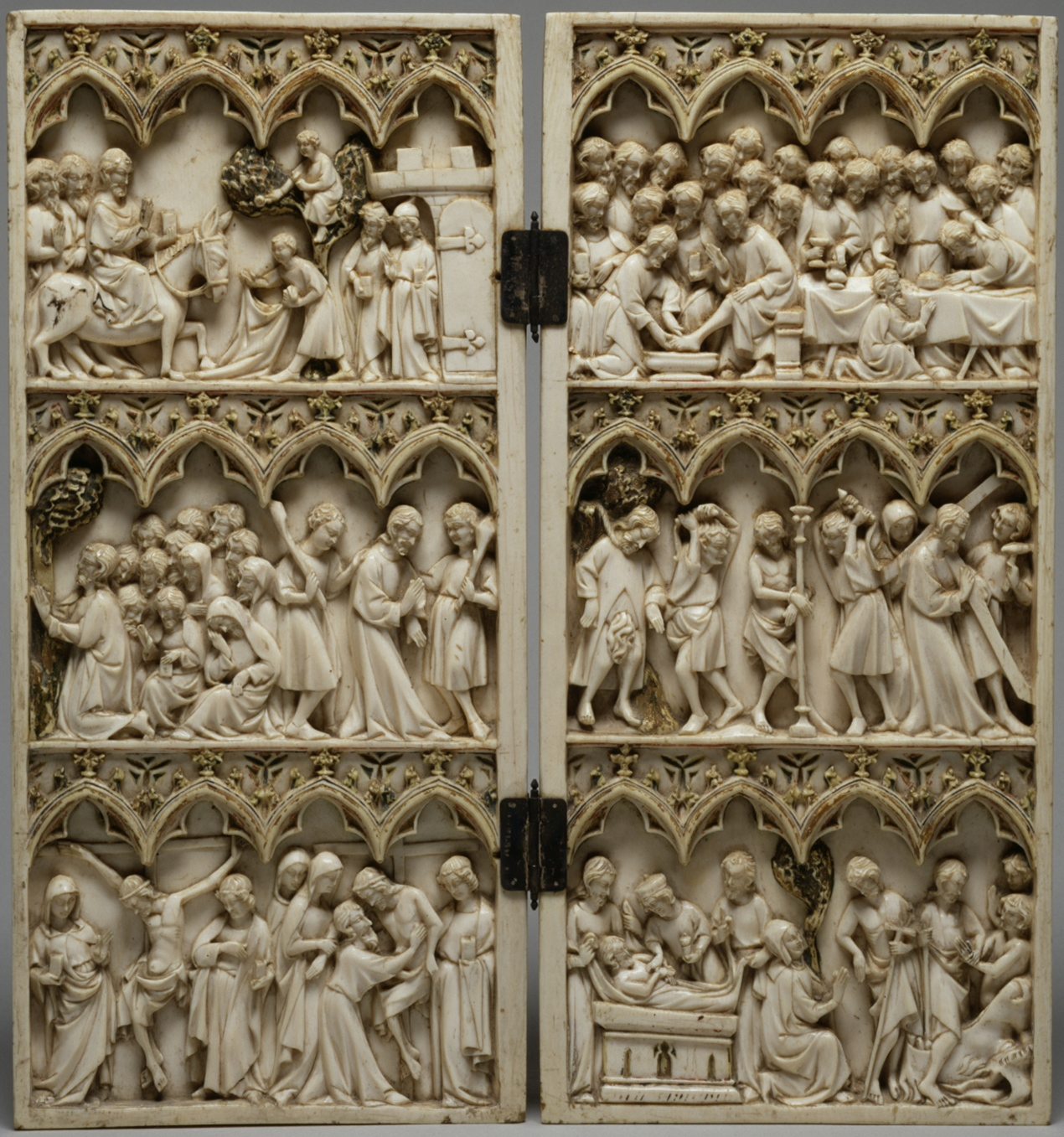
French Gothic diptych, 25 cm (9.8 in) high, with crowded scenes from the Life of Christ, c. 1350–1365

Small-scale reliefs have been carved in various materials, notably ivory, wood, and wax. Reliefs are often found in decorative arts such as ceramics and metalwork; these are less often described as "reliefs" than as "in relief". Small bronze reliefs are often in the form of "plaques" or plaquettes, which may be set in furniture or framed, or just kept as they are, a popular form for European collectors, especially in the Renaissance.

Various modelling techniques are used, such repoussé ("pushed-back") in metalwork, where a thin metal plate is shaped from behind using various metal or wood punches, producing a relief image. Casting has also been widely used in bronze and other metals. Casting and repoussé are often used in concert in to speed up production and add greater detail to the final relief. In stone, as well as engraved gems, larger hardstone carvings in semi-precious stones have been highly prestigious since ancient times in many Eurasian cultures. Reliefs in wax were produced at least from the Renaissance.

Carved ivory reliefs have been used since ancient times, and because the material, though expensive, cannot usually be reused, they have a relatively high survival rate, and for example consular diptychs represent a large proportion of the survivals of portable secular art from Late Antiquity. In the Gothic period the carving of ivory reliefs became a considerable luxury industry in Paris and other centres. As well as small diptychs and triptychs with densely packed religious scenes, usually from the New Testament, secular objects, usually in a lower relief, were also produced.

These were often round mirror-cases, combs, handles, and other small items, but included a few larger caskets like the Casket with Scenes of Romances (Walters 71264) in Baltimore, Maryland, in the United States. Originally they were very often painted in bright colours. Reliefs can be impressed by stamps onto clay, or the clay pressed into a mould bearing the design, as was usual with the mass-produced terra sigillata of Ancient Roman pottery. Decorative reliefs in plaster or stucco may be much larger; this form of architectural decoration is found in many styles of interiors in the post-Renaissance West, and in Islamic architecture.

== Gallery ==
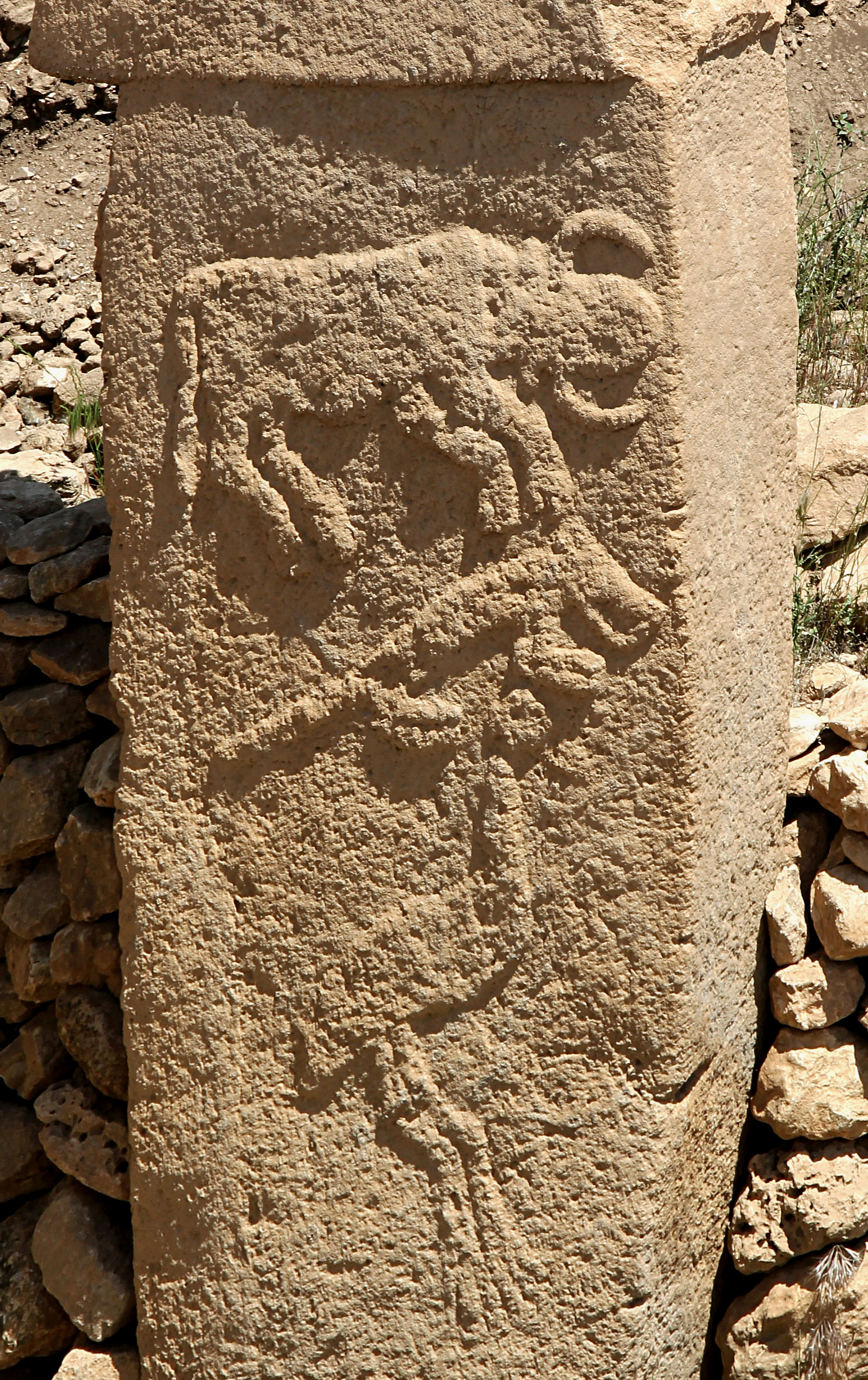
Low relief from the Pre-Pottery Neolithic archaeological site of Göbekli Tepe, believed to represent a bull, a fox, and a crane, c. 9,000 BC

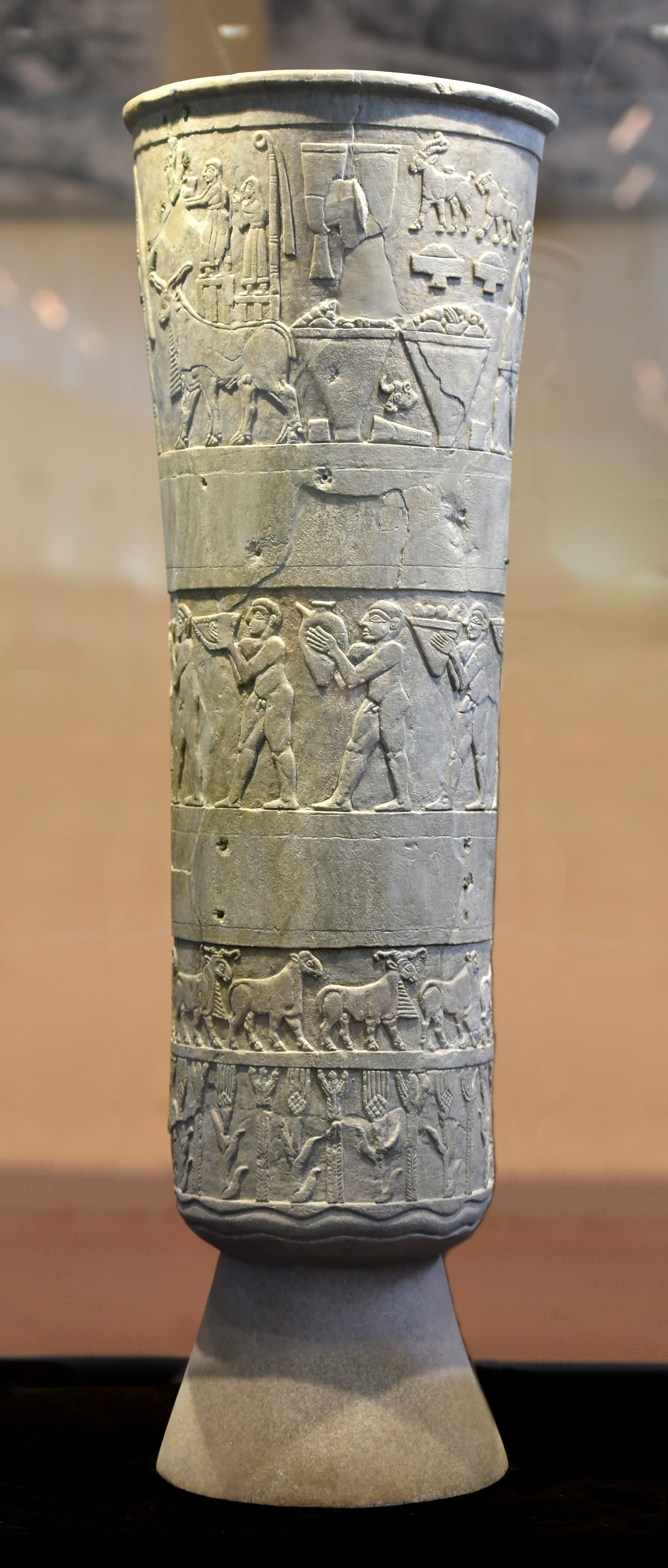
The Warka Vase of Sumer, a very early survival works of narrative relief, c. 3200–3000 BC. Alabaster. National Museum of Iraq.

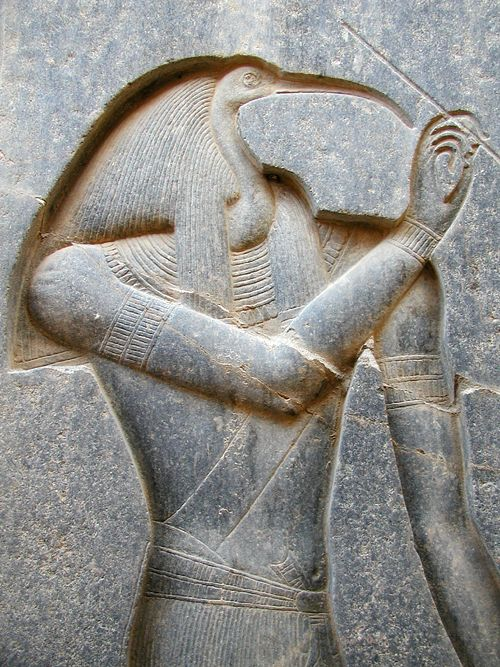
Sunk relief as low relief within a sunk outline, from the Luxor Temple in Egypt, carved in very hard granite

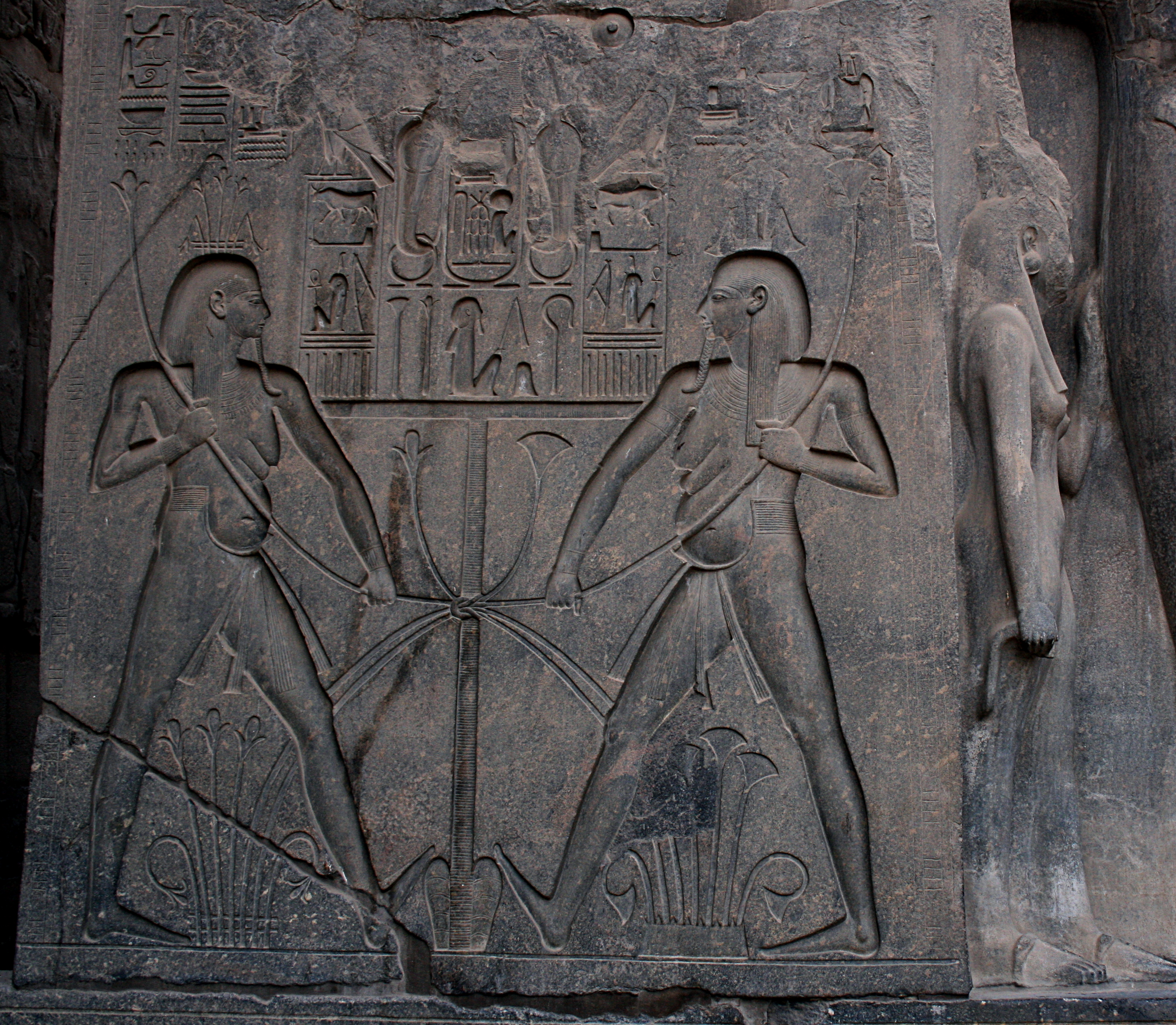
Low relief within a sunk outline, linear sunk relief in the hieroglyphs, and high relief (right), from Luxor

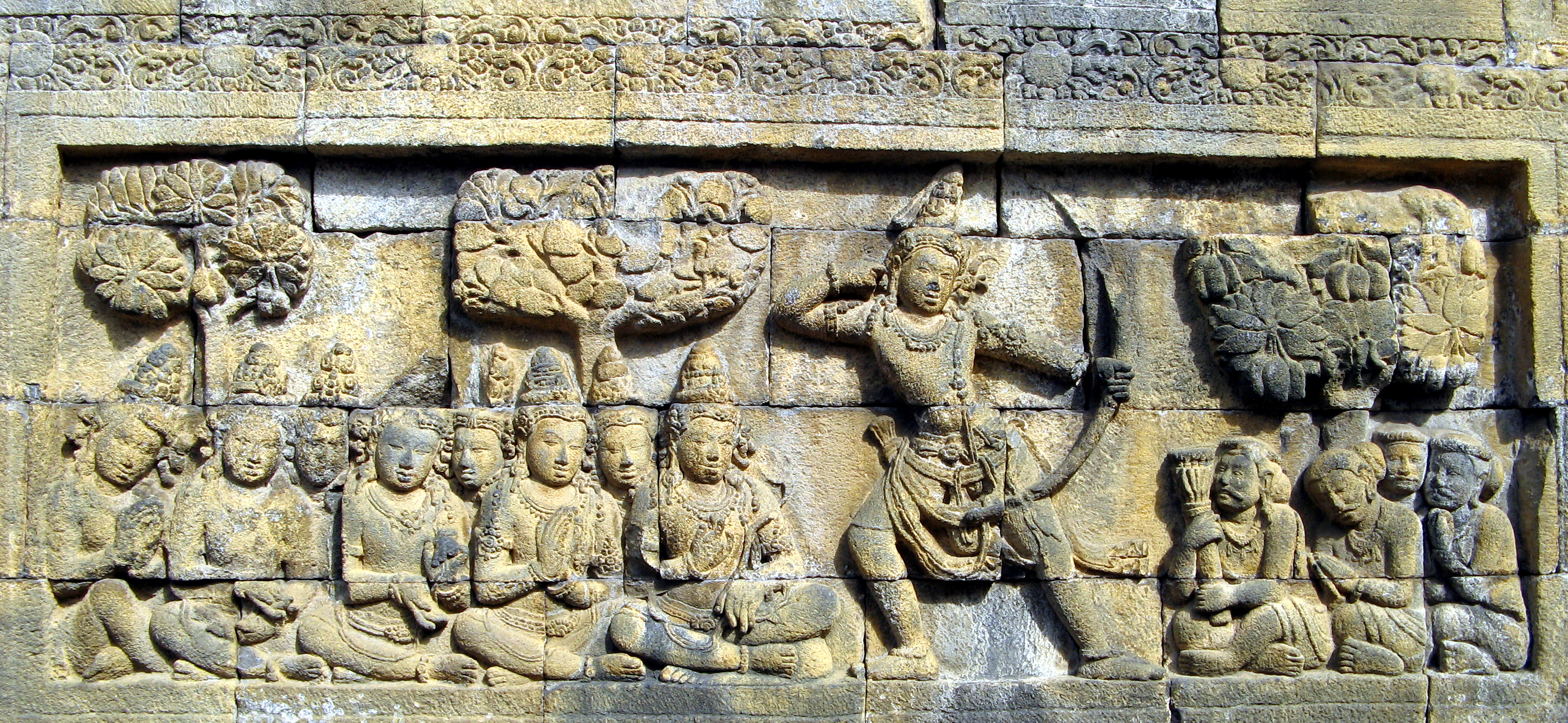
Low to mid-relief, 9th century, Borobudur. The temple has 1,460 panels of reliefs narrating Buddhist scriptures.

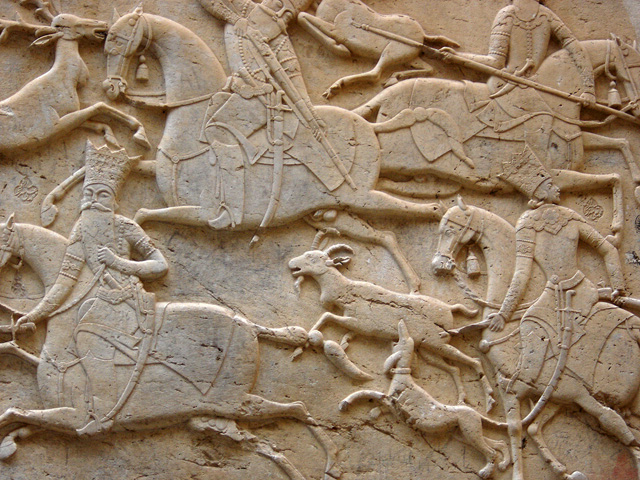
A Persian mid-relief (mezzo-rilievo) from the Qajar era, at Tangeh Savashi in Iran, which might also be described as two stages of low relief. This is a rock relief carved into a cliff.

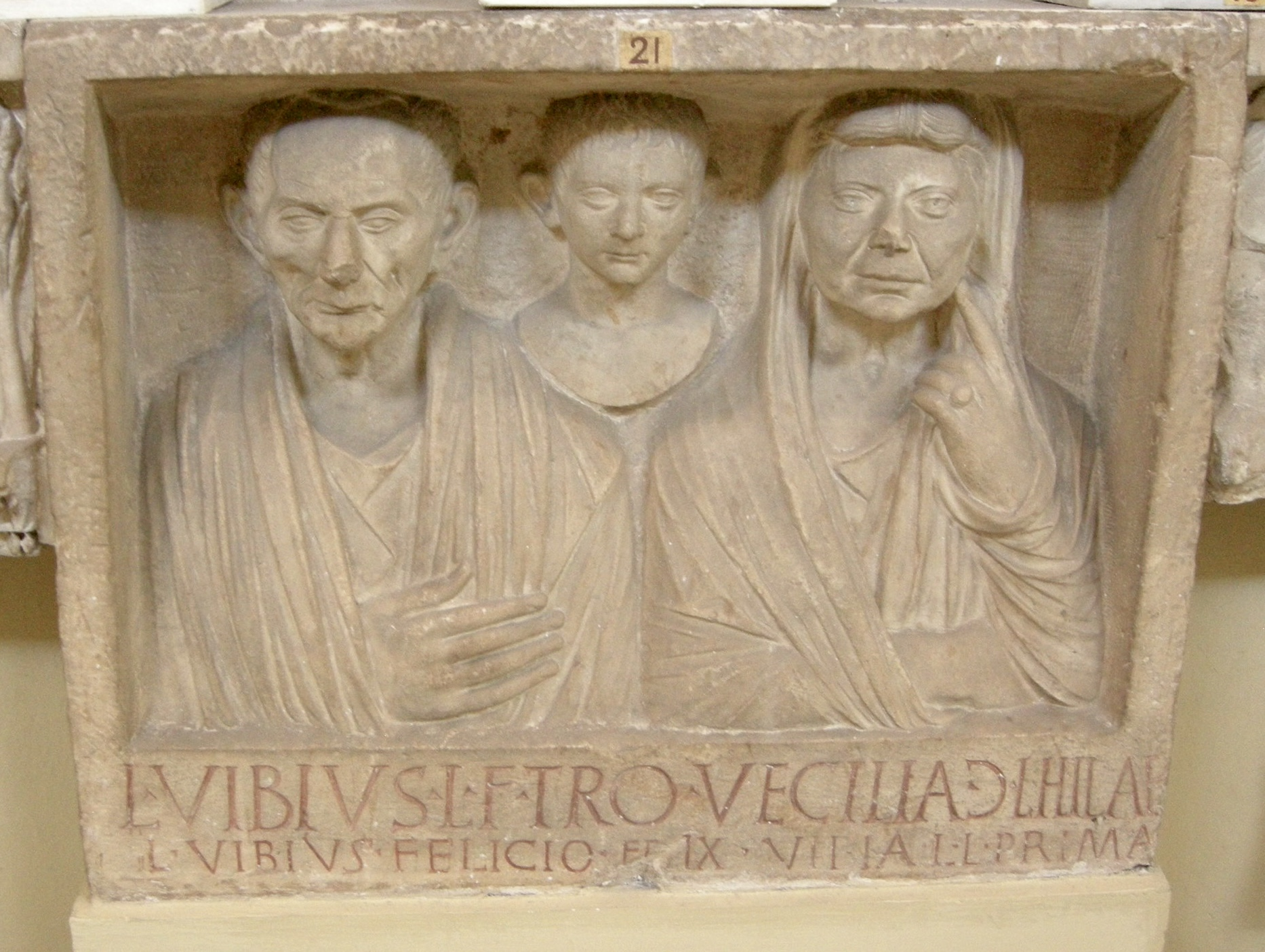
Roman funerary relief with frame at original level, but not sunk relief

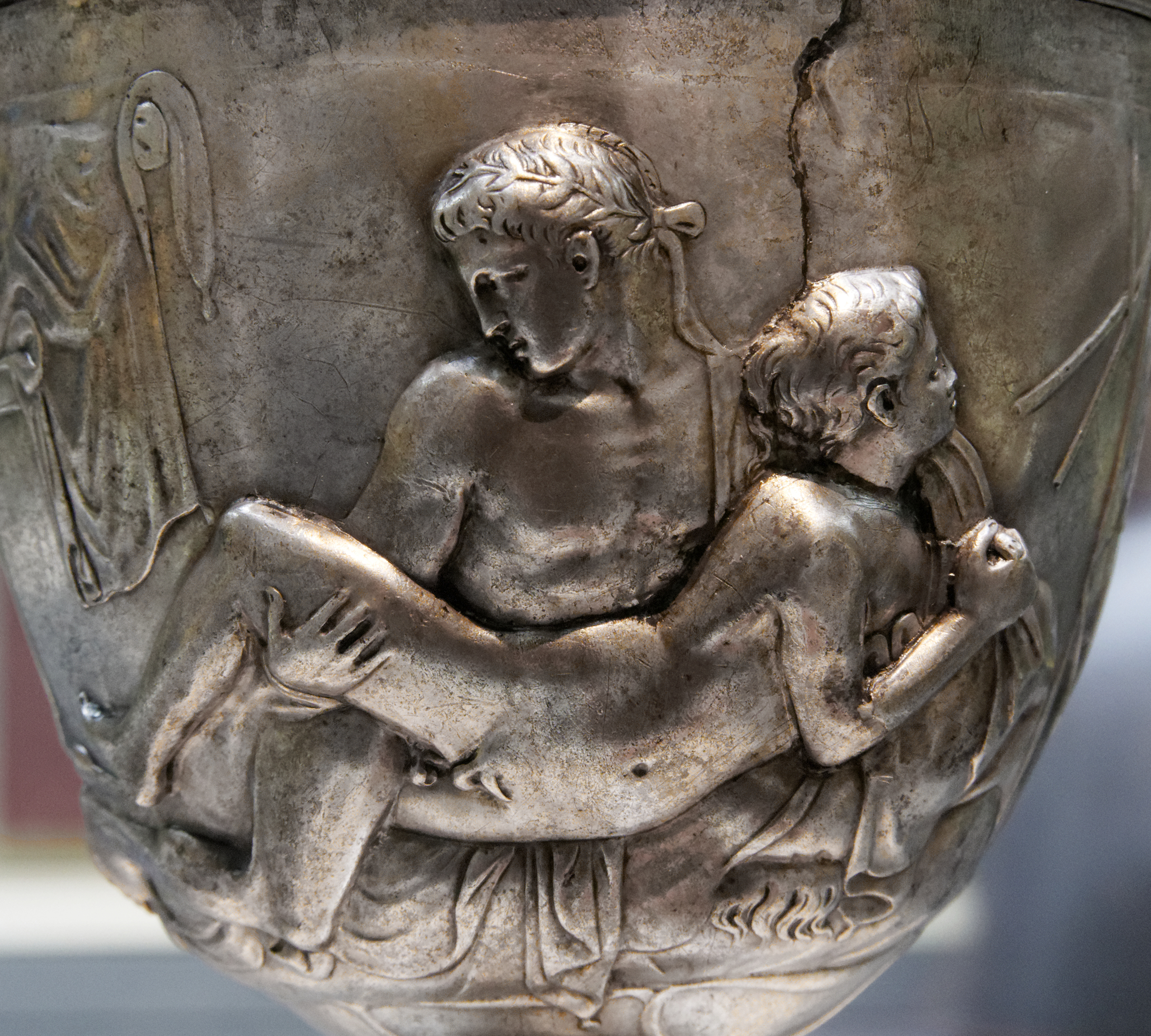
The Roman Warren Cup, silver repoussé work

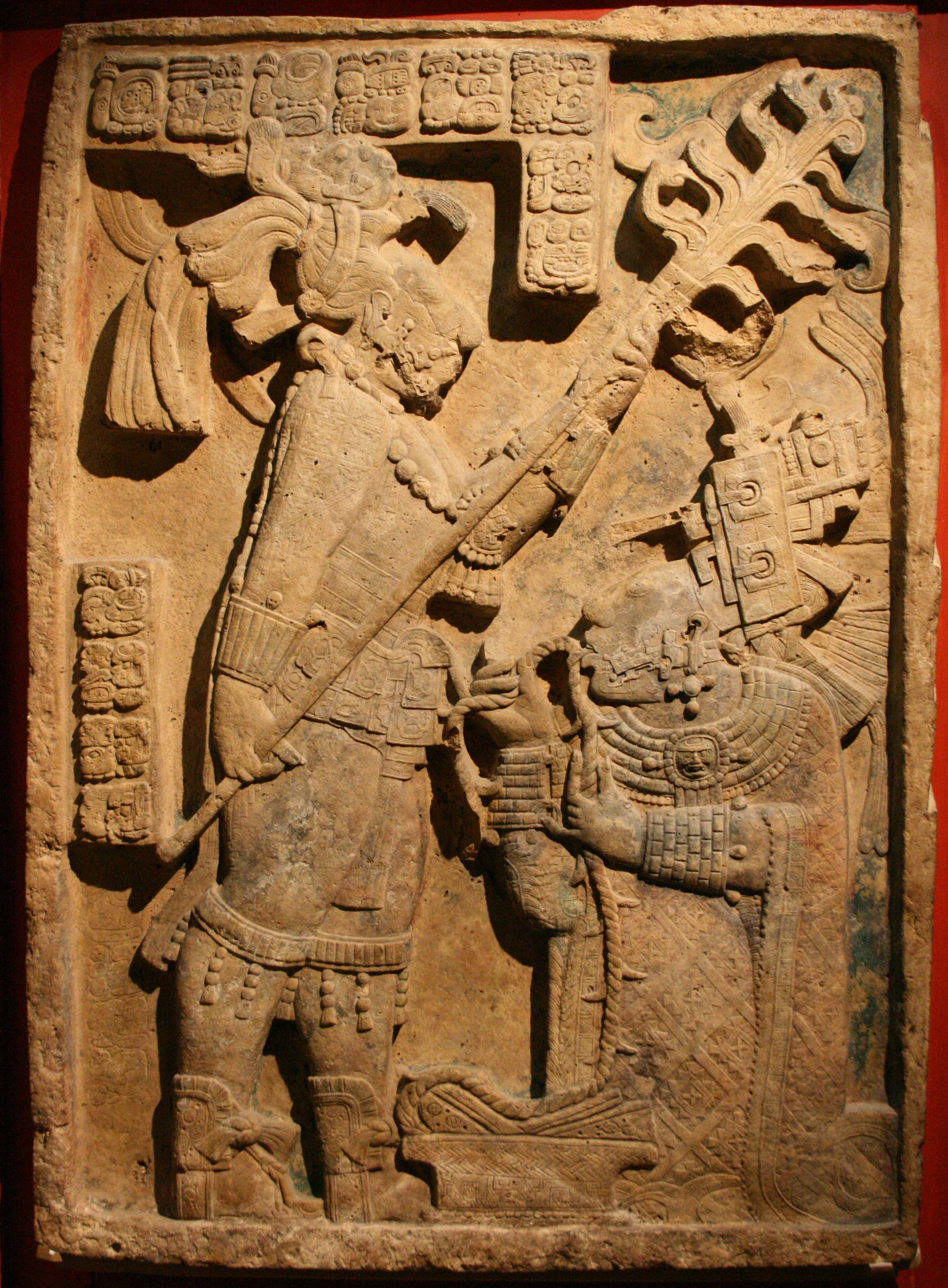
Lintel 24 from the Maya site of Yaxchilan. It depicts a bloodletting ritual performed by Lady Xoc.

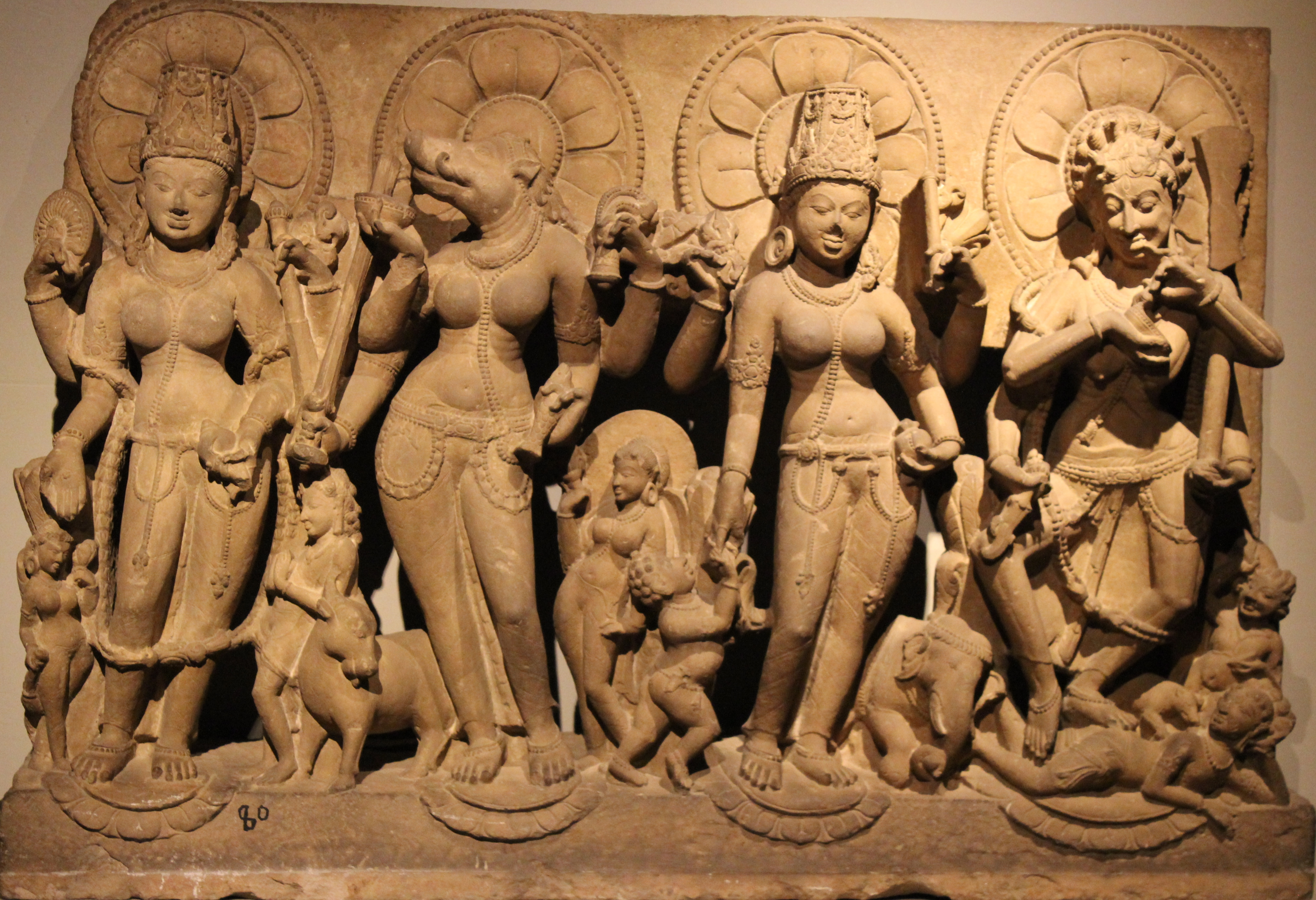
Hindu goddesses, with the background only present at top and bottom. National Museum of India

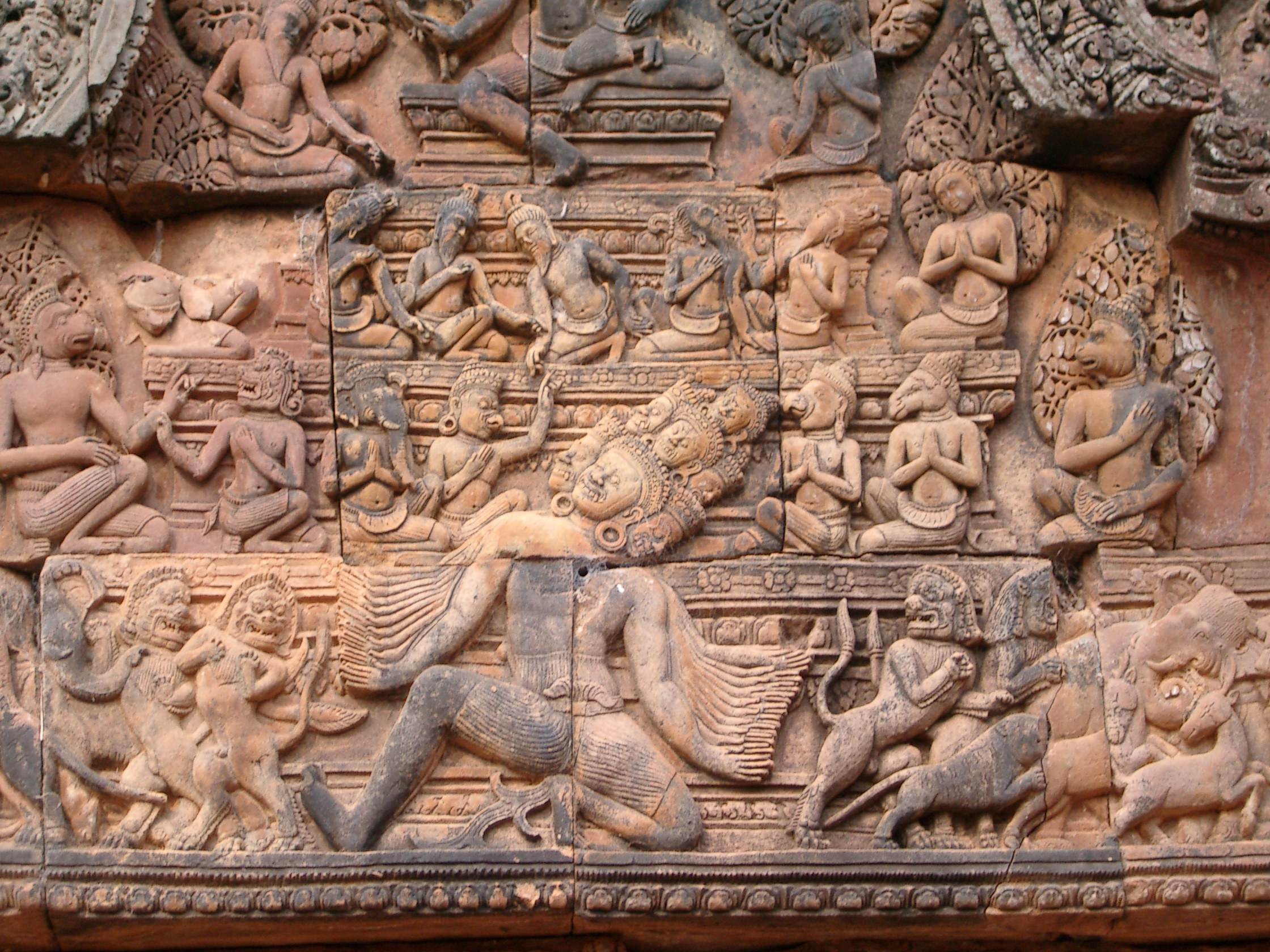
Low relief, Banteay Srei, Cambodia; Ravana shaking Mount Kailasa, the Abode of Siva

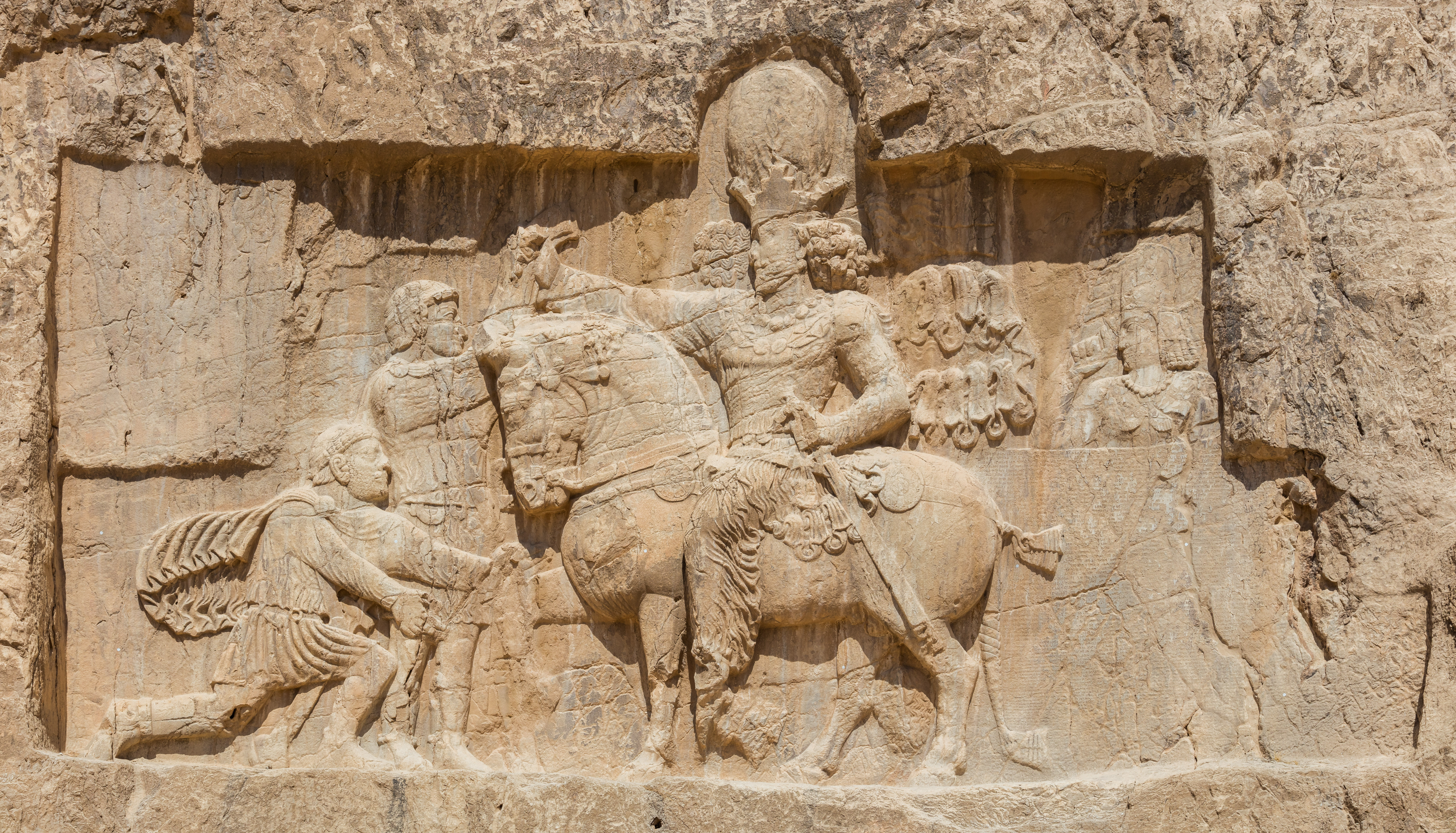
Rock relief at Naqsh-e Rustam; the Persian Sassanian emperor Shapur I (on horseback) with Roman emperors submitting to him

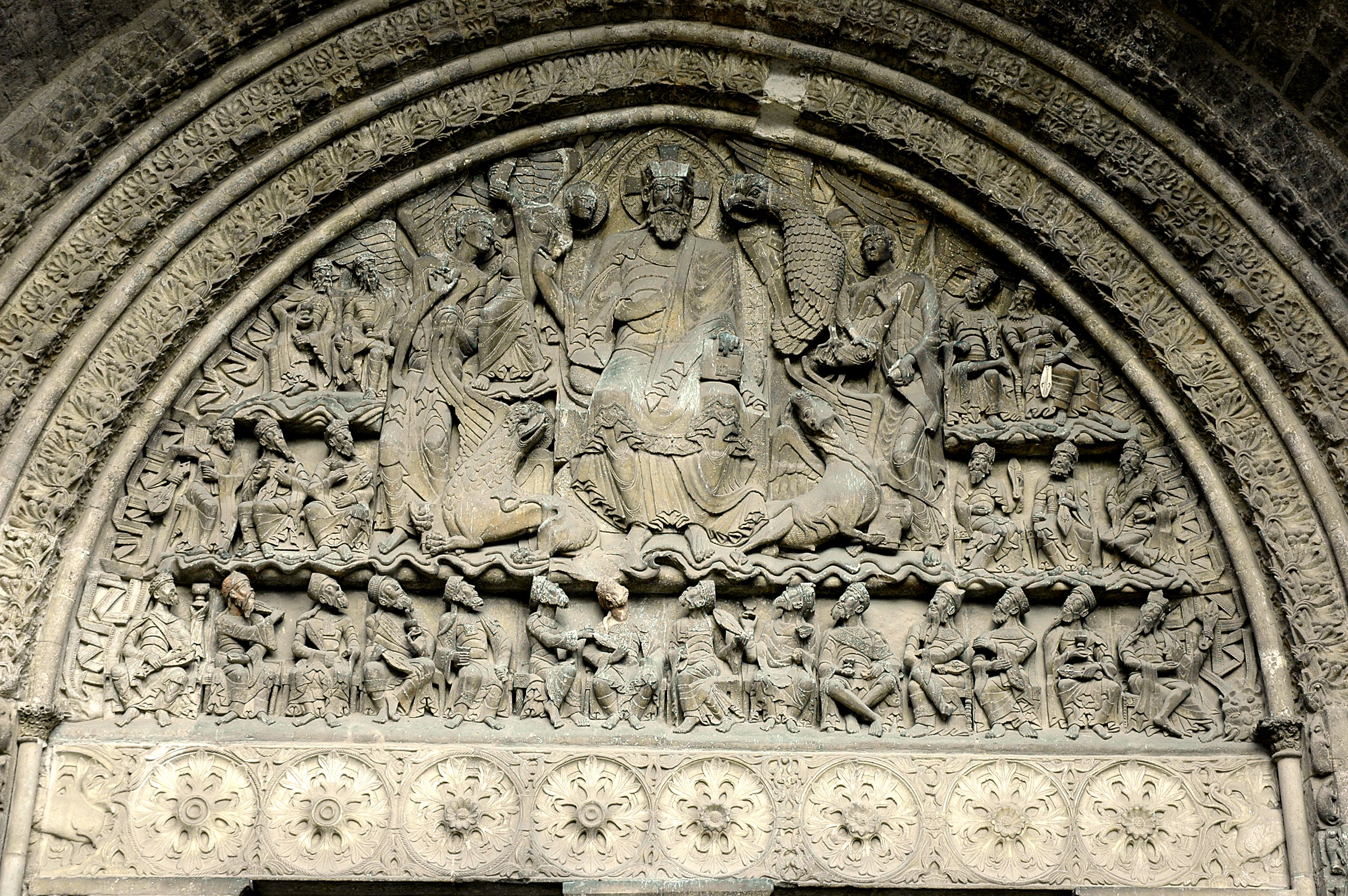
The 12th century Romanesque portal of Christ in Majesty at Moissac Abbey moves between low and high relief in a single figure.

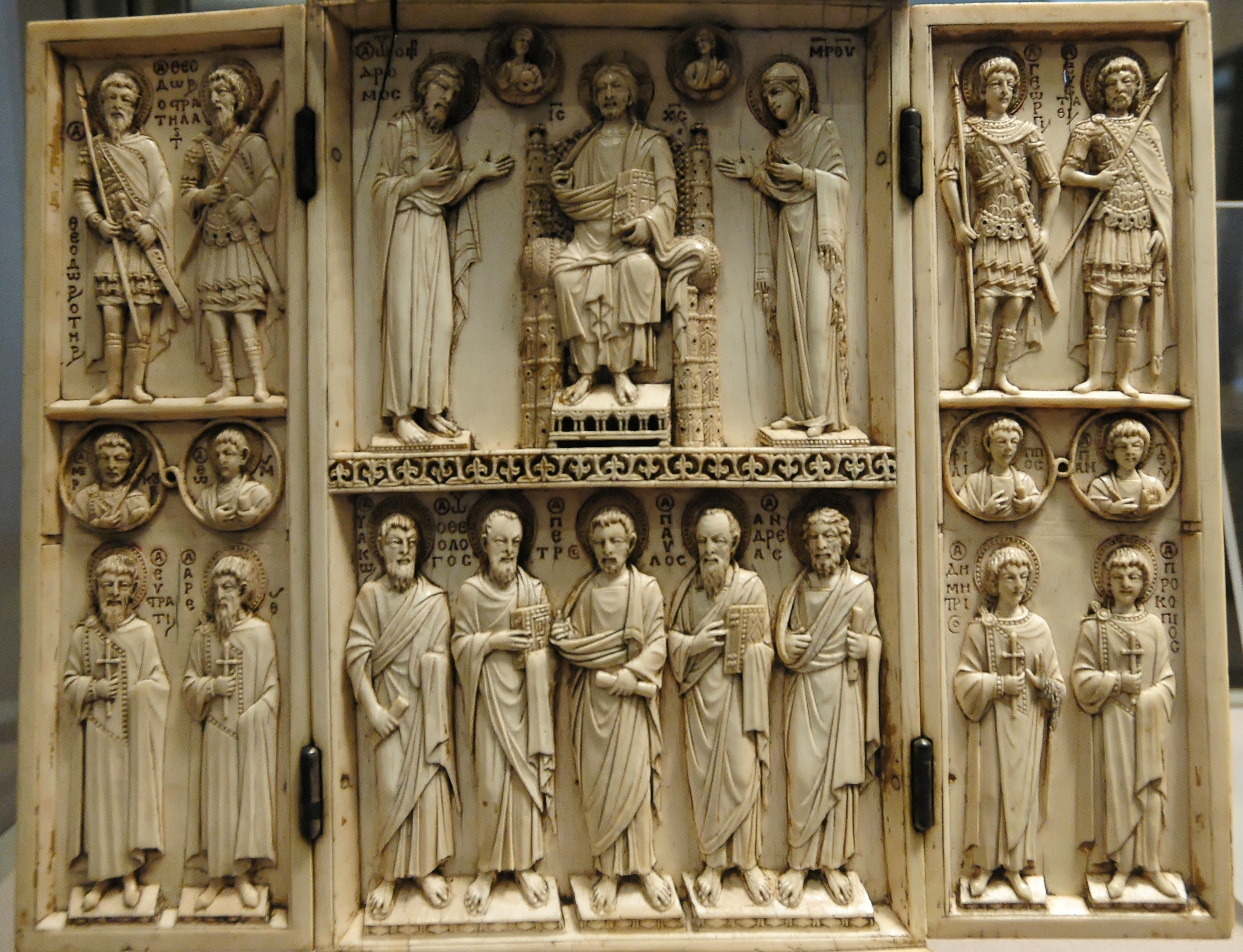
Harbaville Triptych, Byzantine ivory

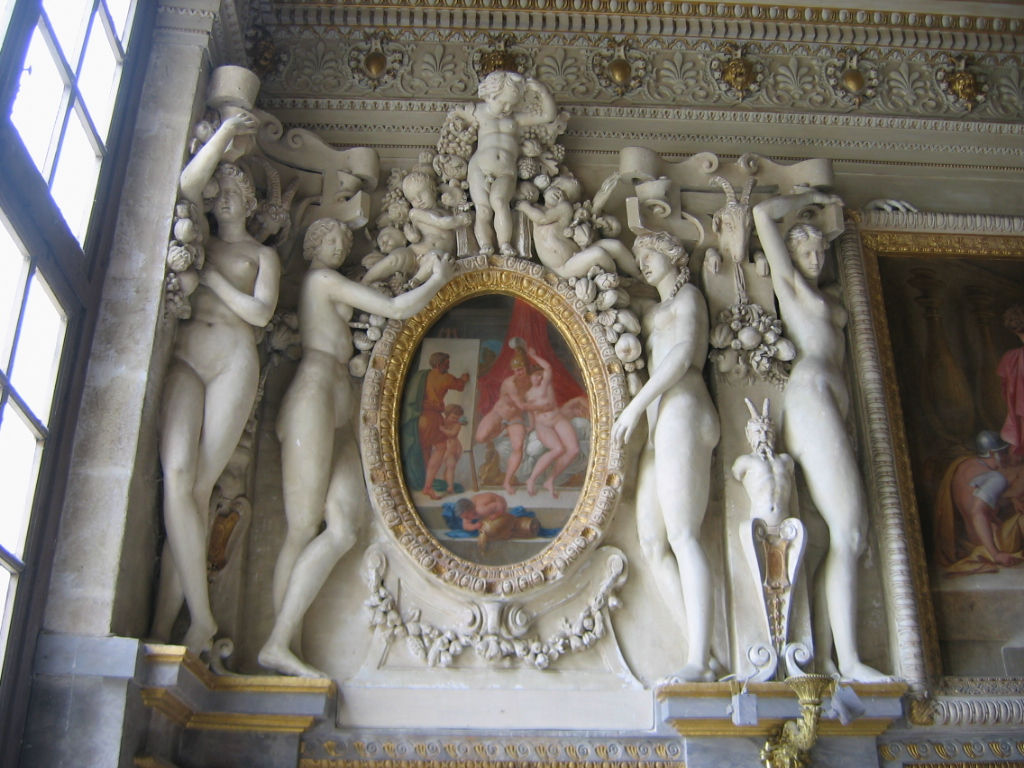
The elaborate stucco (plaster) reliefs decorating the Chateau de Fontainebleau were hugely influential. Low-relief decorative frieze above.

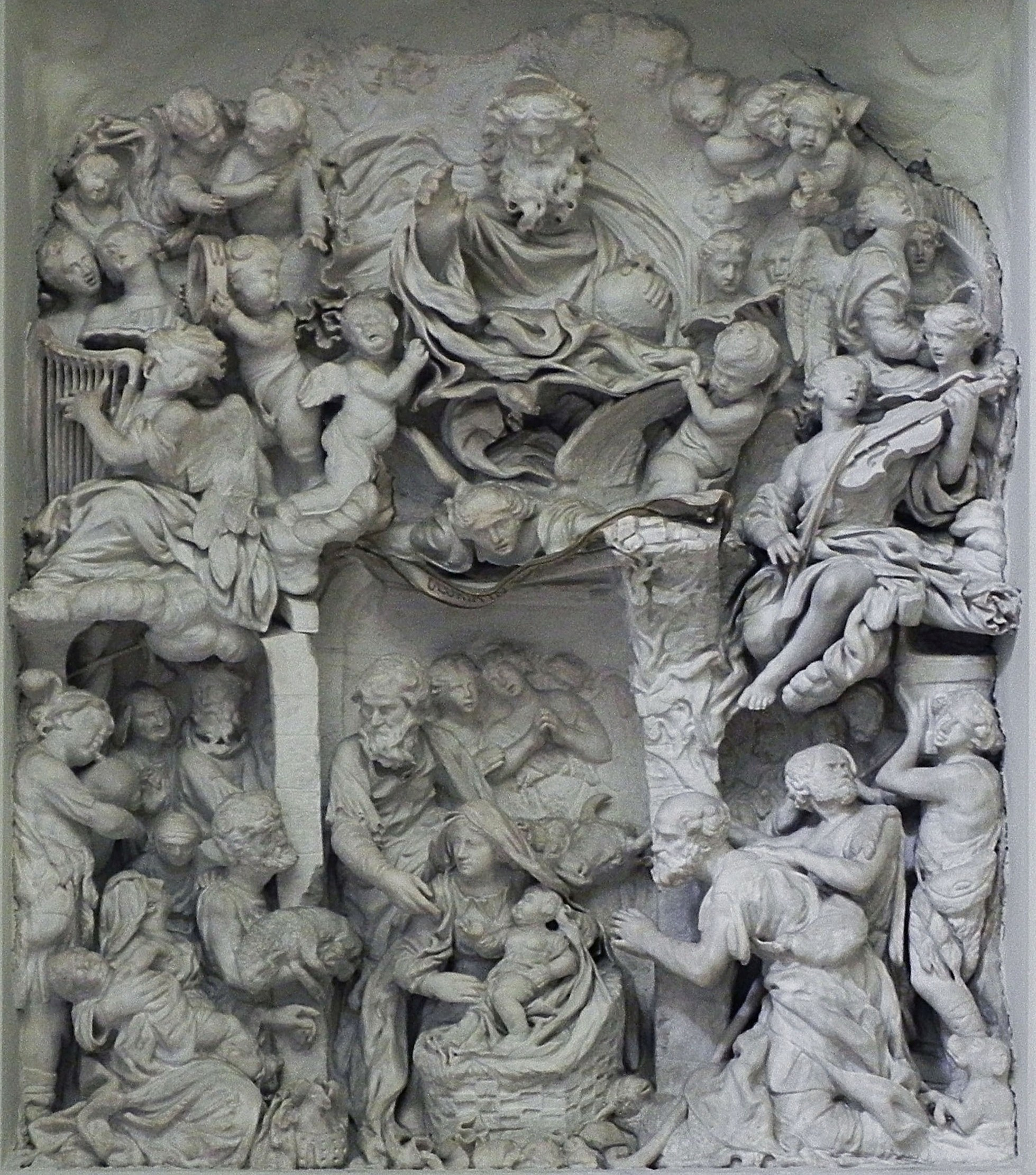
Baroque marble high-relief by Francesco Grassia, 1670, Rome

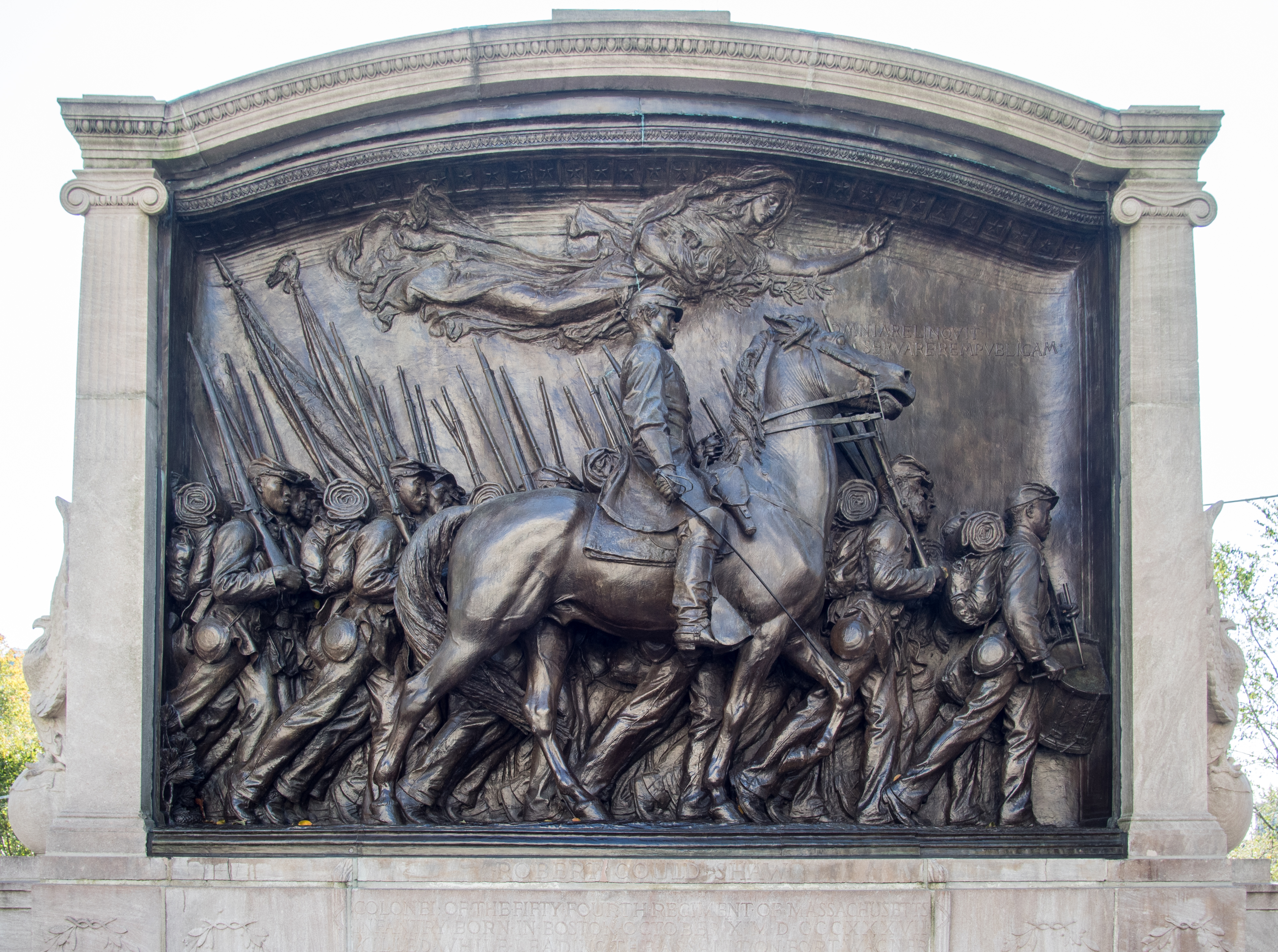
Robert Gould Shaw Memorial, 1897, Boston, combining free-standing elements with high and low relief

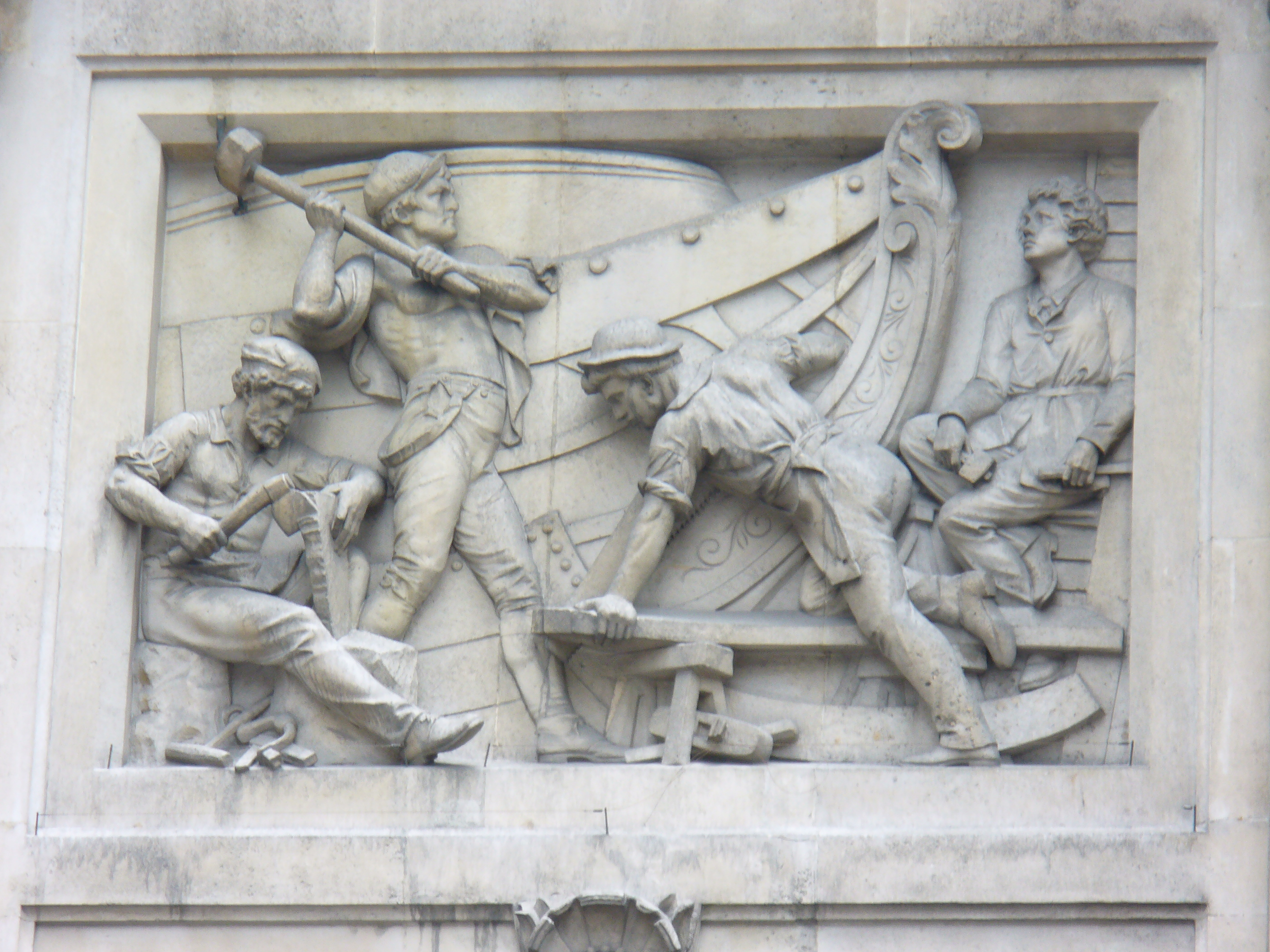
A relatively modern high relief (depicting shipbuilding) in Bishopsgate, London. Some elements jut out of the frame of the image.

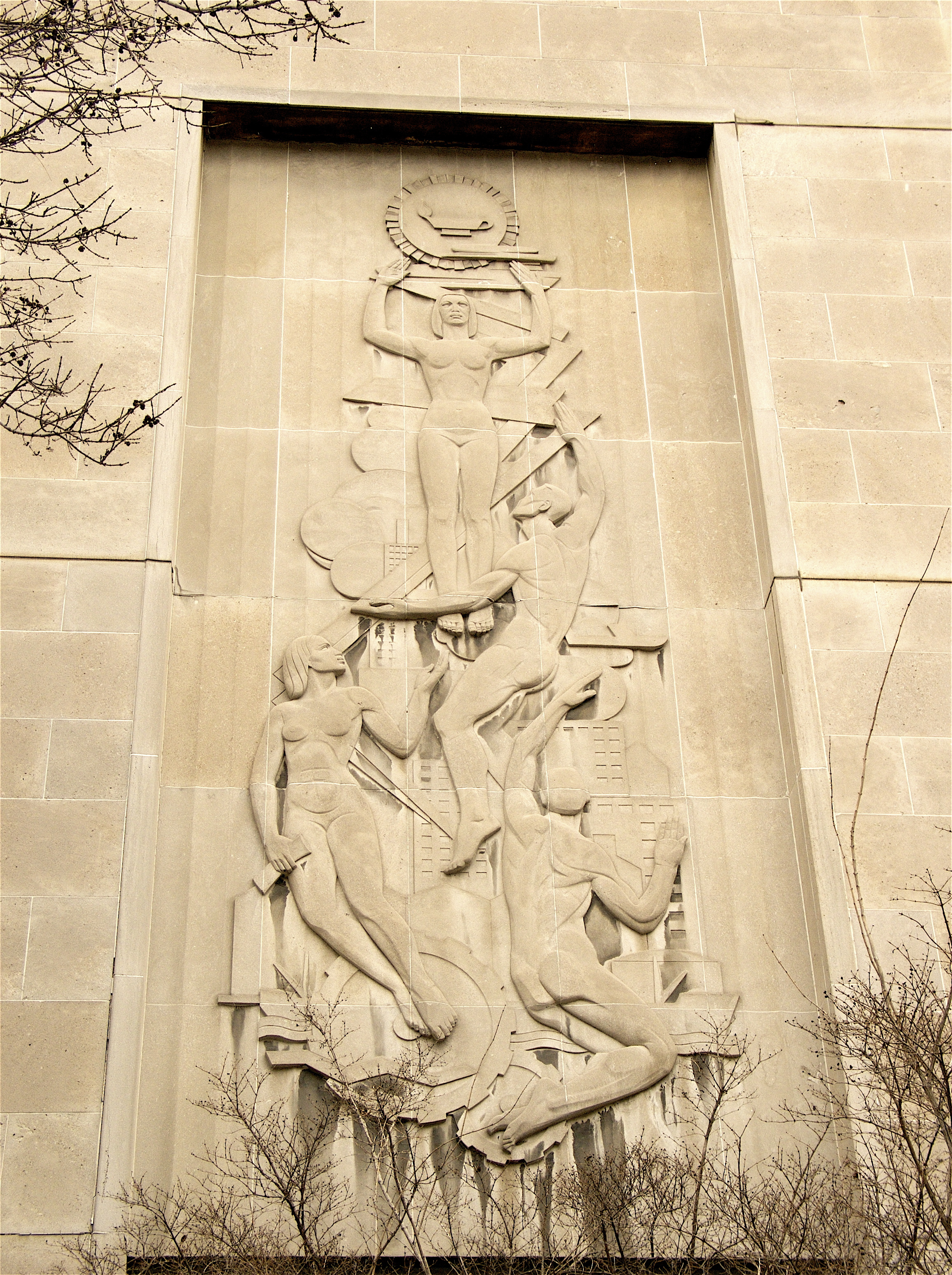
Elizabeth Wyn Wood's Bas-relief at Toronto Metropolitan University in Toronto

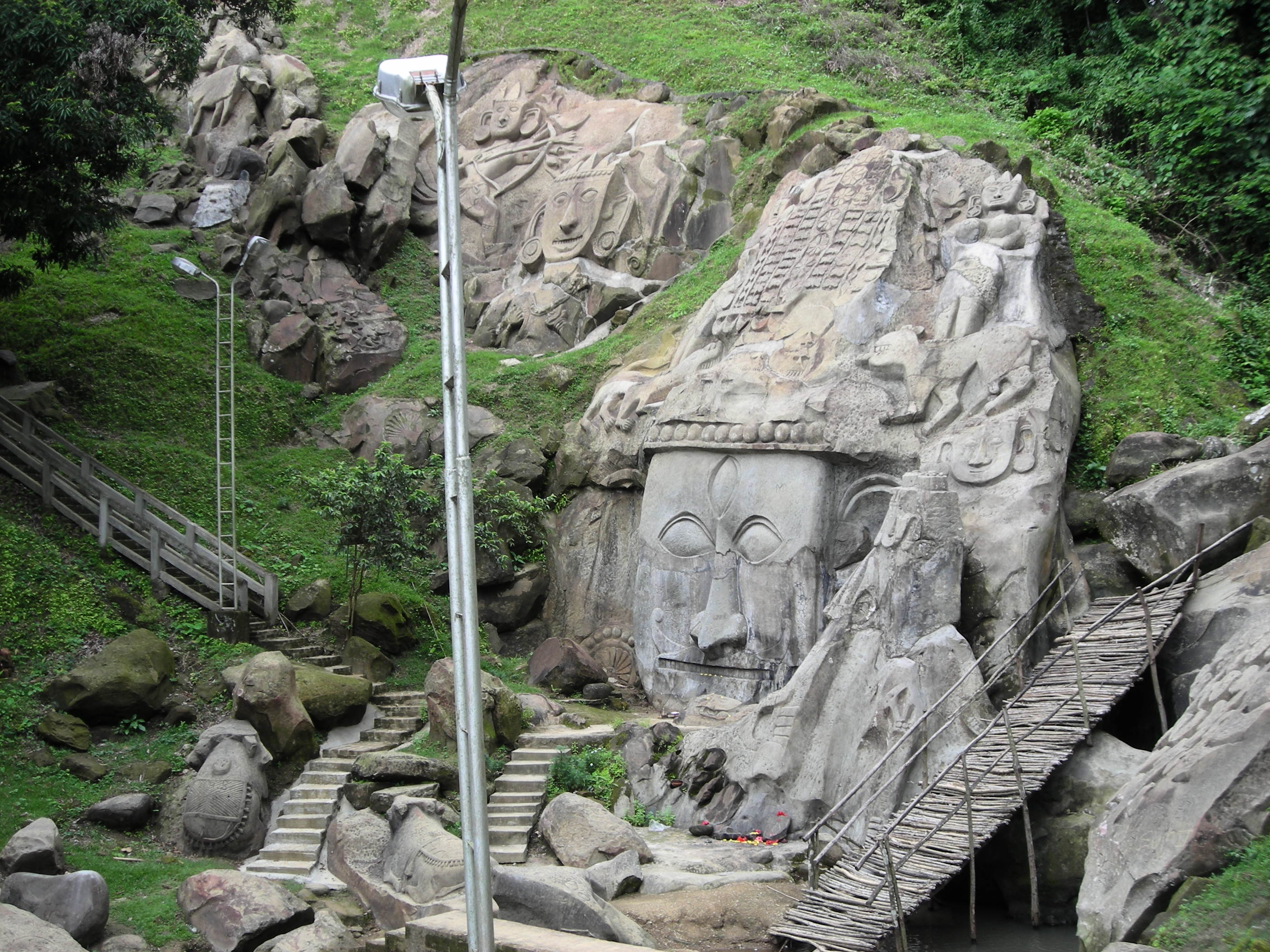
Colossal Hindu rock reliefs at Unakoti, Tripura, India

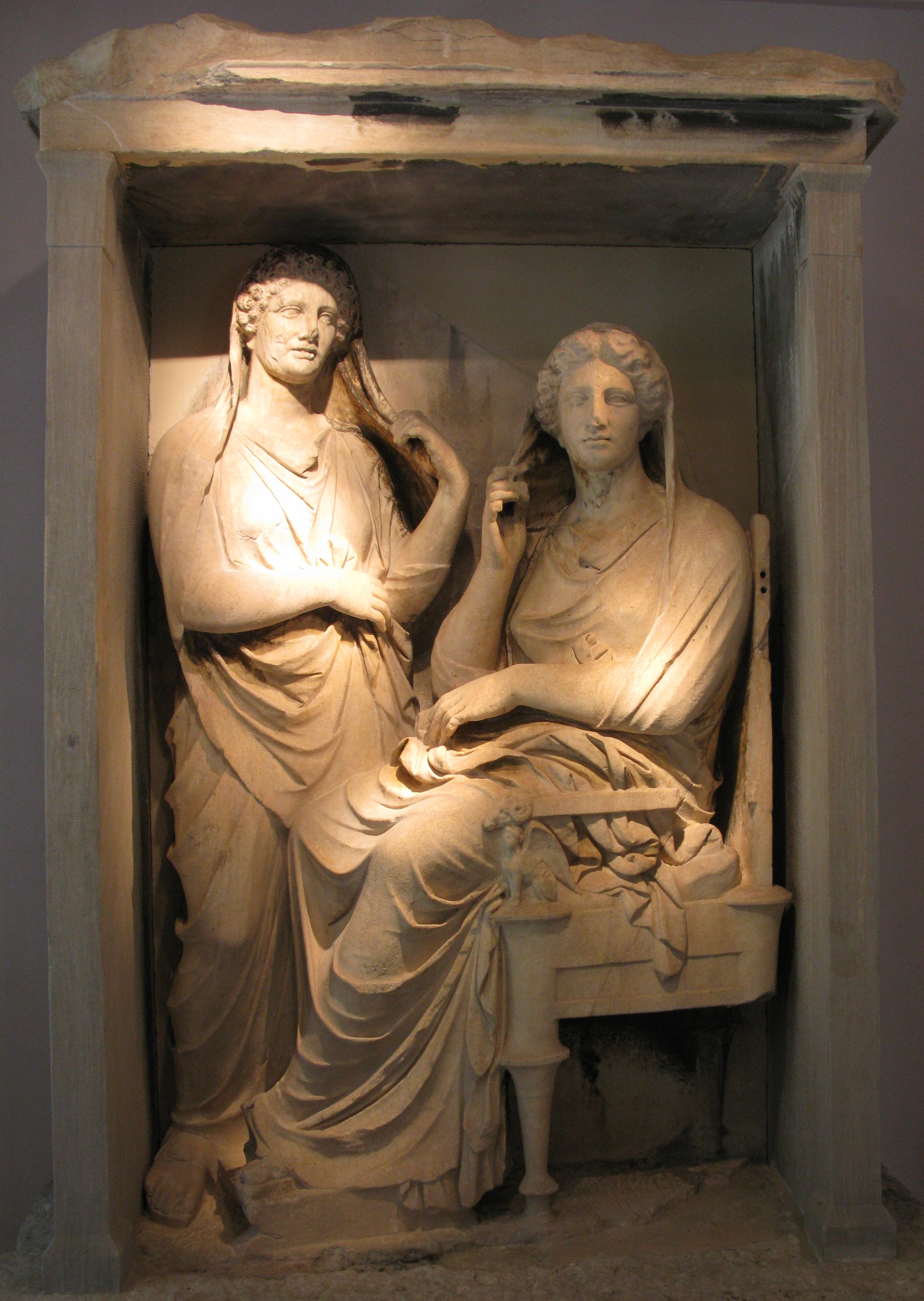
High relief of Demetria and Pamphile. Many details are detached entirely.

== Reliefs by modern artists ==
Many modern and contemporary artists such as Paul Gauguin, Ernst Barlach, Ernst Ludwig Kirchner, Pablo Picasso, Eric Gill, Jacob Epstein, Henry Moore, Claudia Cobizev, up to Ewald Matare have created reliefs.

In particular low reliefs were often used in the 20th century on the outsides of buildings, where they are relatively easy to incorporate into the architecture as decorative highlights.

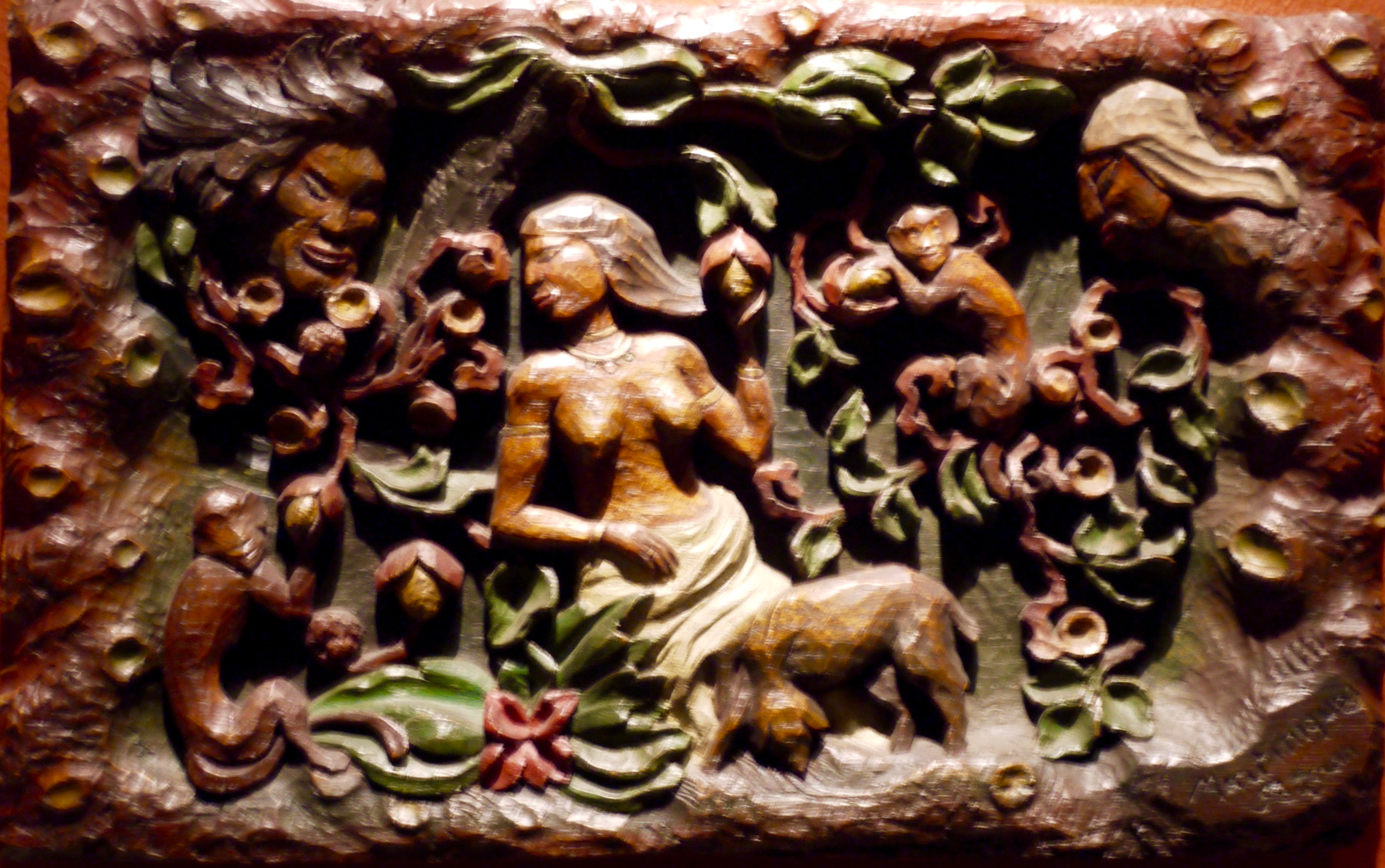
Paul Gauguin, Woman with Mango Fruits, 1889, painted oak, Ny Carlsberg Glyptotek, Kopenhagen

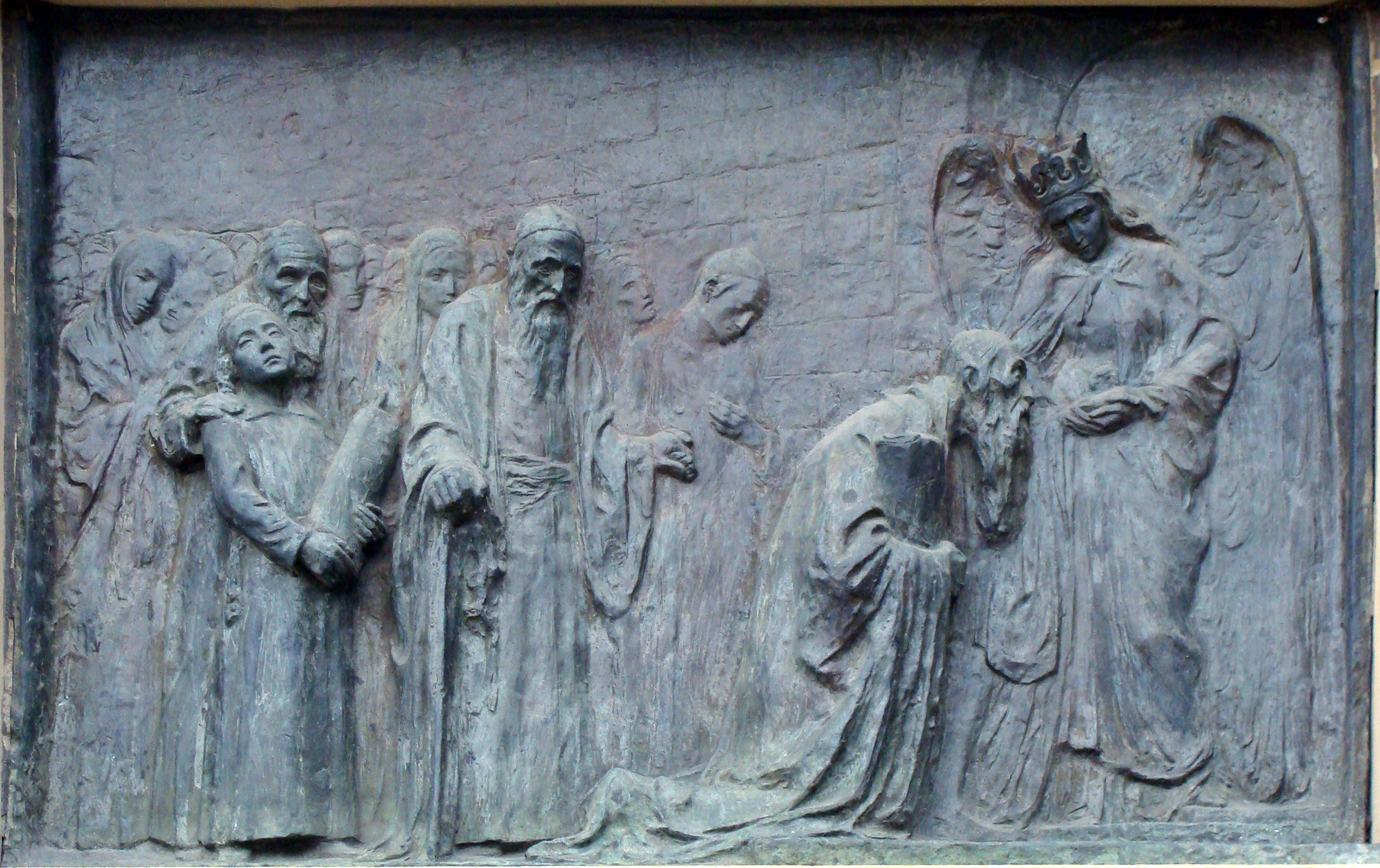
The Admission of Jews to Poland in the Middle Ages by Henryk Hochman, 1907

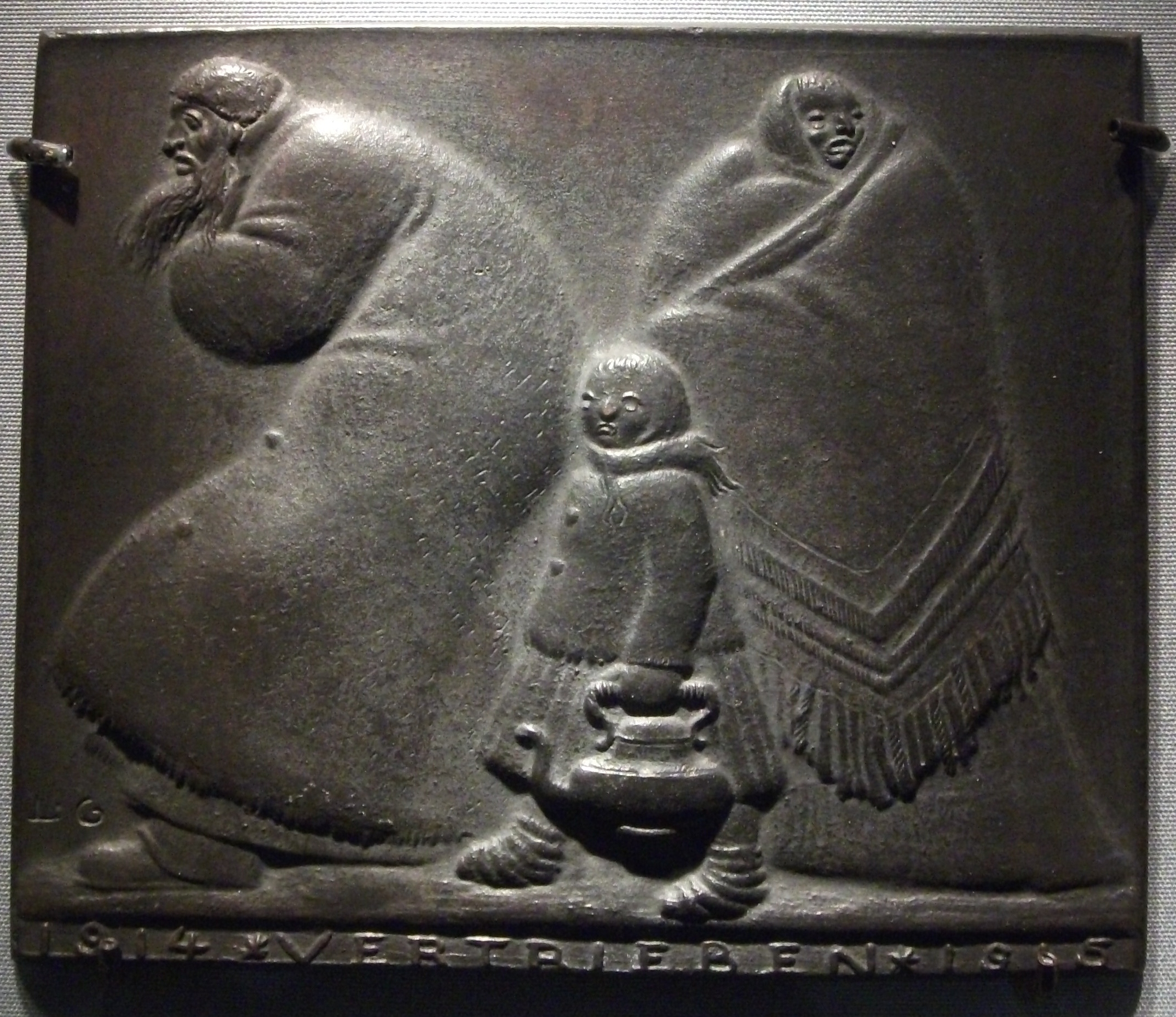
Ludwig Gies, cast iron plaquette, 8 x 9.8 cm, inscribed "1914·VERTRIEBEN·1915" = "Refugees 1914–1915"

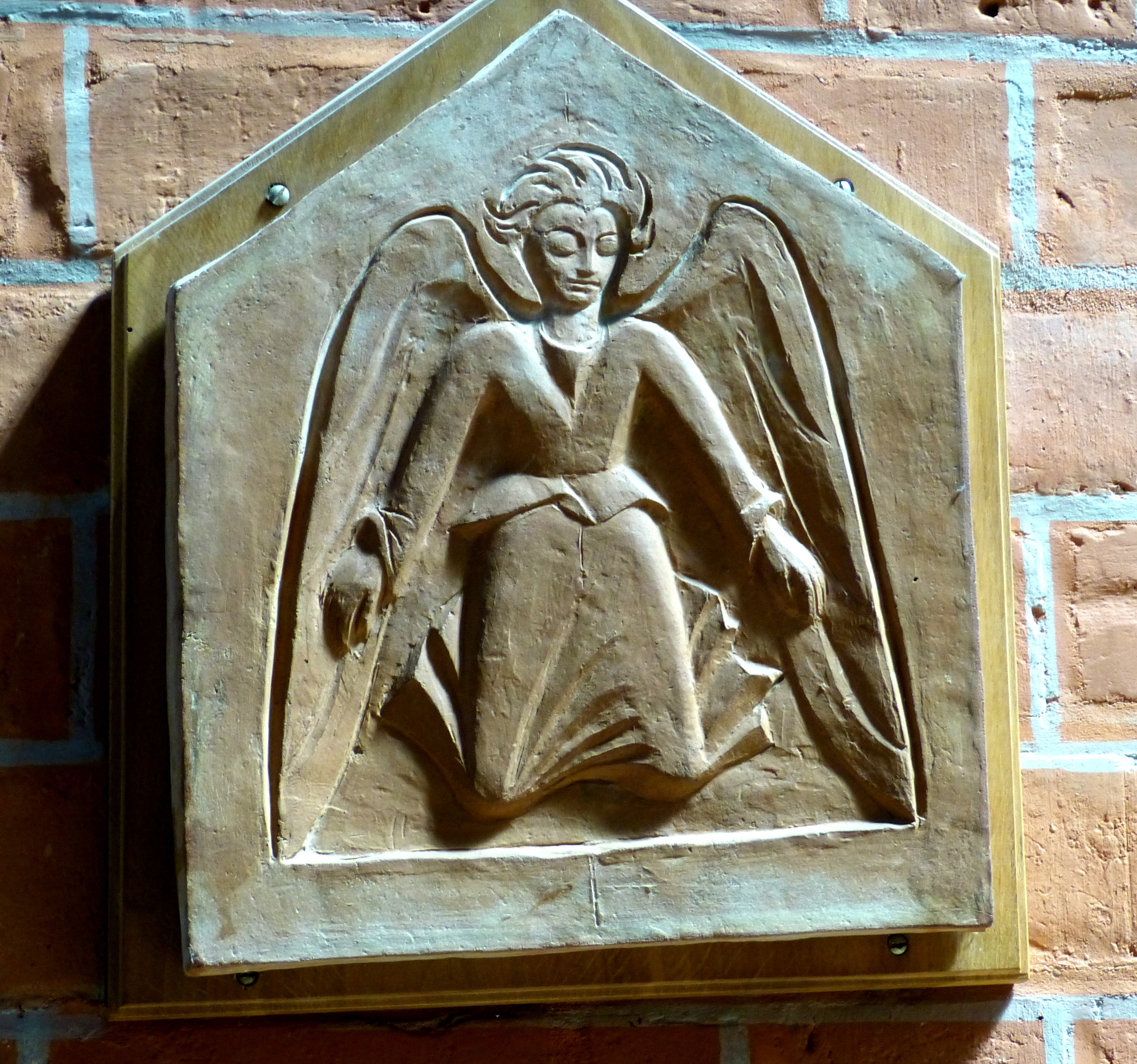
Ernst Barlach, Angel of Hope, 1933, Saint Mary parish church in Güstrow

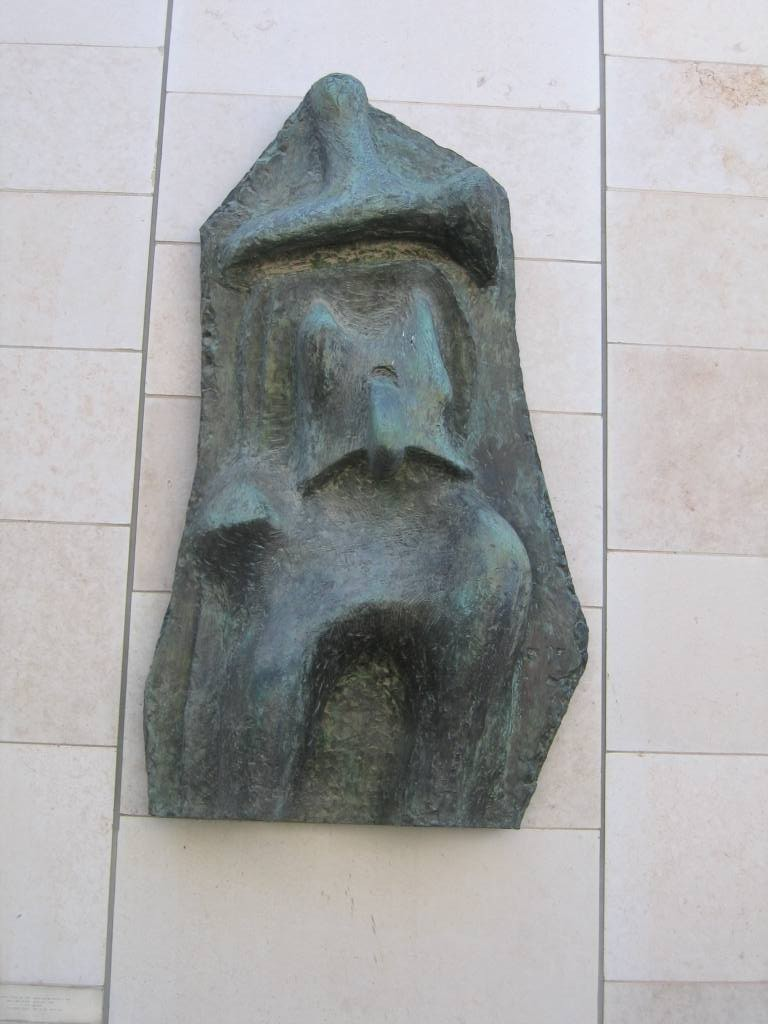
Henry Moore, Relief No. 1, 1959, Bronze, at the Israel Museum, Jerusalem

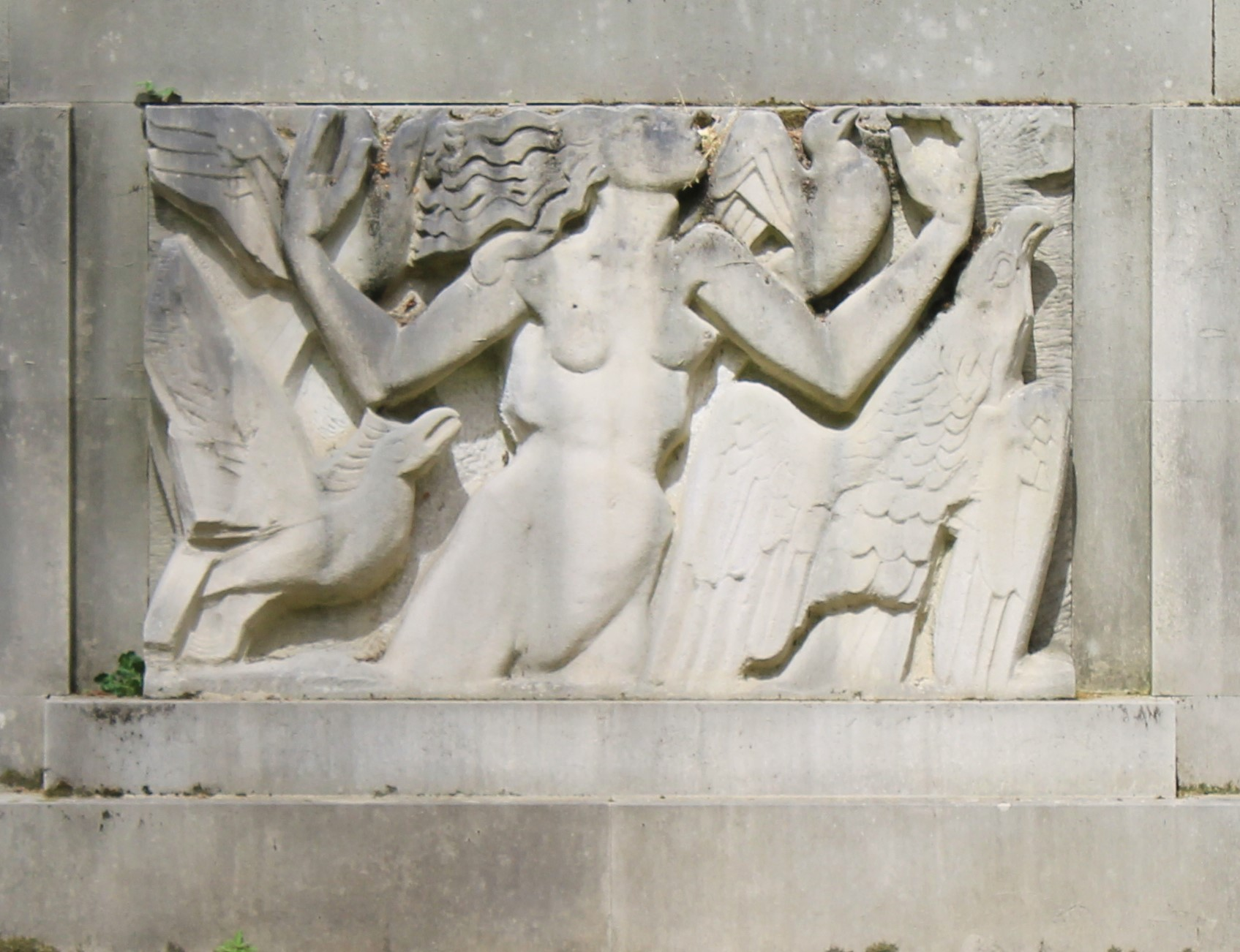
William Henry Hudson memorial, Hyde Park, London, Jacob Epstein

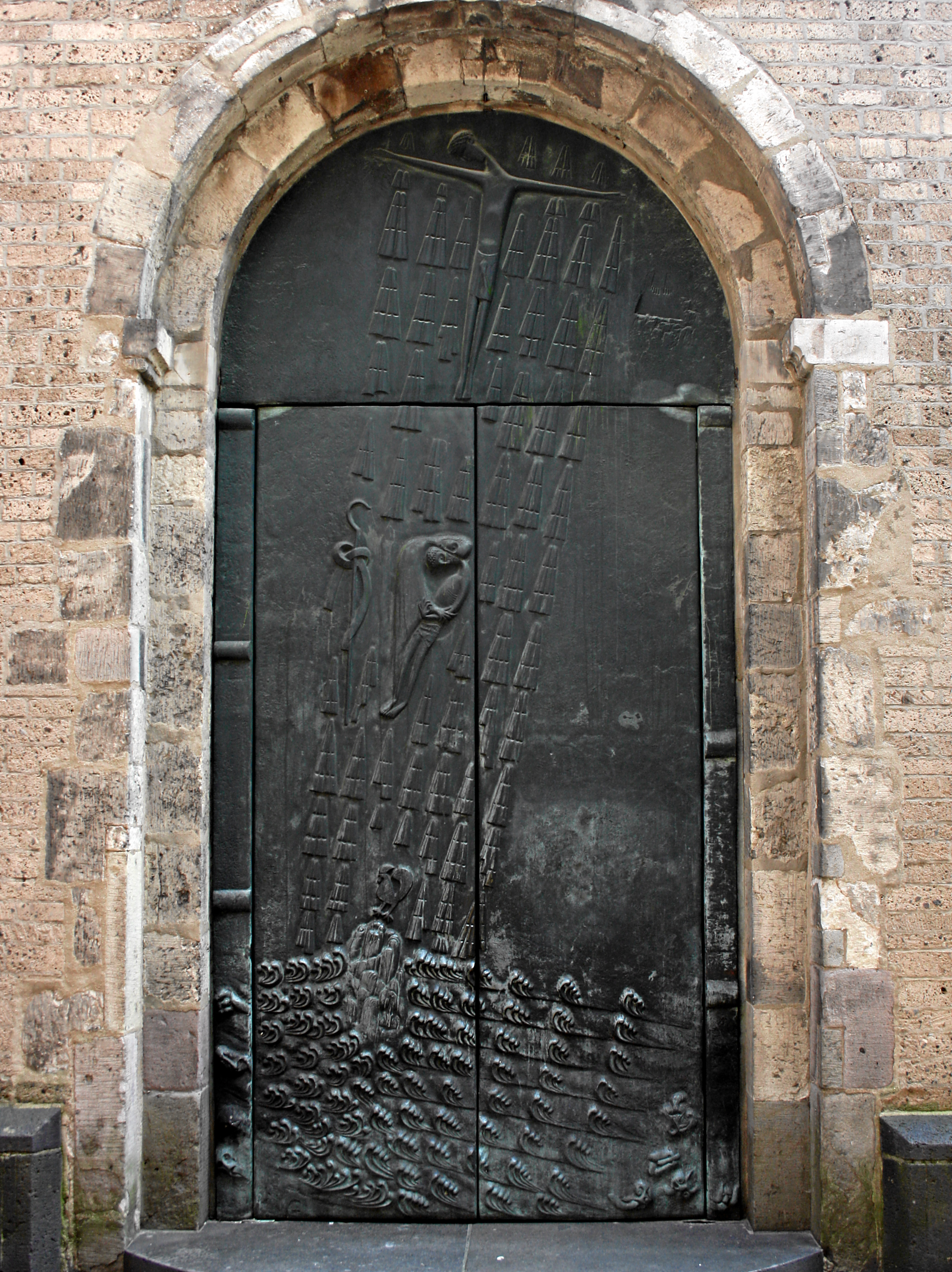
Ewald Matare, main portal with bronze door, 1958–1960, St Lambertus, Düsseldorf

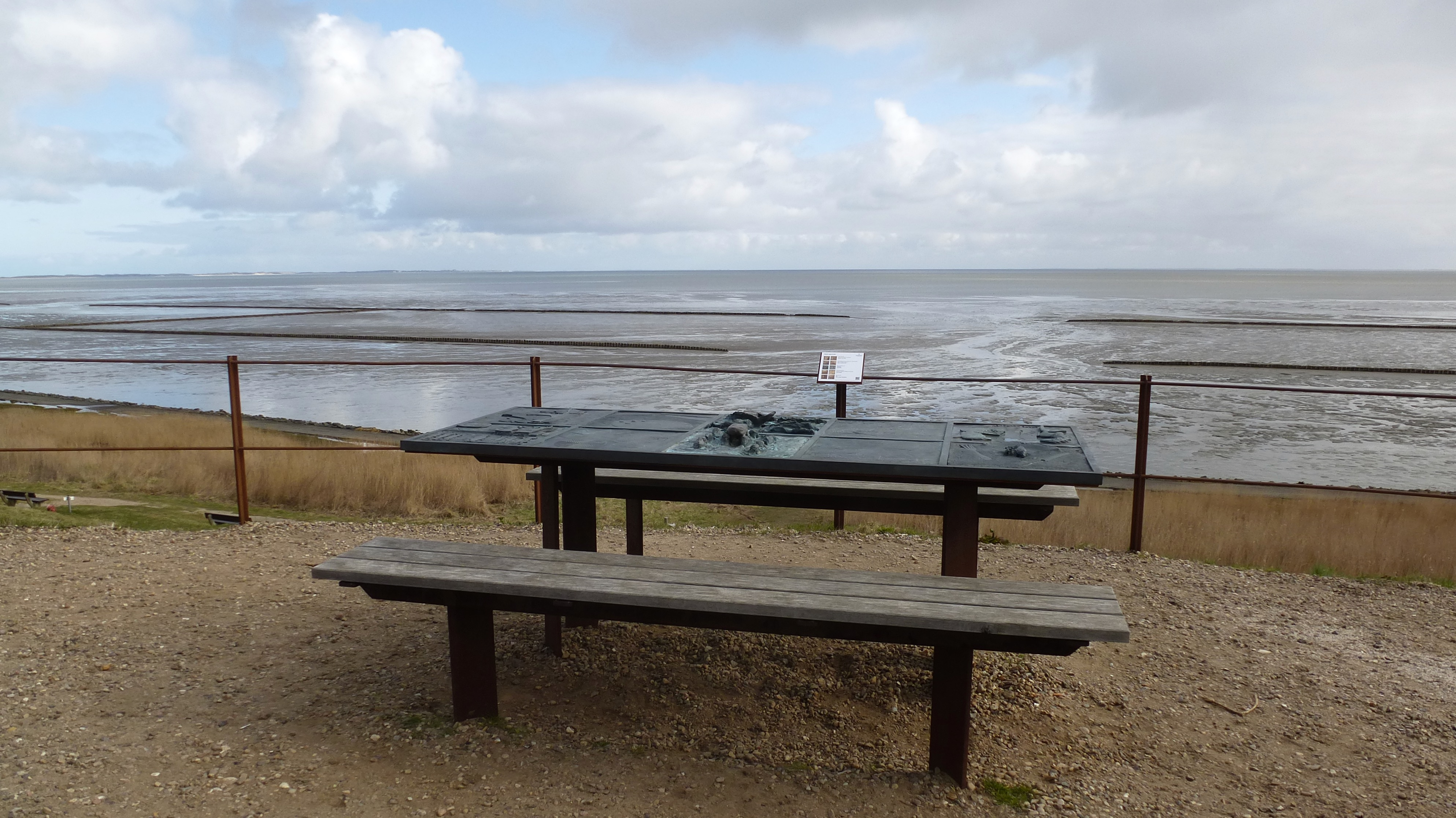
Table at the Cliff, Keitum, Sylt, 2019

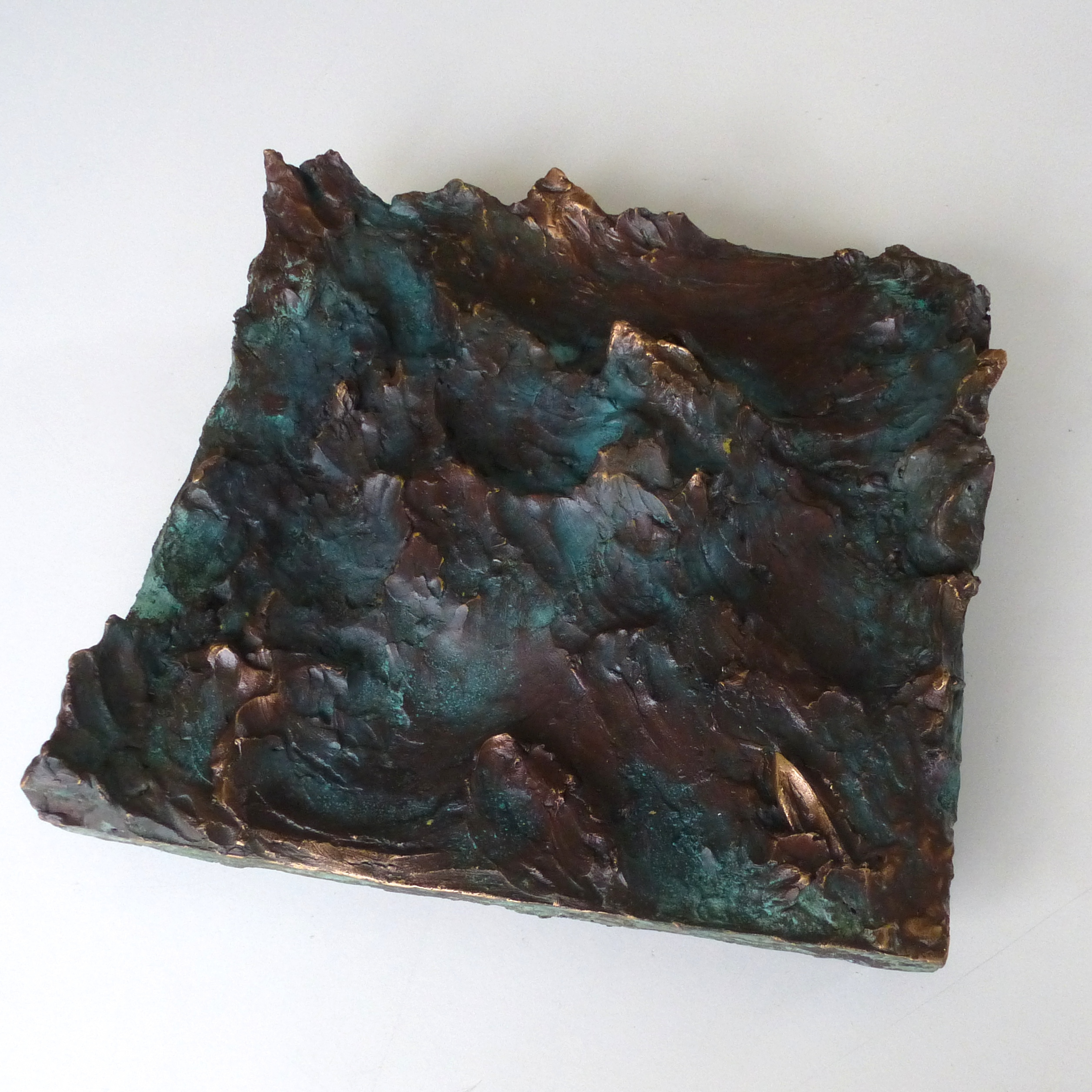
Boat in moving sea, bronze relief by Ingo Kühl, 2019

== Notable reliefs ==
Notable examples of monumental reliefs include:

- Ancient Egypt: Most Egyptian temples, e.g. the Temple of Karnak
- Assyria: A famous collection is in the British Museum, Black Obelisk of Shalmaneser III
- Ancient Persia: Persepolis, and rock-face reliefs at Naqsh-e Rustam and Naqsh-e Rajab
- Ancient Greece: The Parthenon Marbles, Bassae Frieze, Great Altar of Pergamon, Ludovisi Throne
- Mesopotamia: Ishtar Gate of Babylon
- Ancient Rome: Ara Pacis, Trajan's Column, Column of Marcus Aurelius, triumphal arches, Portonaccio sarcophagus
- Medieval Europe: Many cathedrals and other churches, such as Chartres Cathedral and Bourges Cathedral
- India: Sanchi, base of the Lion Capital of Asoka, the rock-cut Elephanta Caves and Ellora Caves, Khajuraho temples, Mahabalipuram with the Descent of the Ganges, and many South Indian temples, Unakoti group of sculptures (bas-relief) at Kailashahar, Unakoti District, Tripura
- South-East Asia: Borobodur in Java, Indonesia, Angkor Wat in Cambodia
- Glyphs, Mayan stelae and other reliefs of the Maya and Aztec civilizations
- United States: Stone Mountain, Robert Gould Shaw Memorial, Boston, Mount Rushmore National Memorial
- UK: Base panels of Nelson's Column, Frieze of Parnassus

Smaller-scale reliefs:

- Ivory: Nimrud ivories from much of the Near East, Late Antique Consular diptychs, the Byzantine Harbaville Triptych and Veroli Casket, the Anglo-Saxon Franks Casket, Cloisters Cross
- Silver: Warren Cup, Gundestrup cauldron, Mildenhall Treasure, Berthouville Treasure, Missorium of Theodosius I, Lomellini Ewer and Basin.
- Gold: Berlin Gold Hat, Bimaran casket, Panagyurishte Treasure
- Glass: Portland Vase, Lycurgus Cup

== See also ==
- Bellows (ornament)
- Rock relief
- Multidimensional art
- Pargetting – English exterior plaster reliefs
- Relief printing – a different concept
- Repoussé and chasing – a metalworking technique
- Terrain#Relief
