= Young Slave =

Sculpture by Michelangelo

- Schiavo giovane (Italian)
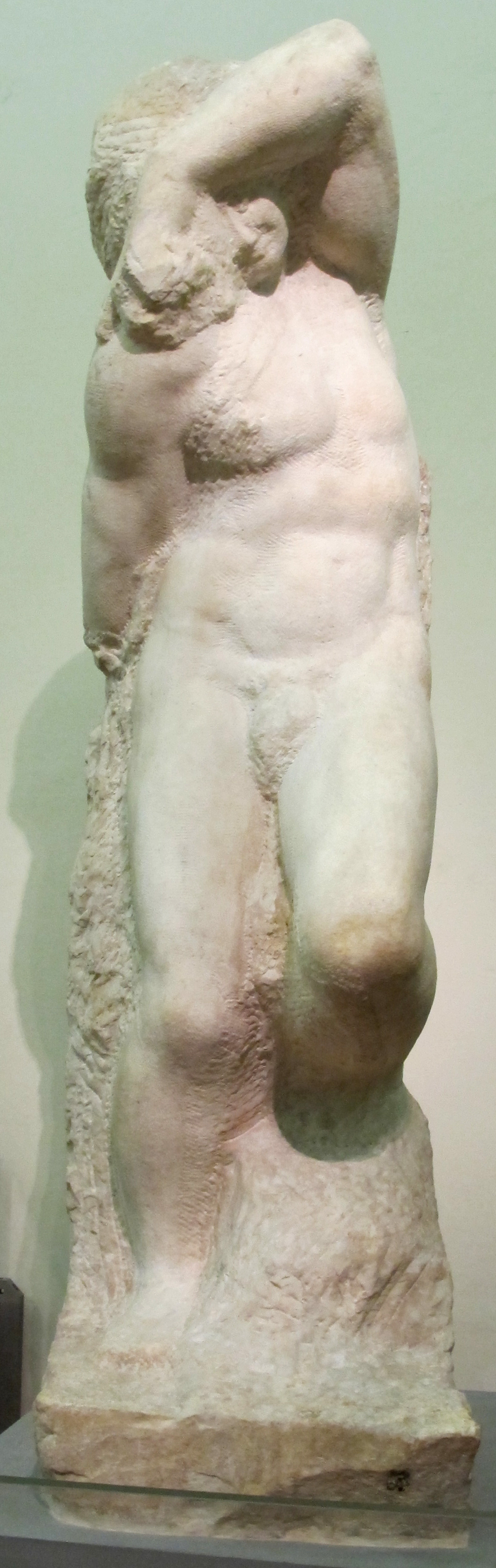
- Artist: Michelangelo
- Year: c. 1525–1530
- Type: sculpture
- Medium: marble
- Dimensions: 256 cm (101 in)
- Location: Galleria dell'Accademia; Florence
- Preceded by: Dying Slave
- Followed by: Atlas Slave

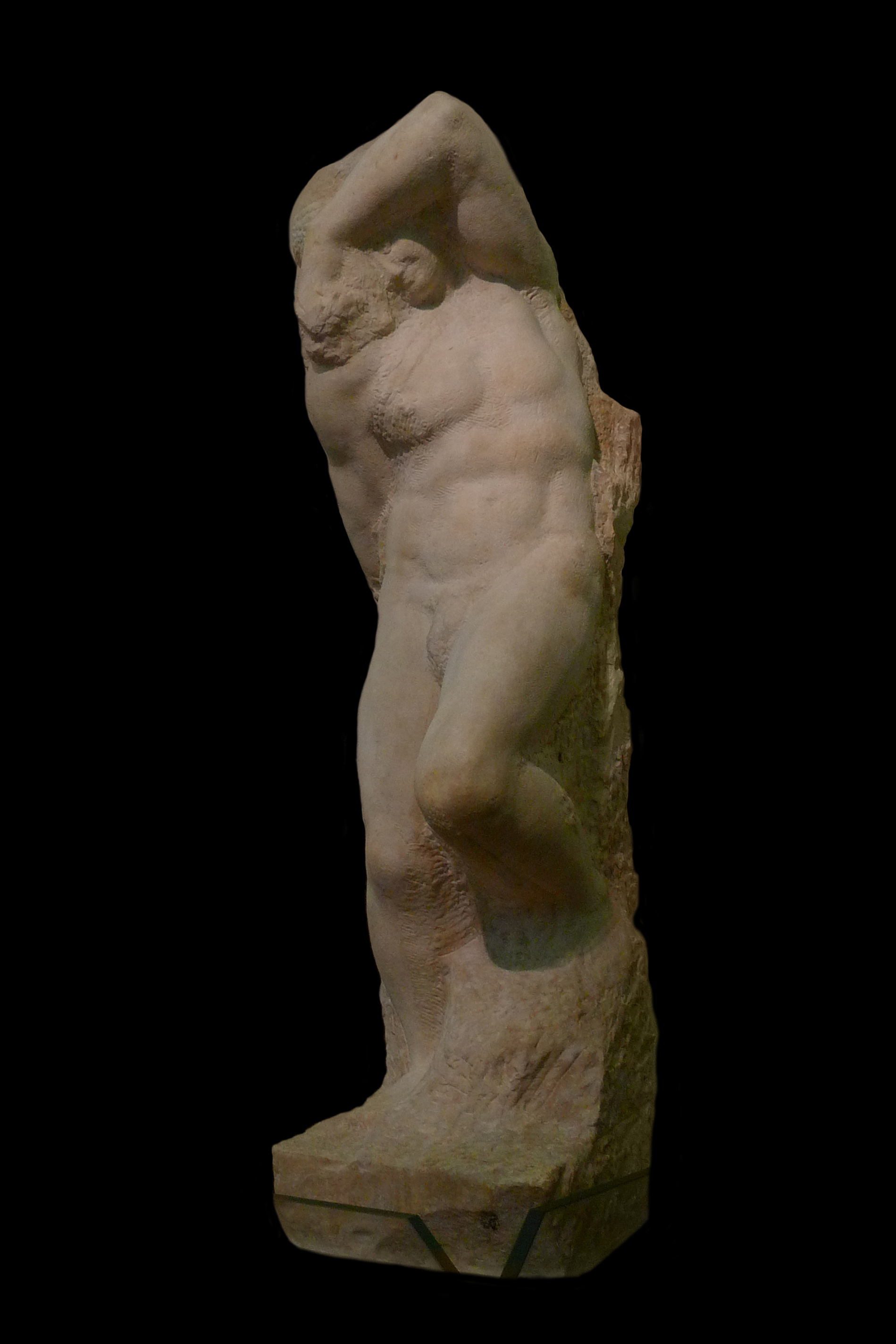
Young Slave at the Galleria dell'Accademia, Florence

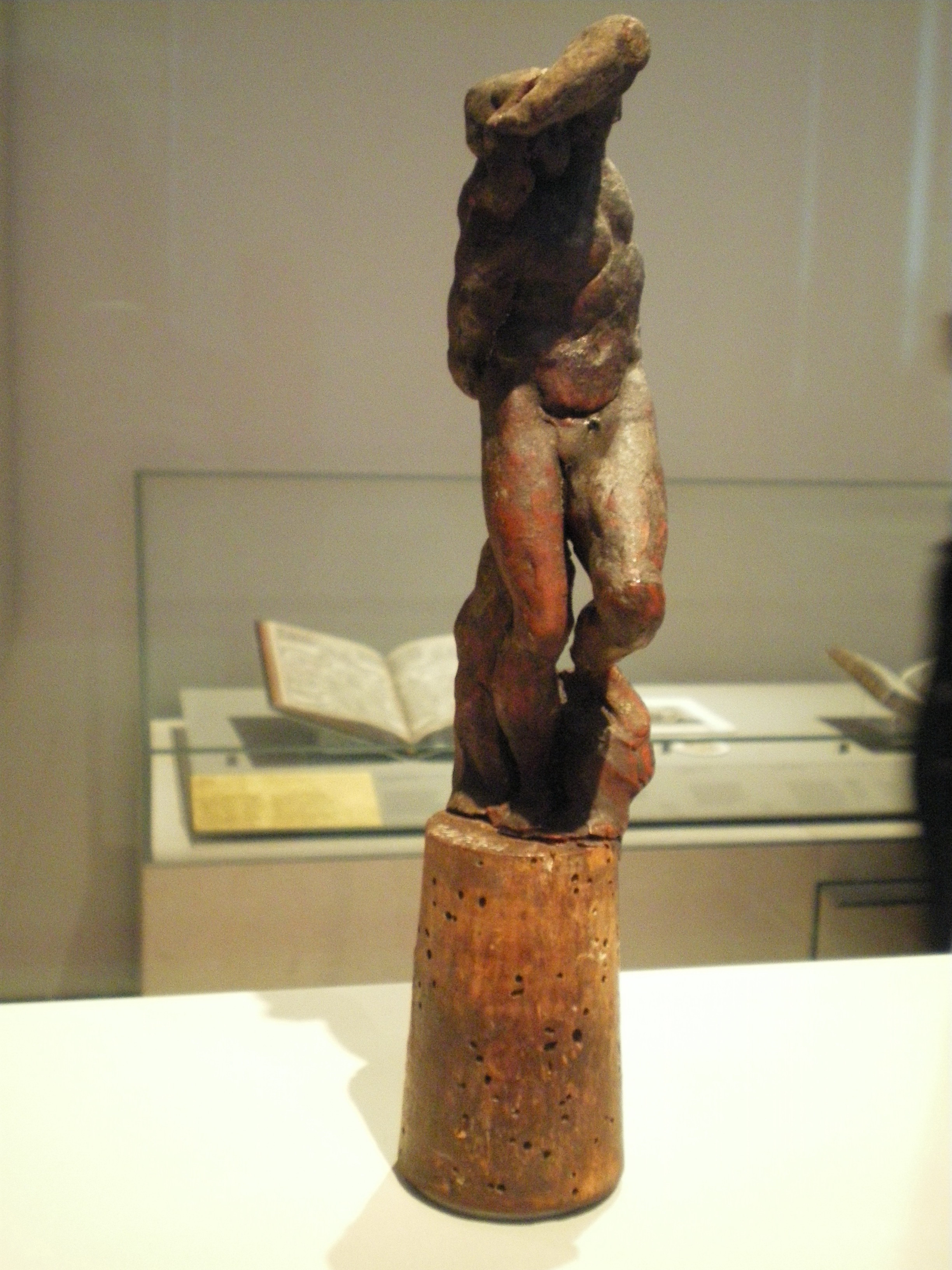
Probable bozzetto at the V&A

The Young Slave (Italian: Schiavo giovane) is a marble sculpture of Michelangelo, datable to around 1525–1530 which is conserved in the Galleria dell'Accademia in Florence. It is part of the "unfinished" series of Prigioni intended for the Tomb of Julius II.

== History ==
It seems that from the first version of the tomb of Julius II (1505) a series of "Prigioni" was planned for the lowest level of the mausoleum – a series of more-than-life-size statues of chained figures in various poses, leaning on the pilasters which framed a set of niches, each of which would contain a "winged Victory". With one on each side of each niche, it must have been initially intended for there to be sixteen or twenty Prigioni. In the course of the reductions of the project which followed, this was reduced to twelve (second project, 1513), eight (third project, 1516) and finally perhaps a mere four (fourth or fifth version, 1526 or 1532), before they were completely eliminated from the project in 1542. According to de Tolnay (1951, 1954) the Young Slave was intended for the space left of the central niche in the project of 1516.

The first examples of the series are the two Prigioni of Paris, which are mentioned in Michelangelo's letters and were named the "Slaves" (Schiavi) in the 19th century: the Dying Slave and the Rebellious Slave. They were sculpted in Rome around 1513.

The Florentine Prigioni (The Young Slave, the Bearded Slave, the Atlas Slave, and the Awakening Slave) were probably sculpted in the latter half of the 1520s, when Michelangelo was employed at San Lorenzo in Florence (but historians have suggested dates between 1519 and 1534). They are known to have been in the artist's store on the via Mozza until 1544, when Michelangelo's nephew, Leonardo Buonarroti, asked for permission to sell them (Michelangelo did not set foot in Florence after 1534). This permission was denied and it was only in 1564 that they were sold, along with The Genius of Victory to the Grand Duke Cosimo I, who placed them in the four corners of the Grotto of Buontalenti before 1591. They were removed from there in 1908 to join the Michelangelo collection which had been formed in the Florentine gallery.

Regarding the date of their creation, Justi (and others) have proposed 1519 on the basis of a letter of 13 February in which Jacopo Salviati assured the cardinal Aginesis, heir of Pope Julius II that the sculptor would have produced four figures for the tomb before the summer of that year. Wilde proposed 1523, because there is a reference to the cardinal Giulio de' Medici (the future Clement VII) having seen them before he left for Rome on that date. However de Tolnay dated them to 1530–1534, based on stylistic factors, the frequent mentions of unfinished sculptures for the tomb of Pope Julius in Michelangelo's letters of 1531–1532 and because Vasari mentions that they were made while Michelangelo prepared the cartoon of The Last Judgment.

A wax bozzetto of the work at the Victoria and Albert Museum in London is generally considered to have been made by Michelangelo himself.

== Description and style ==
The Young Slave has slightly bent knees as if bearing an enormous force bearing down his back. His left arm is raised to cover his face and his right arm is behind his back, held by a chain which is not visible. The figure is among the most complete of the group and shows clear definition in his legs, torso (especially on the left hand side) and his arms. His hands and head are less worked, while the back is completely unsculpted. The whole surface gives clear traces of the chisels and scrapers used in the sculpting process.

Because of its unfinished state it has an extraordinary energy (already noted by Bocchi in 1591), which connects the figure to some kind of primordial act of liberation from its prison of crude stone – an epic battle with chaos. The meaning of the Prigioni was probably linked to the motif of the Captivi in Roman art. In fact, Vasari identifies them as personifications of the provinces controlled by Julius II. For Condivi, however, they symbolised the Arts, turned into "prisoners" after the Pope's death. Other scholars have made suggested philosophical-symbolic meanings or links to the personal life of the artist and his "torments".

== Bibliography ==
- Umberto Baldini, Michelangelo scultore, Rizzoli, Milano 1973.
- Marta Alvarez Gonzáles, Michelangelo, Mondadori Arte, Milano 2007. ISBN 978-88-370-6434-1
- AA.VV., Galleria dell'Accademia, Giunti, Firenze 1999. ISBN 88-09-04880-6

== See also ==
- Tomb of Julius II
- List of works by Michelangelo
