= Bearded Slave =

Sculpture by Michelangelo

- Schiavo barbuto (Italian)
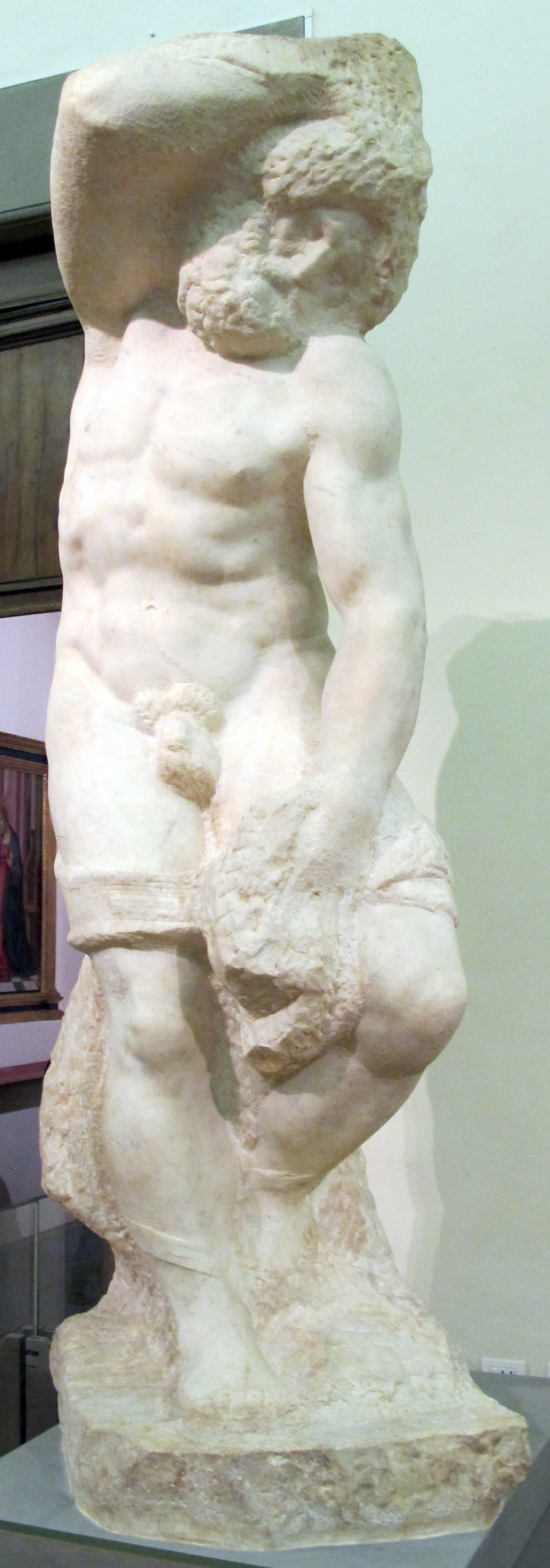
- Artist: Michelangelo
- Year: c. 1525–1530
- Type: sculpture
- Medium: Marble
- Dimensions: 263 cm (104 in)
- Location: Galleria dell'Accademia; Florence
- Preceded by: Awakening Slave
- Followed by: Medici Madonna

The Bearded Slave (Italian: Schiavo barbuto) is a marble sculpture by Michelangelo datable to around 1525–1530 and kept in the Galleria dell'Accademia in Florence. It forms part of the series of unfinished Prigioni intended for the Tomb of Pope Julius II.

== History ==
It seems that, from the first design of the Tomb of Pope Julius II (1505), a series of "Prigioni" was planned for the bottom level of the mausoleum, a series of statues larger than life size of chained figures in various poses, leaning on pilasters which would frame niches containing winged Victories and be surmounted by herms. With a pair on each side of each niche, there must initially have been sixteen or twenty such statues planned. This number was reduced in successive designs, to twelve (second version, 1513), eight (third version, 1516) and finally maybe only four (fourth version, 1526, or fifth version, 1532), before being eliminated from the project altogether in the final version of 1542.

The first members of the series, who are mentioned in Michelangelo's letters are the two Prigioni of Paris, named the "Slaves" in the nineteenth century: the Dying Slave and the Rebellious Slave. They were carved in Rome around 1513.

The Florentine Prigioni (Young Slave, Bearded Slave, Atlas Slave and the Awakening Slave) were probably carved instead in the second half of the 1520s, while Michelangelo was employed at San Lorenzo in Florence (but historians suggest dates between 1519 and 1534). It is known that they were in the artist's warehouse on the via Mozza in 1544, when his nephew Leonardo Buonarroti asked permission to sell them (Michelangelo did not visit Florence after 1534). The permission was denied and only in 1564 were they donated, along with the Genius of Victory, to the Grand Duke Cosimo I who placed them at the four corners of the Grotto of Buontalenti in 1591. They were removed from there in 1908, in order to be reunited with other works of Michelangelo in the Florentine gallery.

With respect to the exact date, Justi (and others) propose 1519, on the basis of a letter of 13 February, in which Jacopo Salviati promised the cardinal Aginesis, Julius II's heir, that the sculptor would have the four figures for the tomb ready by the summer of that year; Wilde proposes 1523, pointing to a statement of the cardinal Giulio de' Medici (the future Clement VII) who had seen them before he departed for Rome in that year; finally de Tolnay dates them to 1530–1534 on the basis on their style, frequent references to incomplete sculptures for the pope's tomb in letters of 1531–2 and Vasari's statement that they were created while the artist was preparing the cartoon of The Last Judgment.

== Description and style ==
The Bearded Slave is the most finished of the Florentine Prigioni and gets his name from his thick, curly beard. The way his muscular torso twists indicates a deep knowledge of anatomy, typical of the best works of Michelangelo; his legs, slightly bent and separated, are covered by a band of fabric. His right arm is raised to hold his bent head, while his left hand remains unfinished, but seems to hold the band of fabric.

The whole surface retains many traces of the various chisels and scrapers used on the sculpture. Along his hips there is a repaired fracture, whose cause is unknown.

Its unfinished state creates an extraordinary energy (already noted by Bocchi in 1591), with the figure caught in a sort of primordial act of freeing himself from the cage of the rough stone, an epic battle with the forces of chaos. The iconographic meaning of the figures was probably linked to the motif of the captivi in Roman art, and indeed Vasari identified the Prigioni as personifications of the provinces controlled by Julius II. For Condivi, however, they symbolised the Arts, made "prisoners" by the death of the pontif. Other scholars have made proposals of a philosophical/symbolic character or connected to the artist's personal life and his "torments".

== See also ==
- Tomb of Pope Julius II
- List of works by Michelangelo

== Bibliography ==
- Umberto Baldini, Michelangelo scultore, Rizzoli, Milano 1973.
- Marta Alvarez Gonzáles, Michelangelo, Mondadori Arte, Milano 2007. ISBN 978-88-370-6434-1
- AA.VV., Galleria dell'Accademia, Giunti, Firenze 1999. ISBN 88-09-04880-6
