= Dying Slave =

Sculpture by Michelangelo

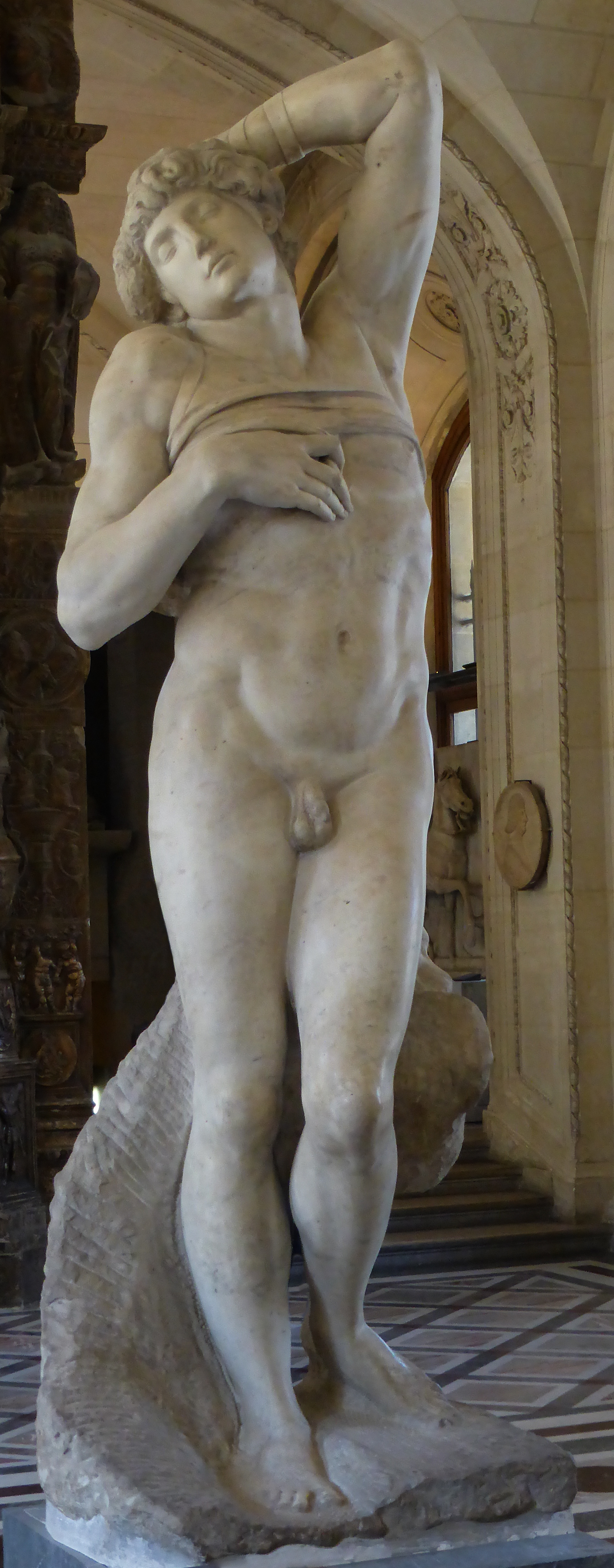
- Artist: Michelangelo
- Year: 1513–1516
- Type: Sculpture
- Medium: Marble
- Dimensions: 215 cm (84.6 in)
- Location: Louvre, Paris
- Preceded by: Rebellious Slave
- Followed by: Young Slave

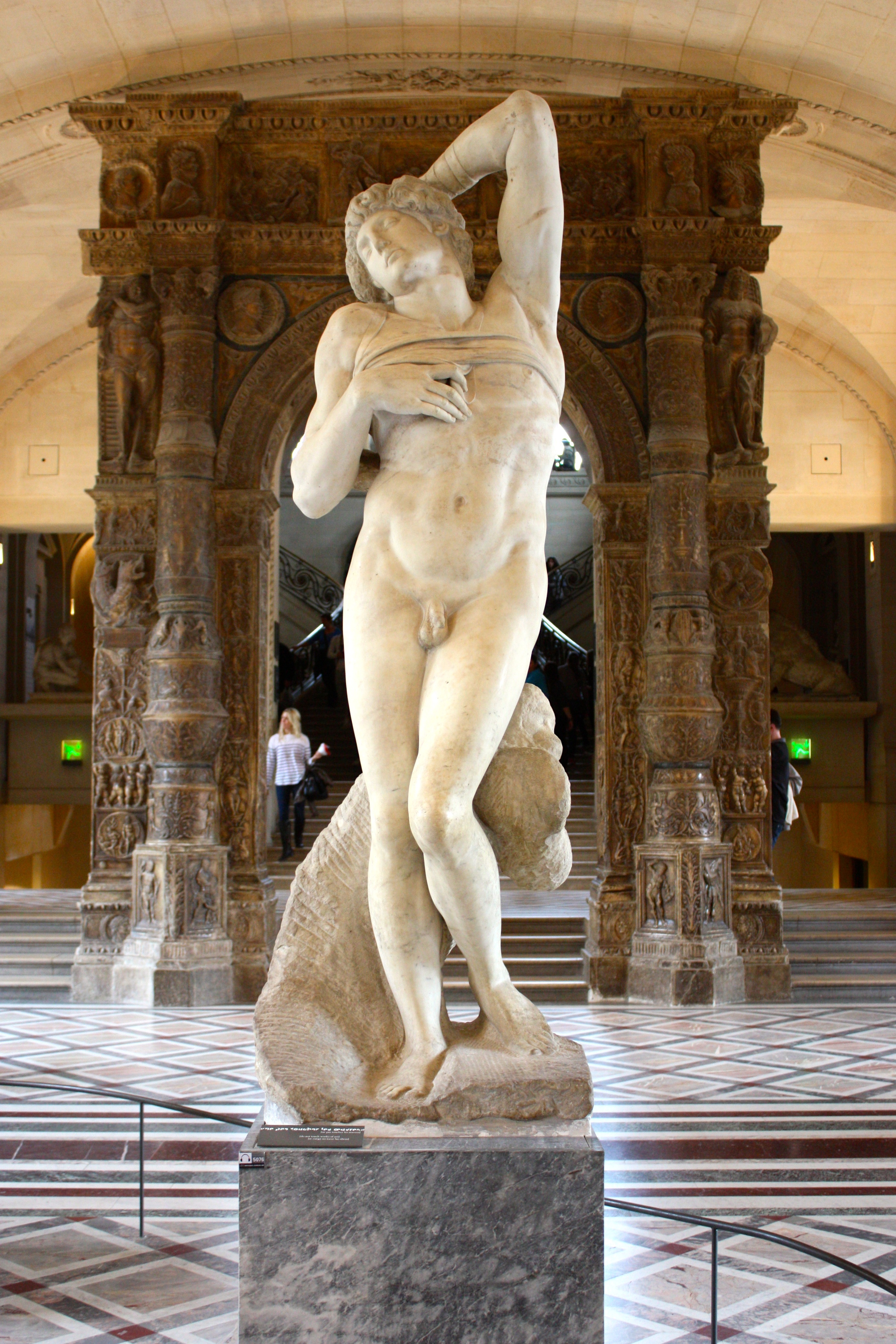

The Dying Slave (L'Esclave mourant, Lo Schiavo morente) is a marble sculpture by the Italian Renaissance artist Michelangelo, created between 1513 and 1516. It was intended to accompany another figure, the Rebellious Slave, as part of the design for the Tomb of Pope Julius II. The sculpture stands 215 centimeters (7 ft 1 in) tall and is housed in the Louvre Museum in Paris.

== History ==
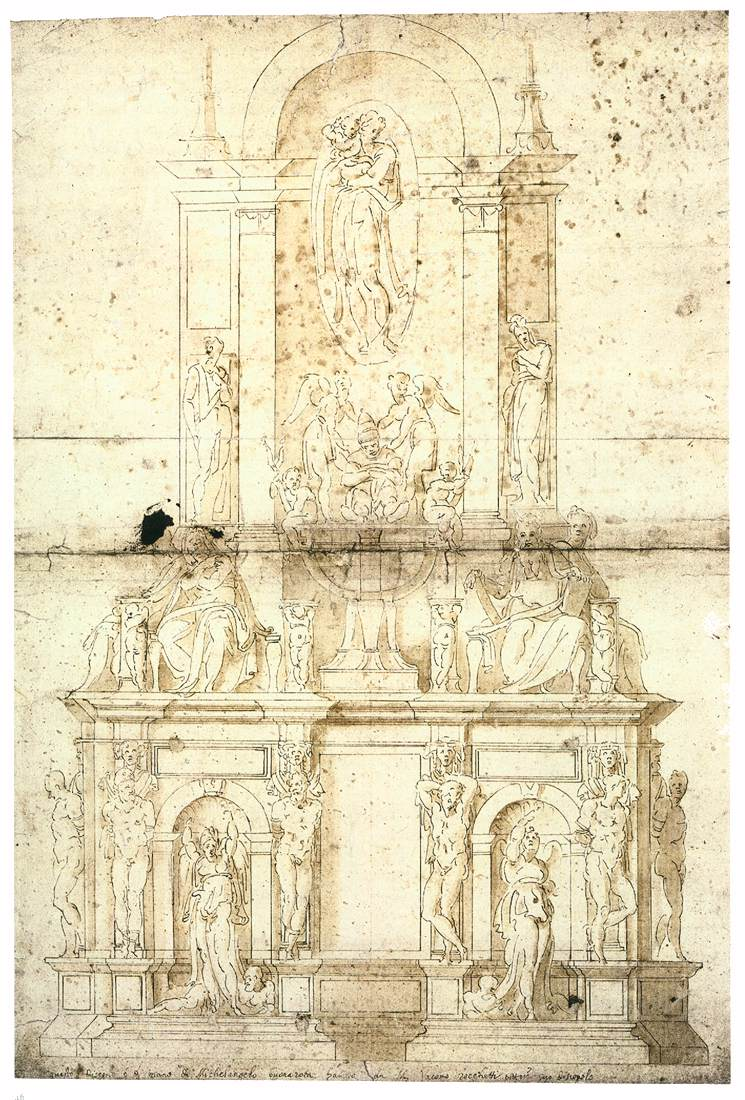
Drawing showing Michelangelo's plan from 1513

The Dying Slave was produced during the second design phase of Julius II's tomb, a project that went through several revisions over many decades. Erwin Panofsky suggested that it was likely meant to stand in the lower left corner of the monument, along with the Rebellious Slave, which he regarded as its pendant. Charles de Tolnay, however, observed in drawing that likely shows the 1513 plan that the Dying Slave was meant to appear near the center of the monument. Subsequent scholars have agreed with Tolnay, suggesting that the Rebellious Slave, which likely appeared at a corner or along one of the sides of the tomb, may not have been meant as a pendant to the Dying Slave.

In later plans from 1516 and 1542, Michelangelo indicated that the two slaves would appear in the niches flanking Moses. As the project developed, Michelangelo reconsidered their role and ultimately proposed himself to replace them in the niches with the figures Rachel and Leah. By the 1540s, the slaves were fully excluded from the final tomb.

Although Michelangelo initially planned a larger series of figures, only two, the Dying Slave and the Rebellious slave, were brought to close completion. The others, the Young Slave, the Bearded Slave, the Awakening Slave, and the Atlas Slave remained unfinished and still partially embedded in their marble blocks.

== Provenance ==
After the tomb plans changed, the sculptures left Michelangelo's possession. Around 1546, he gifted the Dying Slave and Rebellious Slave to Ruberto Strozzi in gratitude for hospitality during periods of illness. The works subsequently passed through several prominent French owners, including King Francis I and Anne de Montmorency, who installed them at the Château d'Écouen.

Over the following centuries, the sculptures were relocated multiple times, including to the Château de Richelieu. By the late eighteenth century, they had arrived in Paris, where they were acquired for the French state during the revolutionary period. Since then, they have remained in the Louvre Museum.

== Description ==
The figure is depicted nude, bound loosely across the torso, and, despite the title by which the work is commonly known, he appears healthy. The front of the sculpture is highly finished, with smooth, polished surfaces that emphasize the idealized anatomy. In contrast, areas such as the back, hair, and parts of the limbs retain visible chisel marks, revealing Michelangelo's working process and the incomplete state of certain areas.

A portion of the original marble block remains attached behind the figure, particularly near the right arm, reinforcing the sense that the figure is emerging from the stone. An assistant may have contributed to some areas, such as the detailing of the foot. A small, partially carved monkey figure, sometimes referred to as an "ape," appears behind the leg.

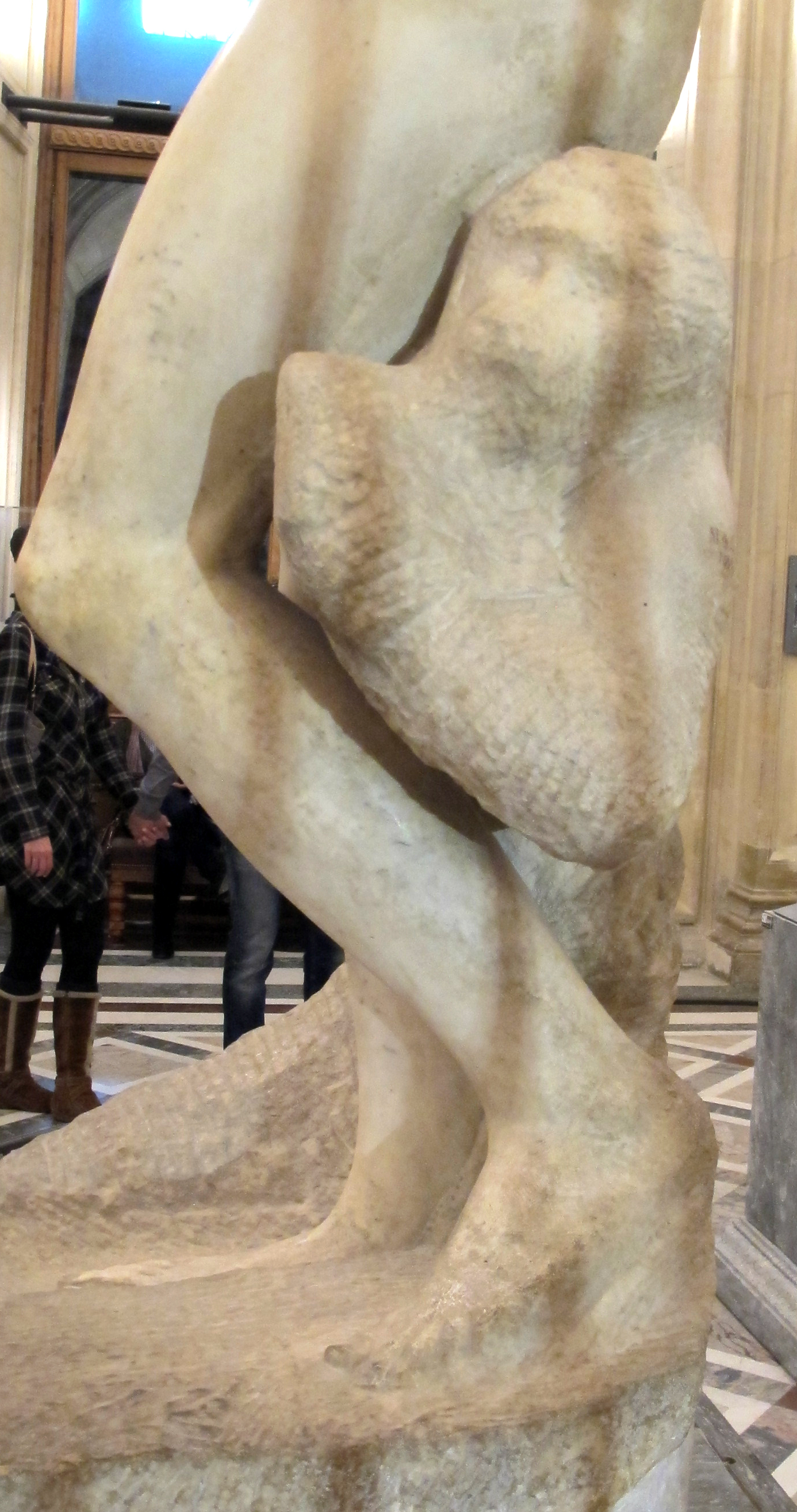
Detail of the ape, located behind the sculpture's left leg.

== Interpretation ==
The meaning of the Dying Slave has been widely debated since the sixteenth century. Early accounts, including those by Giorgio Vasari and Ascanio Condivi, offer different explanations. Vasari indicated that they are captives, representing territories conquered by Julius II. Condivi suggested that the figures represented the enslavement of the liberal arts after the death of the pope, their great patron.

Some more modern scholars have expanded these interpretations. Oscar Ollendorff interpreted the figures as Neoplatonic representations of the human soul trapped within the physical body, an idea that was later developed by Panofsky and Tolnay. Others have suggested that they symbolize spiritual struggle or bondage to sin, drawing on Christian theological themes.

As noted by modern scholars, the sculptures do not closely resemble traditional depictions of bound captives from antiquity, which are typically rigid and restrained.

The 1978 dramatic monologue: “Bound Captive” depicting Michelangelo’s statue the “Dying Slave” by the American poet, Jenny Lind Porter, was published as a recorded recital by the bass-baritone and performing artist Odekhiren Amaize.

== See also ==
- List of works by Michelangelo
- St. Quentin (Pontormo)
- Representation of slavery in European art
