= Saint Quentin (painting) =

Painting attributed to Pontormo

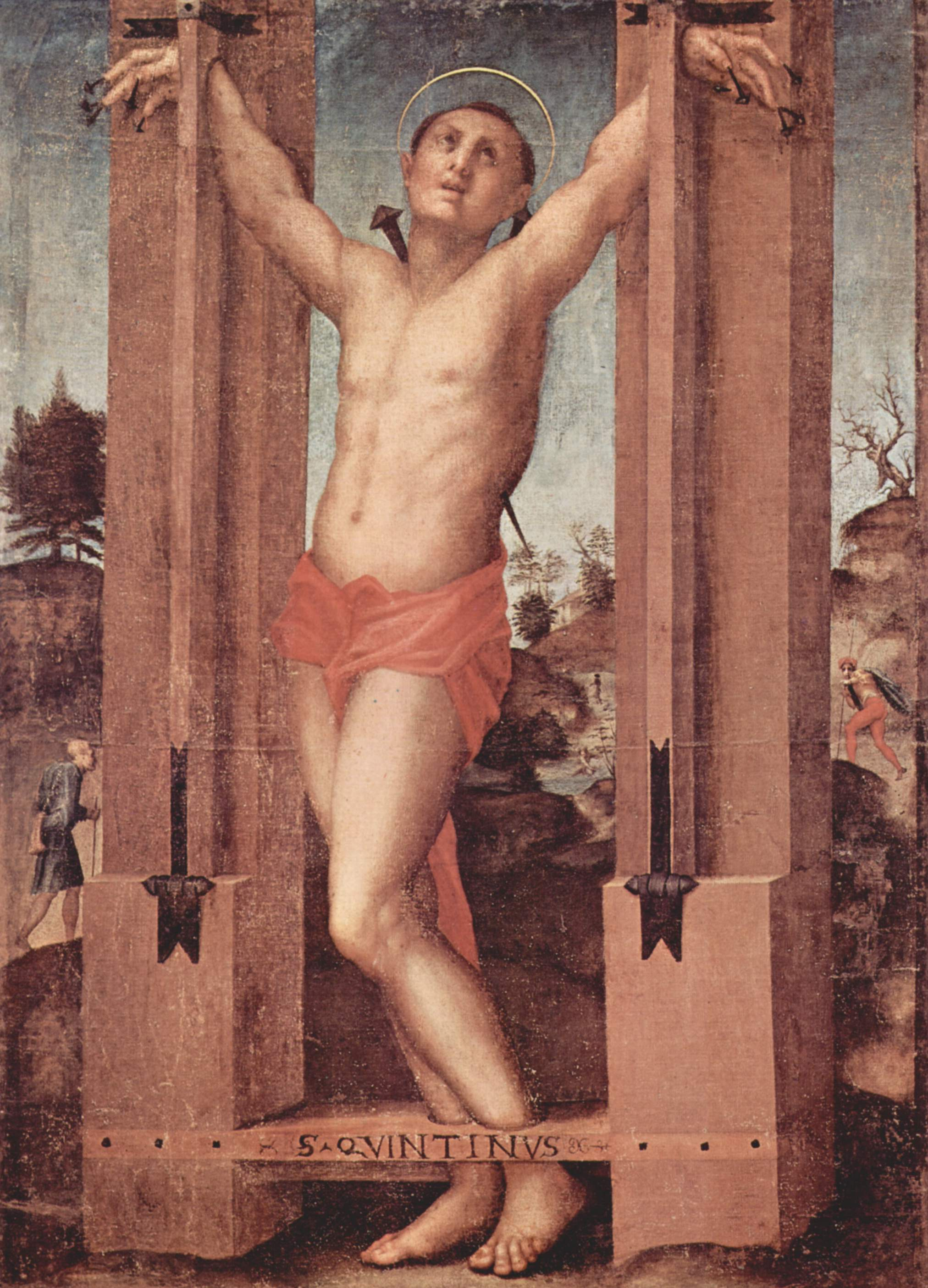
- Artist: Jacopo Pontormo
- Year: 1517
- Medium: oil on canvas
- Dimensions: 150 cm × 100 cm (59 in × 39 in)
- Location: Museo Civico di Sansepolcro; Sansepolcro

Saint Quentin is a painting attributed to the Italian Renaissance master Jacopo Pontormo, executed in 1517, now in the Museo Civico in Sansepolcro.

== Description ==
According to Giorgio Vasari's Lives of the Artists, one of Pontormo's pupils, Gianmaria Pichi, was commissioned by his hometown of Sansepolcro to make a processional standard with the figure of Saint Quentin. Pontormo decided to collaborate on the work, to the extent that he finished most of it.

The saint's posture resembles that of the Dying Slave by Michelangelo (1513-1516), a friend of Pontormo. The position of the nails in the saint's body is directly inspired by his entry in Jacobus de Voragine's Legenda Aurea, which is a collection of hagiographies.

== Sources ==
- D’Adda, R. (2004). Pontormo. Milan: Rizzoli/Skira. pp. 98–99.
