= Tomb of Pope Julius II =

1505 sculpture by Michelangelo

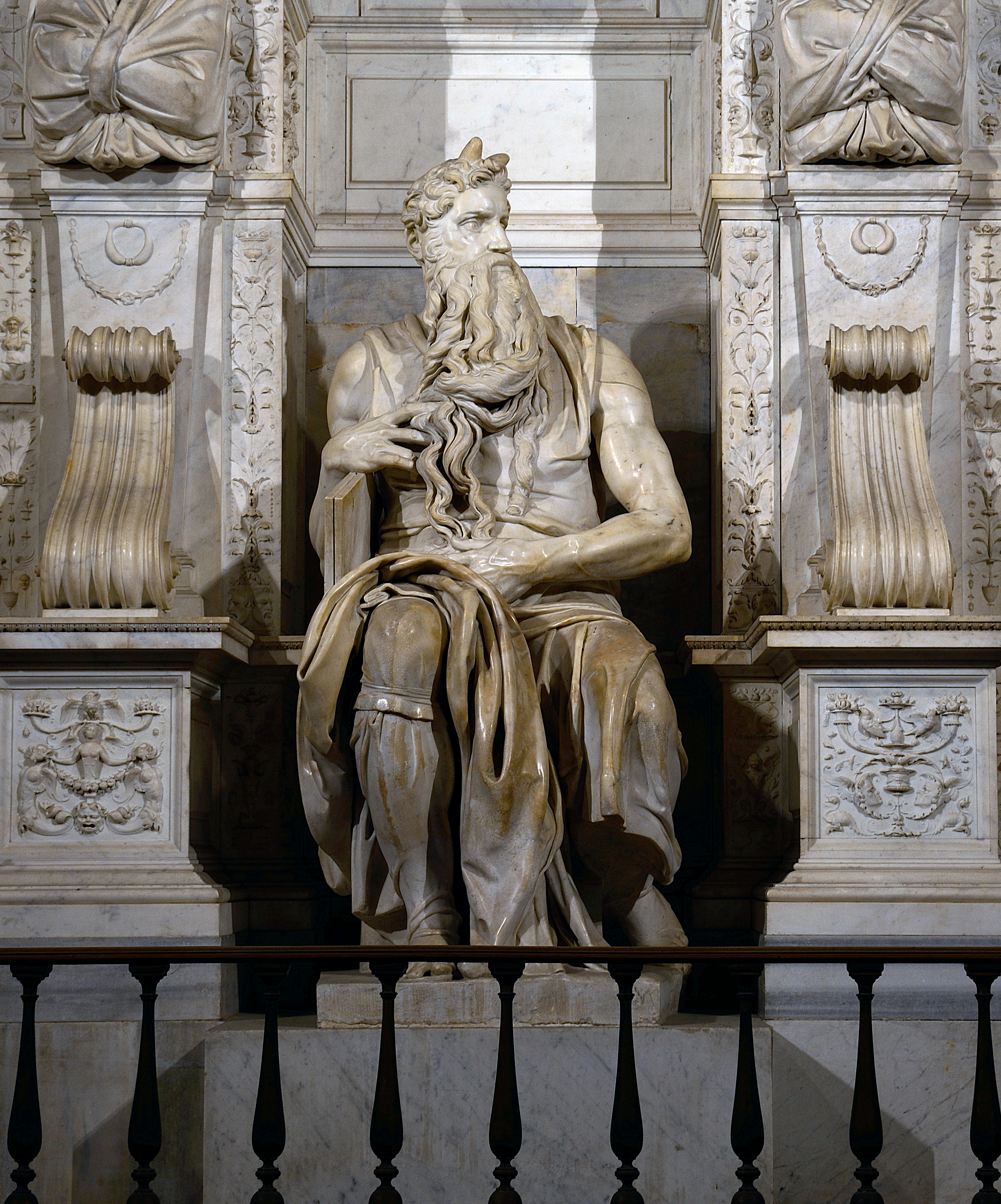
- Michelangelo's Moses
- Click on the map for a fullscreen view
- Artist: Michelangelo
- Year: 1505
- Type: Sculpture
- Location: Rome; 41°53′38″N 12°29′36″E
- Preceded by: St. Matthew (Michelangelo)
- Followed by: Moses (Michelangelo)

The Tomb of Pope Julius II is a sculptural and architectural ensemble by Michelangelo and his assistants. Originally intended for St. Peter's Basilica, the structure was instead placed in the church of San Pietro in Vincoli on the Esquiline in Rome after the pope's death. This church was patronized by the Della Rovere family from which Julius came, and he had been titular cardinal there. Julius II, however, is buried next to his uncle Sixtus IV in St. Peter's Basilica, so the final structure does not actually function as a tomb.

Michelangelo was commissioned by Pope Julius II to design and execute a monumental sepulchral monument in 1505, but work on the project was repeatedly postponed and did not begin in earnest until 1542. Over the nearly four decades between the initial commission and the completion of the reduced version in 1545, the project underwent numerous revisions and interruptions. As originally conceived, the tomb would have been a colossal structure that would have given Michelangelo the room he needed for his superhuman, tragic beings. This project became one of the great disappointments of Michelangelo's life when the pope, for unexplained reasons, interrupted the commission, possibly because funds had to be diverted for Bramante's rebuilding of St. Peter's. The original project called for a freestanding, three-level structure with some 40 statues. Among the statues, only the Moses is regarded as fully representative of his artistic achievement. Michelangelo's official biographer, Ascanio Condivi, records that the artist considered this single statue sufficient to confer distinction upon the monument, stating that it alone was enough to bring honor to the tomb of Pope Julius II. Michelangelo felt that this was his most lifelike creation. Legend has it that upon its completion he struck the right knee commanding, "now speak!" as he felt that life was the only thing left inside the marble. There is a scar on the knee thought to be the mark of Michelangelo's hammer.

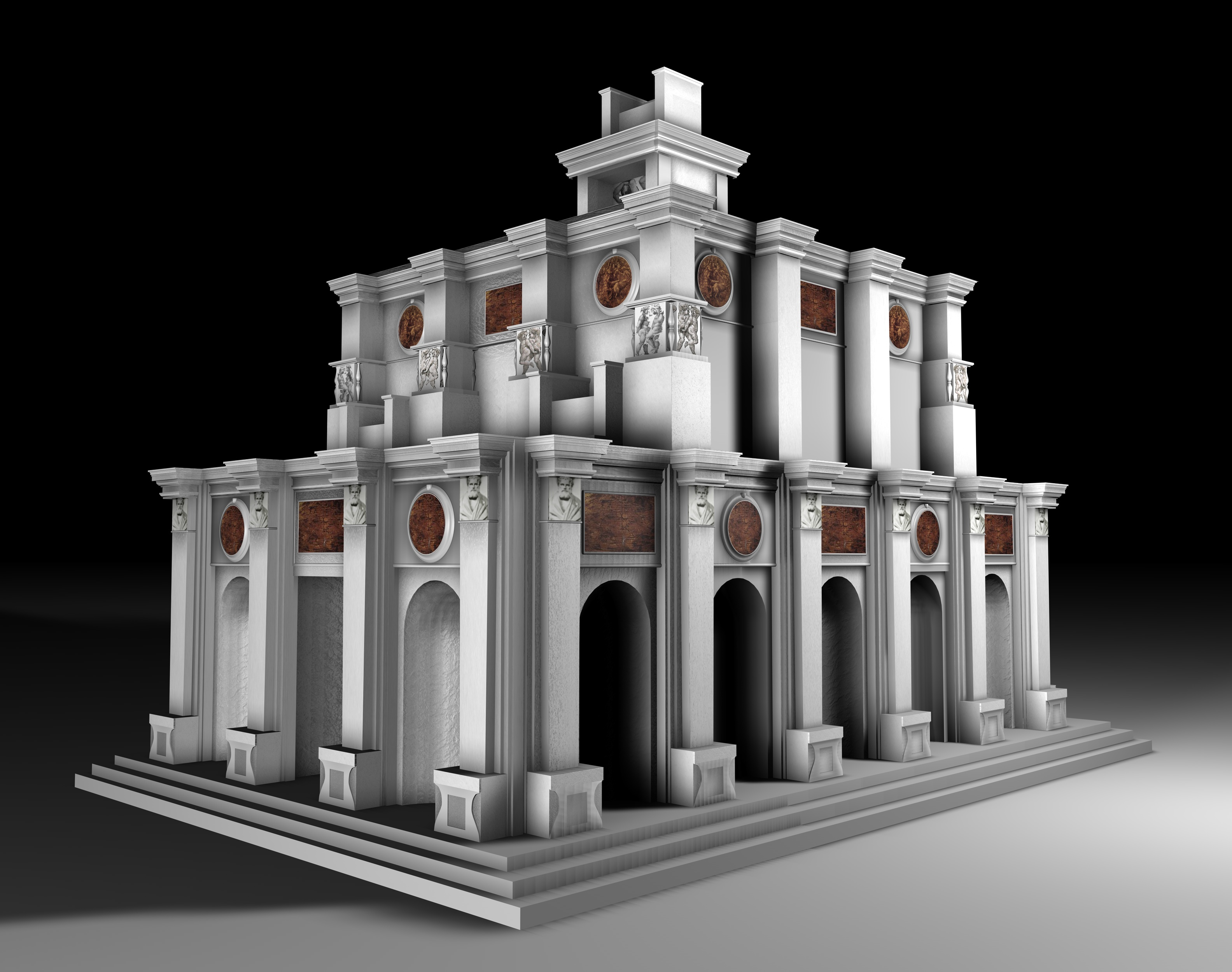
Hypothetical reconstruction of the first project for the tomb of Julius II (1505) according to a new interpretation by Adriano Marinazzo (2018).

The protracted history of the project was marked by significant difficulties, including repeated delays, contractual disputes, and reductions in scale. Michelangelo himself referred to the endeavor as the "tragedy of the tomb", and Condivi described it as having brought the artist "infinite difficulties, displeasures, and troubles and, what is worse, infamy due to the malice of certain men, from which he was barely exonerated after many years".

== First project (1505) ==
It was probably Giuliano da Sangallo who informed Pope Julius II, who had been elected two years earlier, of Michelangelo's achievements in Florence, particularly the sculpture of the colossal David. The pope subsequently summoned the artist to Rome. Michelangelo's departure required him to suspend several projects then in progress in Florence, including a series of twelve marble apostles intended for the Duomo and a large-scale cartoon for the fresco of the Battle of Cascina, commissioned for the Palazzo Vecchio.

Pope Julius II pursued an ambitious program of government that closely linked political objectives with artistic patronage. He assembled a circle of leading artists (including Bramante and, subsequently, Raphael) with the explicit aim of restoring to Rome and the papal authority the grandeur associated with the ancient imperial past.

Michelangelo was commissioned to design and execute a monumental tomb for the pope, intended for installation in the tribune, then under construction, of St. Peter's Basilica. An agreement regarding the design and compensation of 10,000 ducats was reached within approximately two months. Following the formal approval of the project and the receipt of a substantial advance payment, Michelangelo proceeded to select marble blocks from the quarries.

The first design is known primarily through the written accounts of Ascanio Condivi and Giorgio Vasari, which, despite certain discrepancies in their descriptions, provide a general understanding of its scope and configuration. The proposed structure was a freestanding architectural complex with a rectangular base measuring approximately 10.8 by 7.2 meters and rising to a height of about 8 meters in its lowest register. It consisted of three progressively narrower orders, creating the effect of an architectural and sculptural pyramid. Approximately forty larger-than-life-size statues (some freestanding and others positioned within niches or against pilasters) were to surround the pope's elevated catafalque, with sculptural elements distributed across all four faces of the monument.

The lower register was to incorporate between two and four niches, each containing a statue of a winged Victory flanked by chained male nude figures, referred to in the sources as the "Prisoners" and modeled on Roman representations of captivi, positioned against pilasters and surmounted by busts. The upper register was to feature four large seated figures, including a Moses, a Saint Paul, and personifications of the Active Life and the Contemplative Life. These figures, whether placed at the corners or along the shorter sides, were intended to draw the viewer's attention upward to the summit, where a semi-reclining statue of the pope on a catafalque was to be accompanied by bronze reliefs and two allegorical figures, identified by Condivi as angels and by Vasari as Heaven and Earth. The actual sarcophagus was to be housed within an internal oval sacellum, accessible through a portal or portals on one or both of the shorter sides. The positioning of the papal statue, guided from the tomb by two angels, was intended to evoke the resurrection of the deceased at the Last Judgment, a motif comparable to that employed in the Monument to Margaret of Luxembourg by Giovanni Pisano.

The monument was planned for a location within St. Peter's Basilica corresponding to the site of the present-day baldachin, a position of exceptional prominence that the pope, following the initial phase of the project, may have come to reconsider.

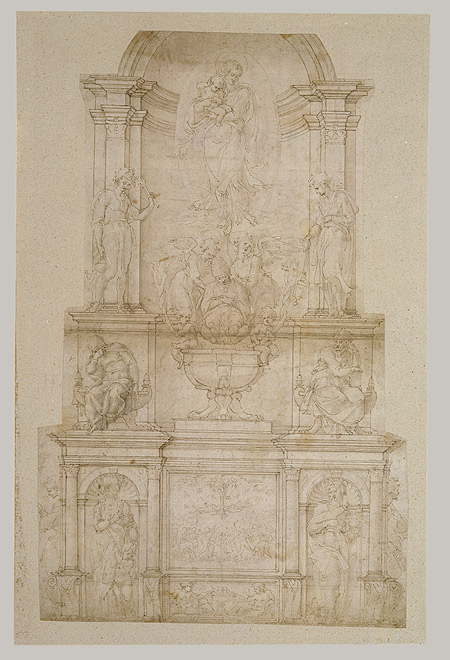
Study for a wall tomb, c. 1506, attributed to Michelangelo. This may be a surviving visual evidence for the project commissioned in 1505, but contradicts Michelangelo's early biographers' description of a freestanding tomb.

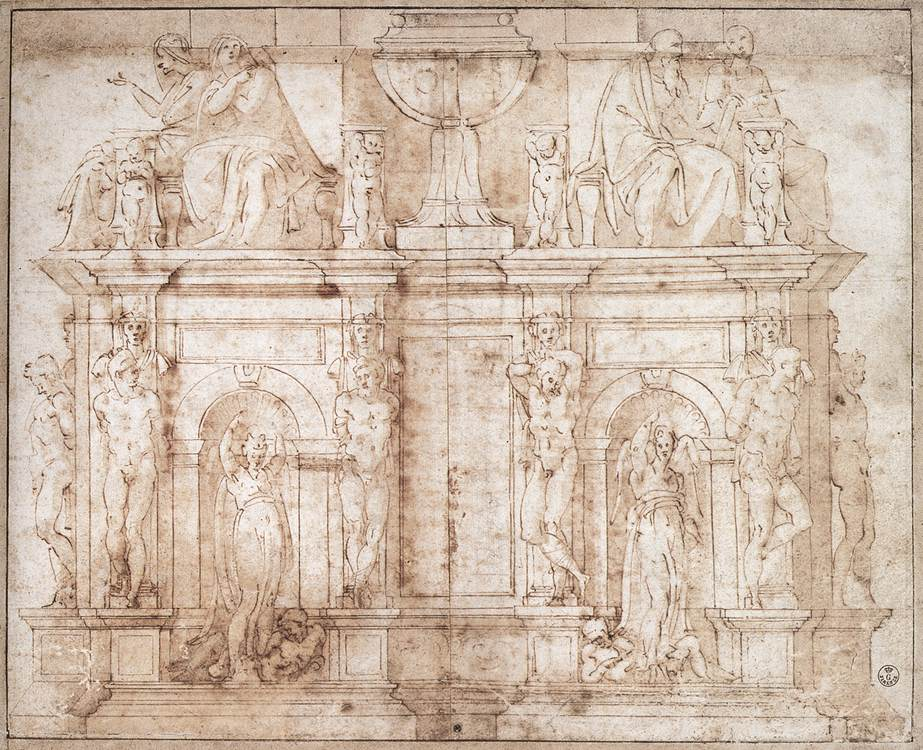
Michelangelo Second design for wall tomb for Julius II.

== Conflict with the Pope ==
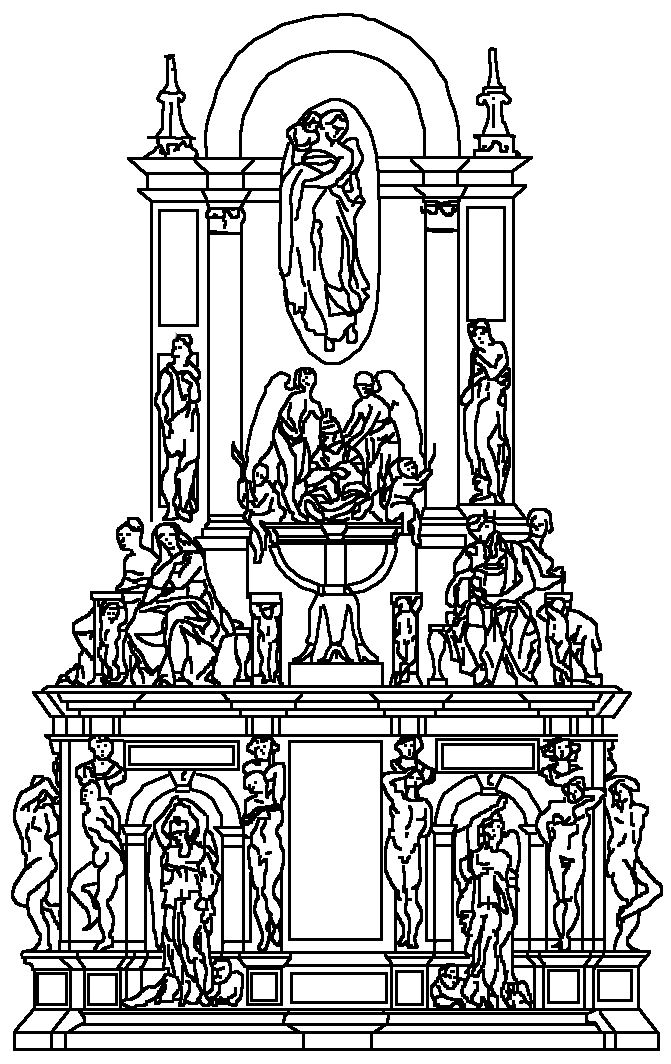
Reconstruction of the 1513 project

Michelangelo proceeded to the quarries of Carrara, where he personally selected the marble blocks to be used for the monument, a task that occupied him from May to December 1505. During his absence, opposition to the project emerged among certain members of the papal artistic circle. Michelangelo's rapid rise to prominence following his arrival in Rome appears to have engendered resentment among other artists in the pope's service, as it threatened their own access to patronage and the finite resources available for artistic commissions. In particular, Donato Bramante, who had been appointed shortly after the tomb contract was signed to oversee the ambitious reconstruction of the Constantinian basilica, is said to have persuaded Julius II to suspend work on the tomb, arguing that it was inauspicious to construct a sepulchral monument for a living person. As a result, when Michelangelo returned to Rome in the spring of 1506, he discovered that his project had been effectively set aside in favor of the rebuilding of St. Peter's Basilica and preparations for military campaigns against Perugia and Bologna. Unable to obtain a clarifying audience with the pope and unwilling to tolerate what he perceived as court intrigues, Michelangelo abruptly left Rome on 18 April 1506. He later wrote that, had he remained, "my own burial would be completed before that of the pope." Five papal messengers dispatched to recall him pursued him as far as Poggibonsi, but without success.

From Florence, where he had taken refuge, Michelangelo resisted repeated attempts at reconciliation until the pope issued three formal papal briefs to the Florentine Signoria and the gonfalonier Pier Soderini urged him to comply, stating that Florence could not risk conflict with the papacy on his account. Michelangelo eventually agreed to resume contact with Julius II during the latter's stay in Bologna, where the Bentivoglio family had recently been expelled. While there, he executed a bronze statue depicting the pope in a blessing pose. Returning to Rome a few years later, he received the commission to paint the ceiling of the Sistine Chapel, a project that occupied him until 1512. Pope Julius II died on 21 February 1513 and was subsequently buried behind the high altar of St. Peter's Basilica, beneath the pavement.

== Second project (1513) ==
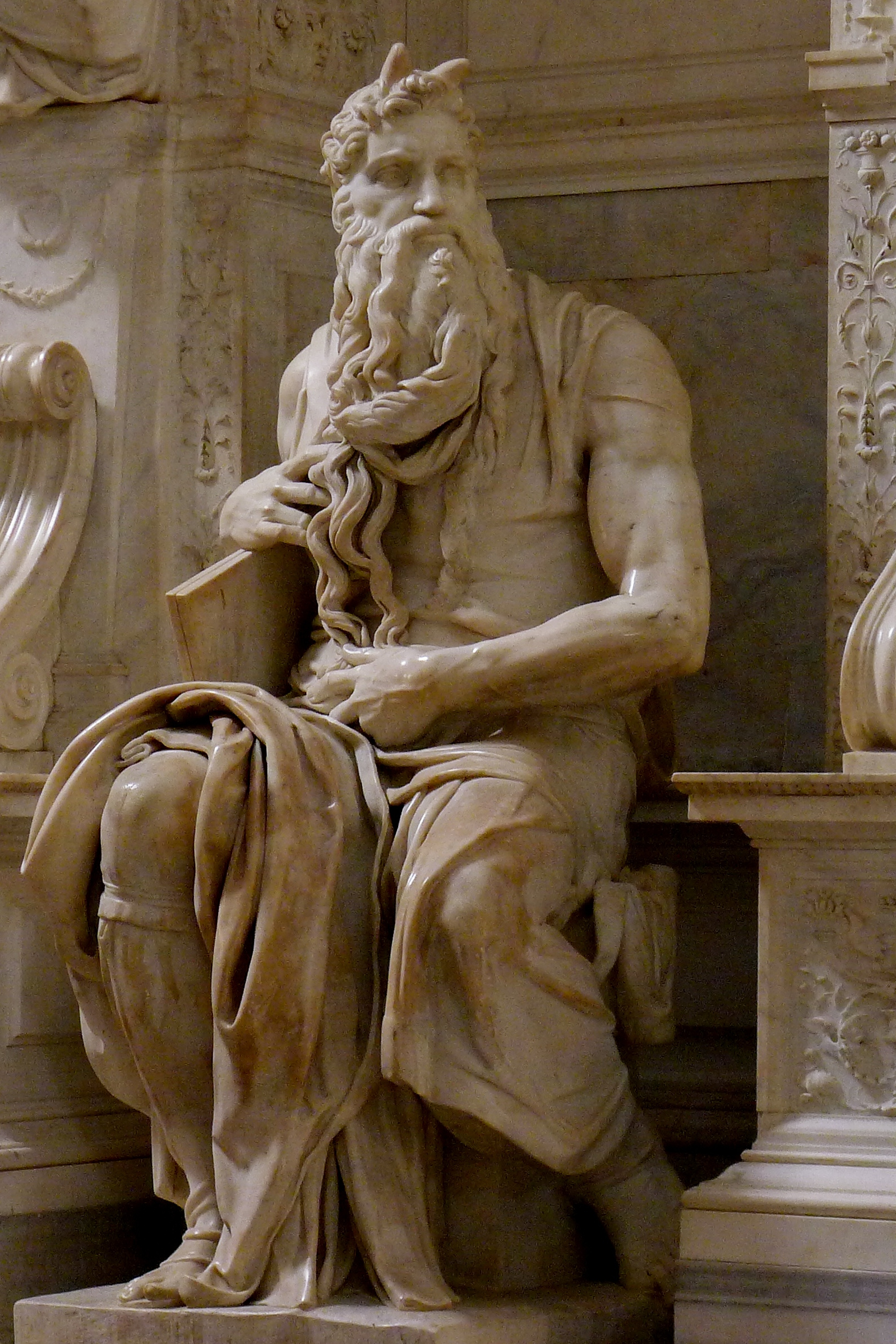
The Moses

Following the death of Pope Julius II, his will provided for the continuation of the tomb project. In consultation with the pope's heirs, however, the design was modified, and a new contract was signed in May 1513. The most significant change was the reconfiguration of the monument as a wall tomb, with the elimination of the internal mortuary chamber; these alterations were retained in all subsequent versions of the project. The decision to abandon the freestanding structure, which the heirs deemed excessively ambitious and costly, necessitated a more compact arrangement, with a greater concentration of sculptural elements on the visible surfaces. For instance, the four seated figures, which had previously been distributed across two faces of the monument, were now to be positioned near the two projecting corners of the principal front. The lower register maintained a comparable organization, but the central portal was omitted and replaced with a smooth band, thereby reinforcing the vertical progression of the composition. Lateral extensions remained substantial, as the catafalque was still planned perpendicular to the wall, supporting the recumbent figure of the pope held by two winged figures. Each side was to incorporate two niches replicating the arrangement of the front face. Above these, beneath a low segmental vault carried on pilasters, a Madonna and Child within an almond-shaped frame was to be accompanied by five additional figures.

The contract included a provision, which was not strictly enforced, requiring Michelangelo to devote himself exclusively to the tomb and to complete it within a maximum of seven years.

Michelangelo began work on the revised project and produced several significant sculptures, including the two Prisoners now in the Louvre, the Dying Slave and the Rebellious Slave, as well as the Moses, which was subsequently incorporated into the final version of the monument. Although he did not adhere to the exclusivity clause, in order to maintain other sources of income such as the sculpture of the first Christ of the Minerva in 1514, these works represent the principal surviving output from this phase of the project.

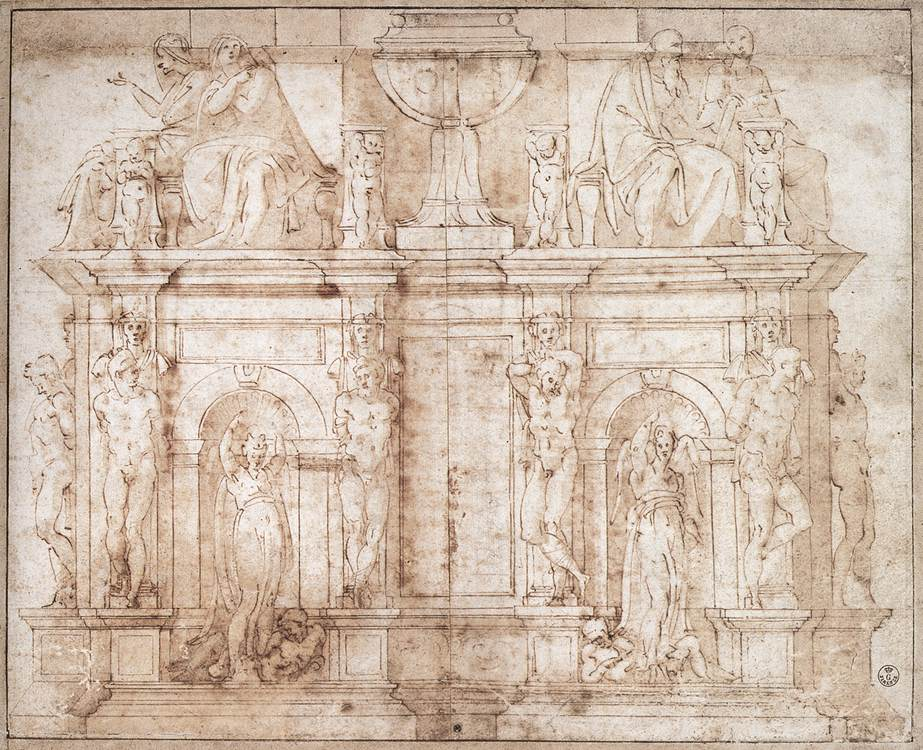
Antonio da Sangallo the Younger, copy of the second project for the tomb of Julius II

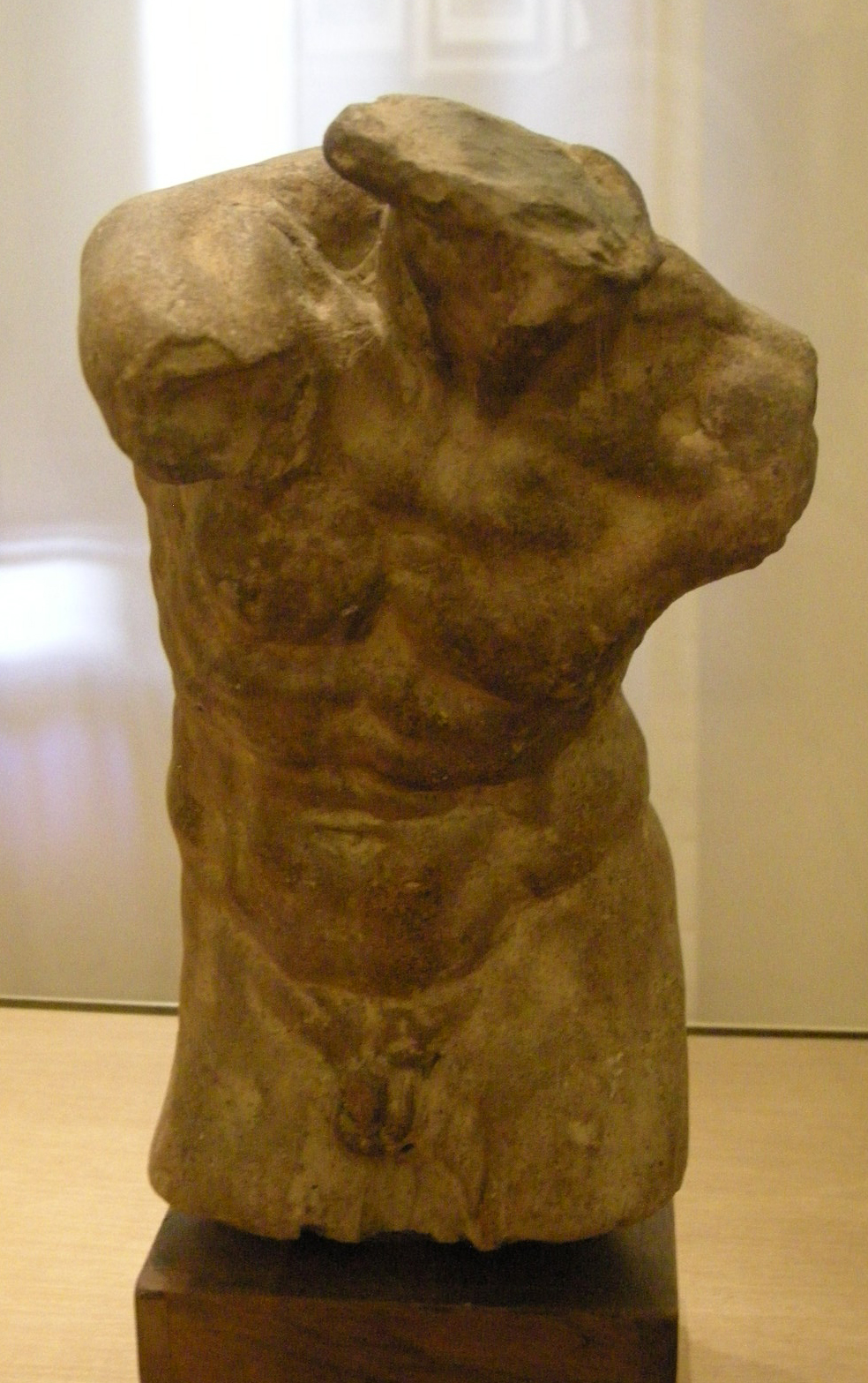
Rough model for a Prisoner (?), Casa Buonarroti

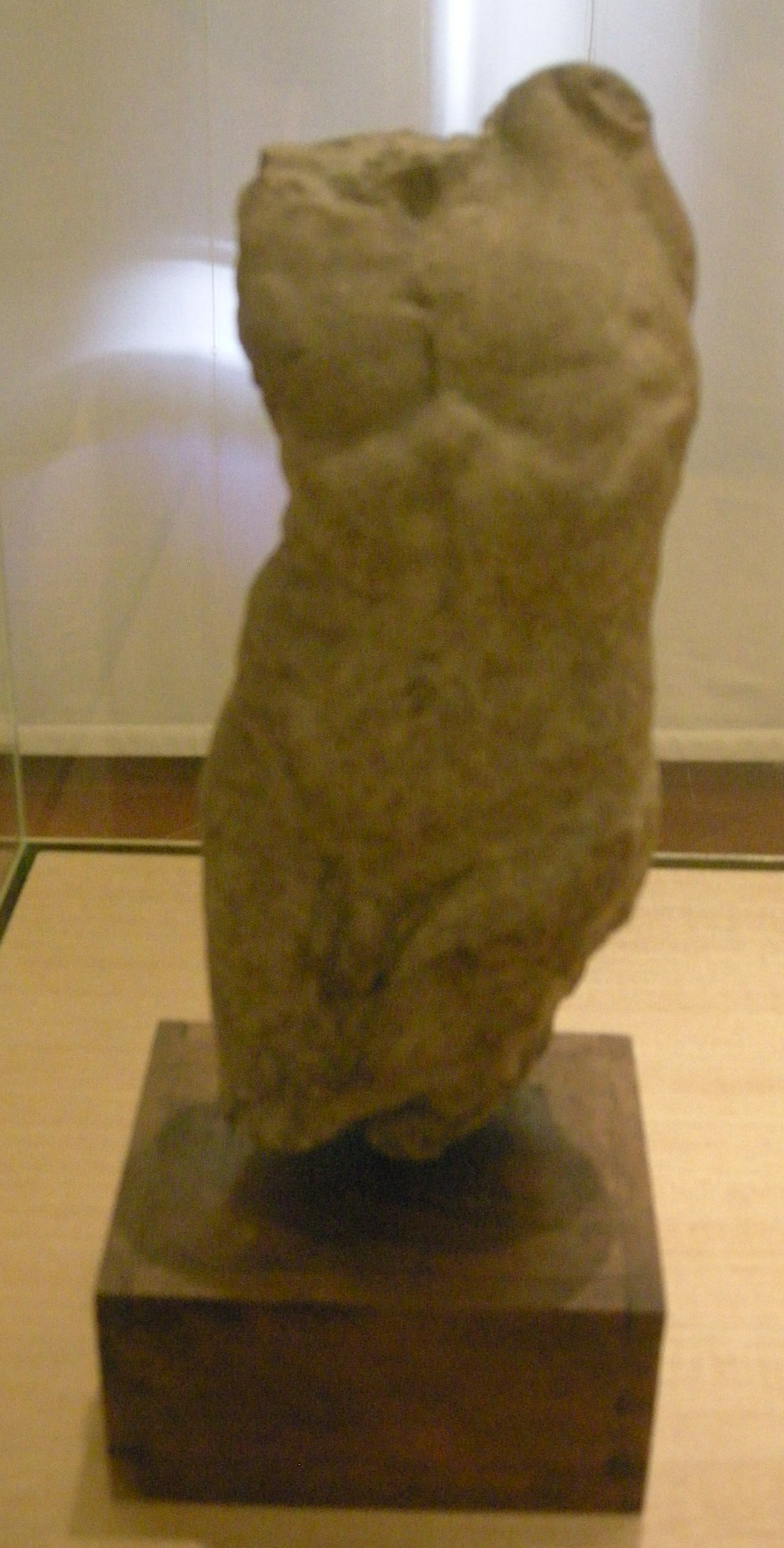
Rough model for a Prisoner (?), Casa Buonarroti

== Third project (1516) ==
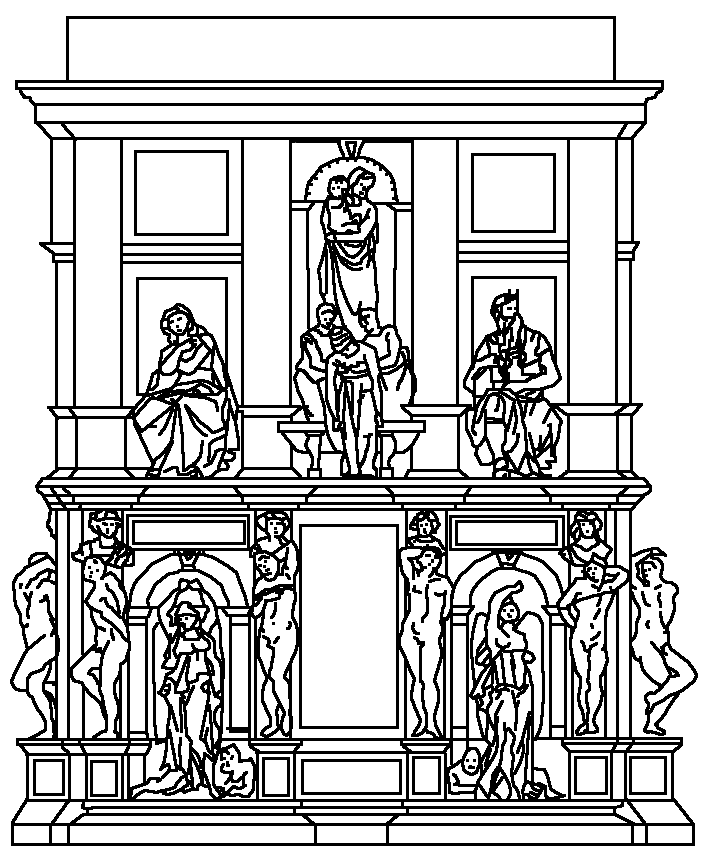
Hypothetical reconstruction of the 1516 project

In July 1516, a new contract was concluded for a third version of the monument, which entailed a further reduction in the number of statues. The lateral faces were shortened to the depth of a single niche, each containing a Victory flanked by two Prisoners positioned against pilasters and surmounted by busts, in a manner consistent with the arrangement of the principal front. This revision transformed the structure into what was effectively a monumental wall facade animated by sculptural elements. The previously planned smooth central band on the front, where an access portal had been located in earlier designs, was possibly replaced by a bronze relief. In the upper register, the catafalque was supplanted by a figure of the pope supported by two seated figures in a composition reminiscent of a Pietà, with a Madonna and Child positioned above in a niche.

Work on the tomb was soon interrupted by a commission from Pope Leo X to execute the tombs in the Basilica of San Lorenzo, Florence, a project that was later continued under Pope Clement VII. According to the biography written by Ascanio Condivi, Michelangelo presented his departure from the tomb project as a reluctant necessity, undertaken only at the insistence of Pope Leo X, who is reported to have intervened with the Della Rovere heirs to secure permission for the suspension: "Leave it to me to deal with them, for I will make them content." Condivi records that Michelangelo left the tomb "weeping" and returned to Florence, thereby seeking to disclaim responsibility for the project's interruption. However, contemporary correspondence indicates that Michelangelo was not notably reluctant to accept the new commission, suggesting that the account provided in Condivi's biography represents a deliberate rhetorical emphasis intended to exonerate the artist from any implication of willingly abandoning the tomb.

== Fourth project (1526) ==
Relations with the Della Rovere heirs grew increasingly strained during this period. In 1522, Francesco Maria della Rovere demanded the return of the advance payments that had been provided for the tomb, and in 1524 he threatened to initiate legal proceedings.

In response, Michelangelo prepared a fourth design in October 1526, which was rejected by the heirs. The precise configuration of this design is not documented, but, as reconstructed by Charles de Tolnay, it likely entailed further simplification. This version would have eliminated the depth required for the lateral niches, resulting in a structure with a purely frontal form. The design included a series of niches, with a seated statue of the pope positioned at the center. It has been suggested that this project incorporated certain architectural motifs derived from Michelangelo's contemporaneous studies for the facade of San Lorenzo in Florence, particularly in the arrangement of load-bearing elements and the counterbalancing of weights between the lower and upper registers.

== Fifth project (1532) ==
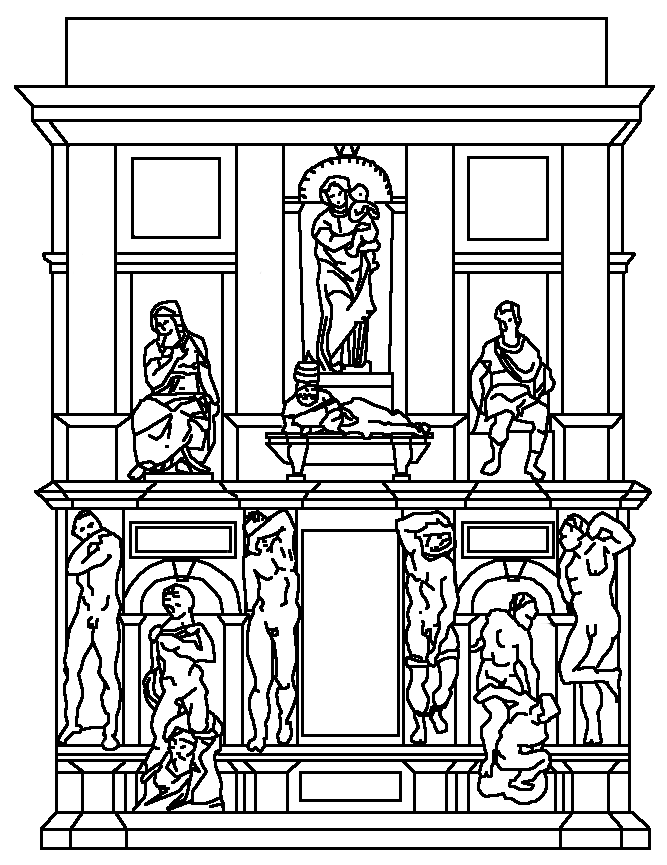
Hypothetical reconstruction of the 1532 project

Pope Clement VII subsequently intervened to mediate between Michelangelo and the Della Rovere heirs in order to reach a new agreement. On 29 April 1532, a new contract was signed, in which Michelangelo agreed to complete the monument within three years. The contract stipulated that the tomb was to be installed not in St. Peter's Basilica, as originally planned, but in San Pietro in Vincoli, and that marble already partially worked was to be employed. This material likely included the Genius of Victory and the four Prisoners now in the Galleria dell'Accademia: the Young Slave, the Bearded Slave, the Atlas Slave, and the Awakening Slave, which had been roughly carved and are generally dated to approximately 1525–1530. The model known as the Two Wrestlers, currently housed in the Casa Buonarroti, may have been a study for a figure intended to serve as a pendant to the Genius of Victory.

As with previous phases of the project, however, the statues were left incomplete. Although these partially worked pieces, together with sculptures produced earlier, would have been sufficient to complete the monument under the terms negotiated through papal mediation, Michelangelo did not fulfill the contractual requirements. Shortly afterward, he accepted a commission from Clement VII to paint the Last Judgment in the Sistine Chapel, a project that occupied him from 1534 to 1541. To relieve Michelangelo of his obligations to the Della Rovere heirs, Pope Paul III issued a motu proprio on 17 November 1536, formally releasing the artist from other commitments.

During the 1530s and into the early 1540s, the difficulties associated with the tomb project, later characterized by Michelangelo as the "tragedy of the Tomb," reached their height. The artist faced serious accusations that he had improperly retained substantial advance payments and had even engaged in usury with those funds. These charges, which carried severe implications, prompted vigorous efforts on Michelangelo's part to defend himself.

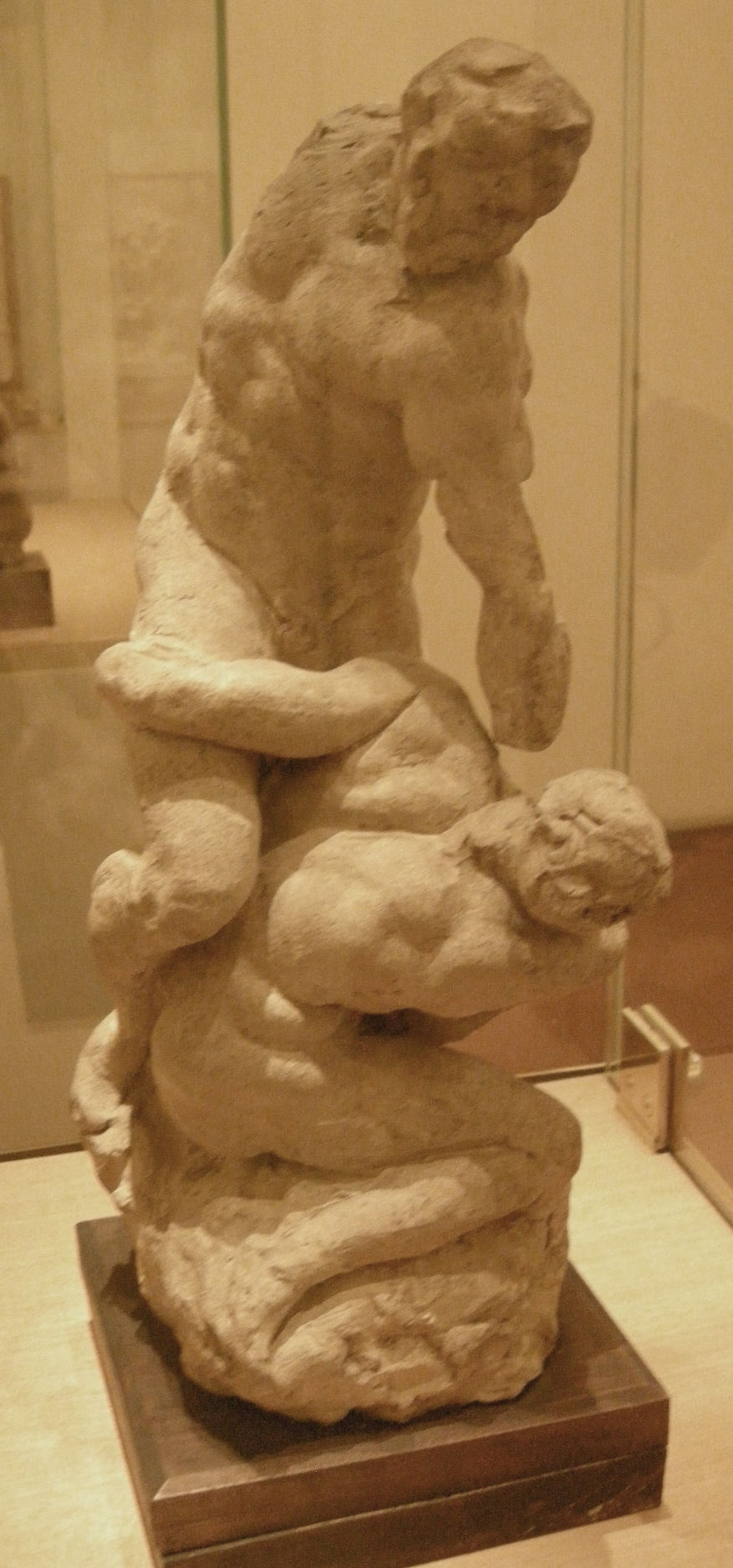
Model for an Hercules and Samson

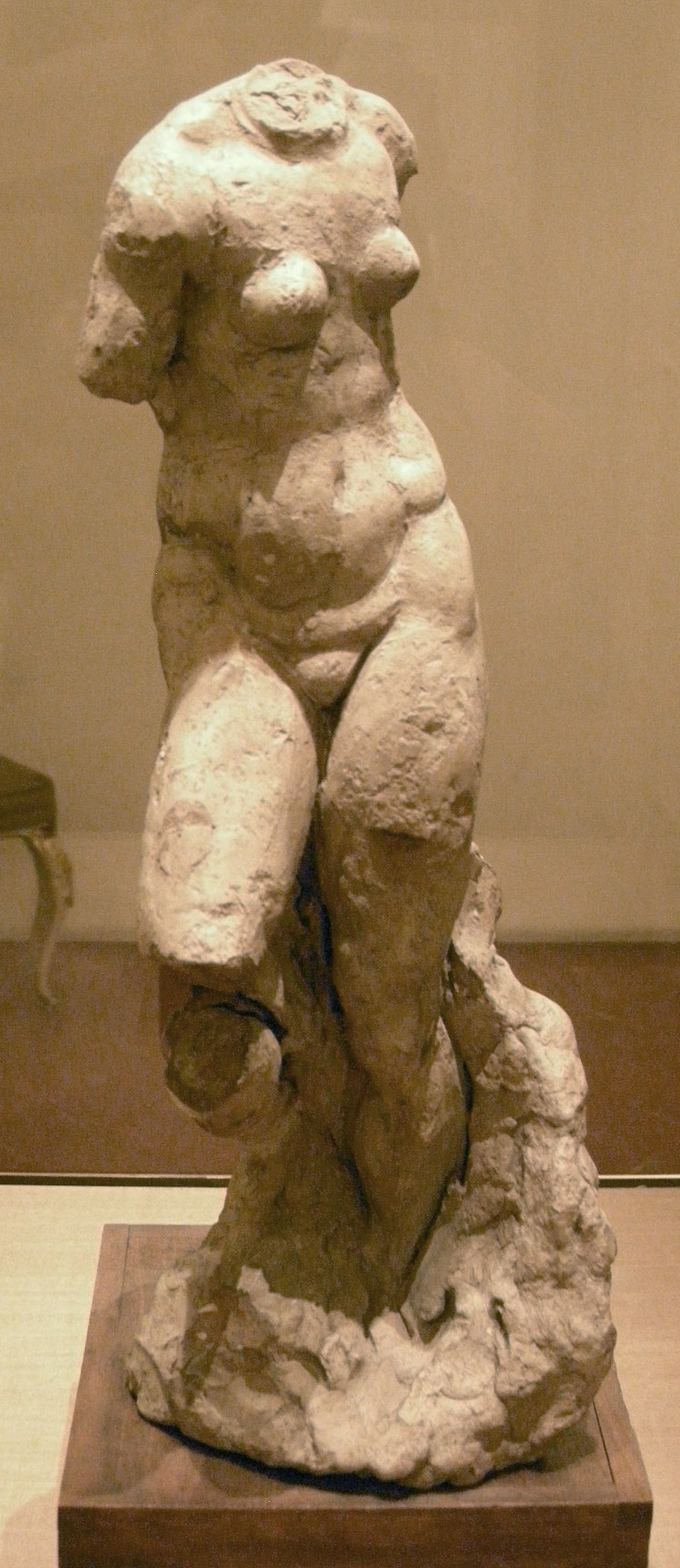
Rough model of a female figure, possibly for the Madonna and Child, Casa Buonarroti

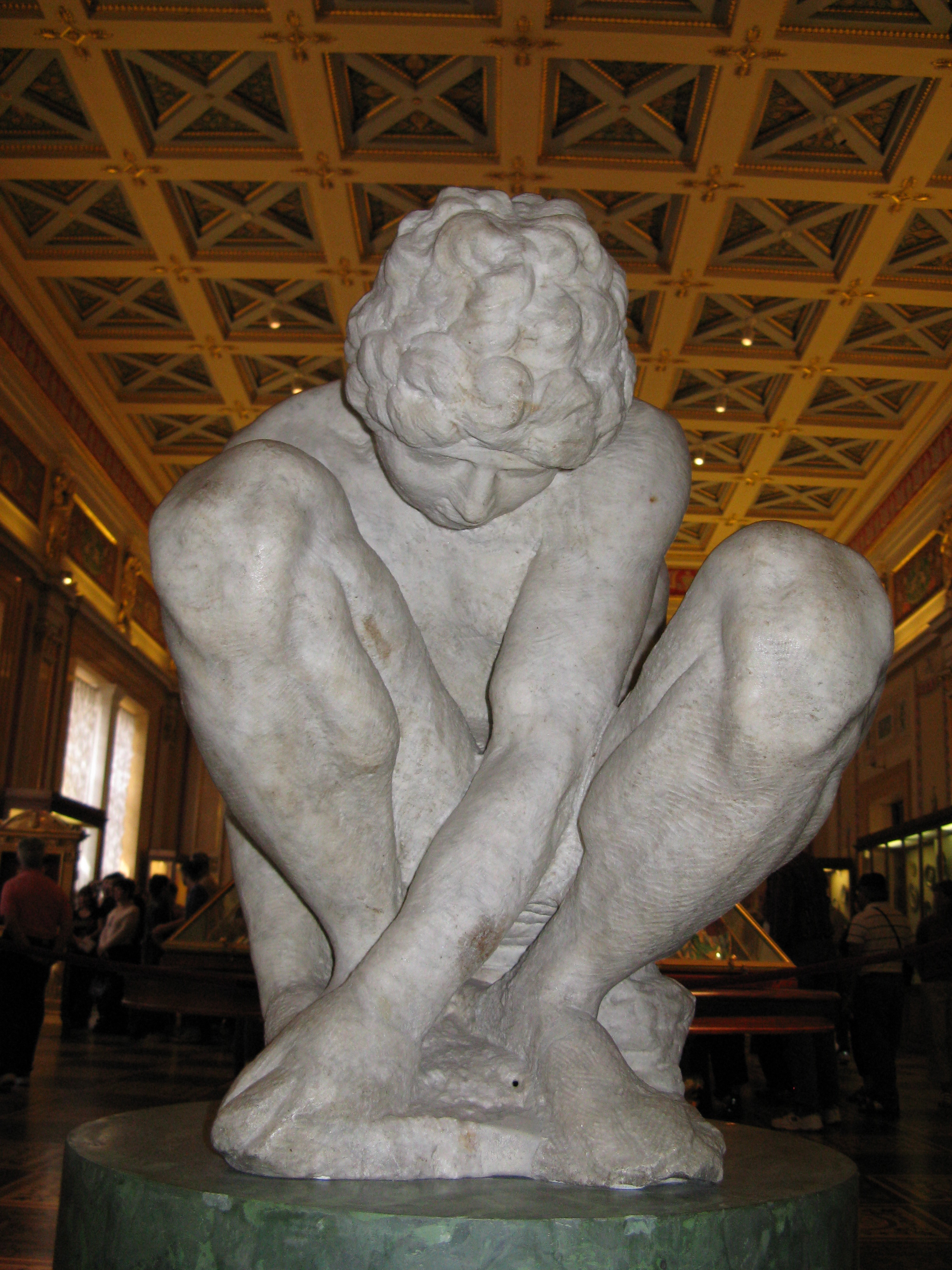
Crouching Boy

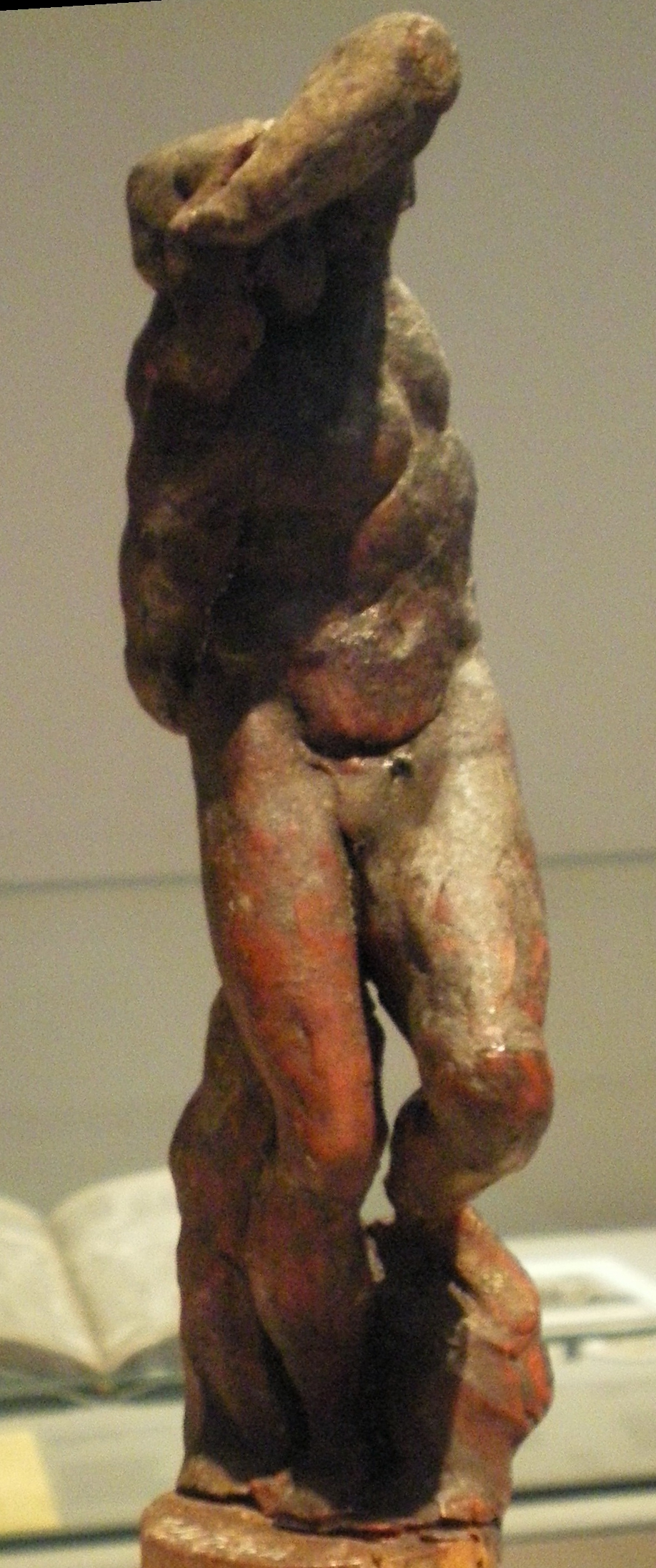
Rough model for the Young Slave, Victoria and Albert Museum

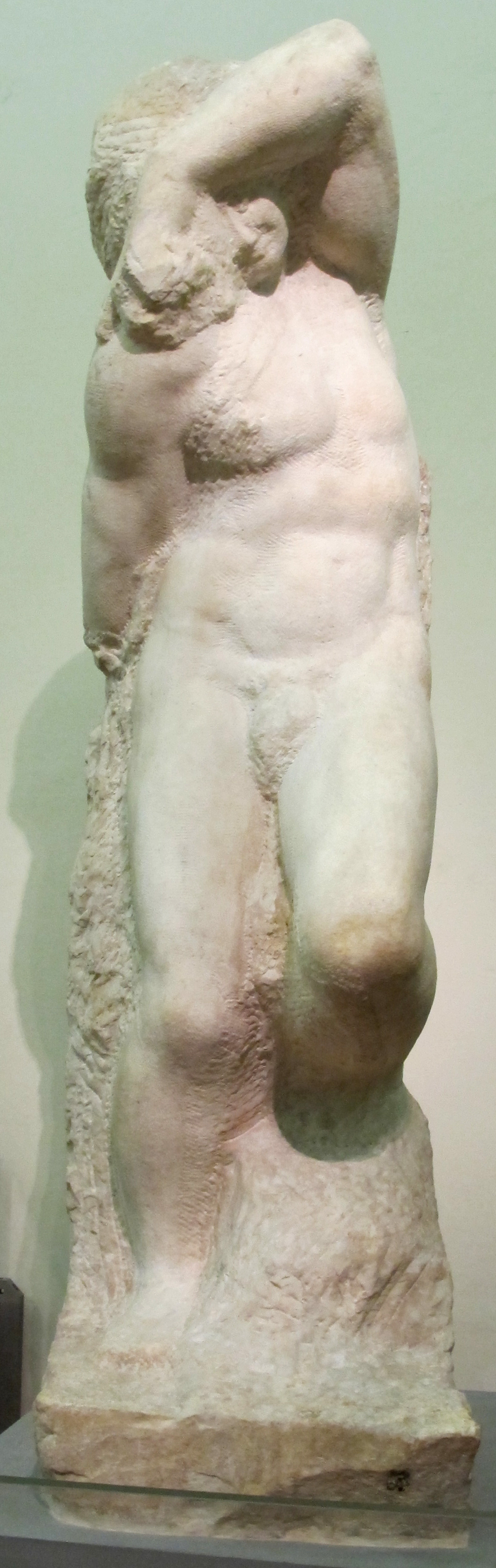
Young Slave

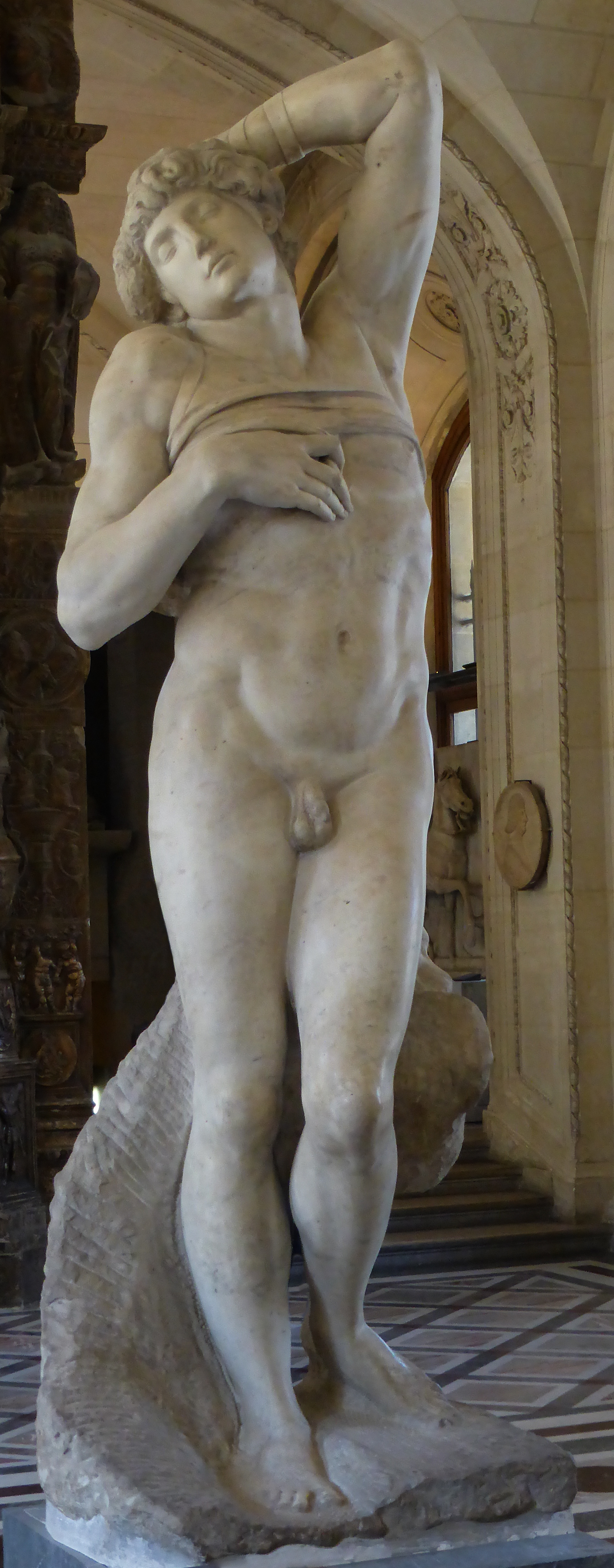
Dying Slave

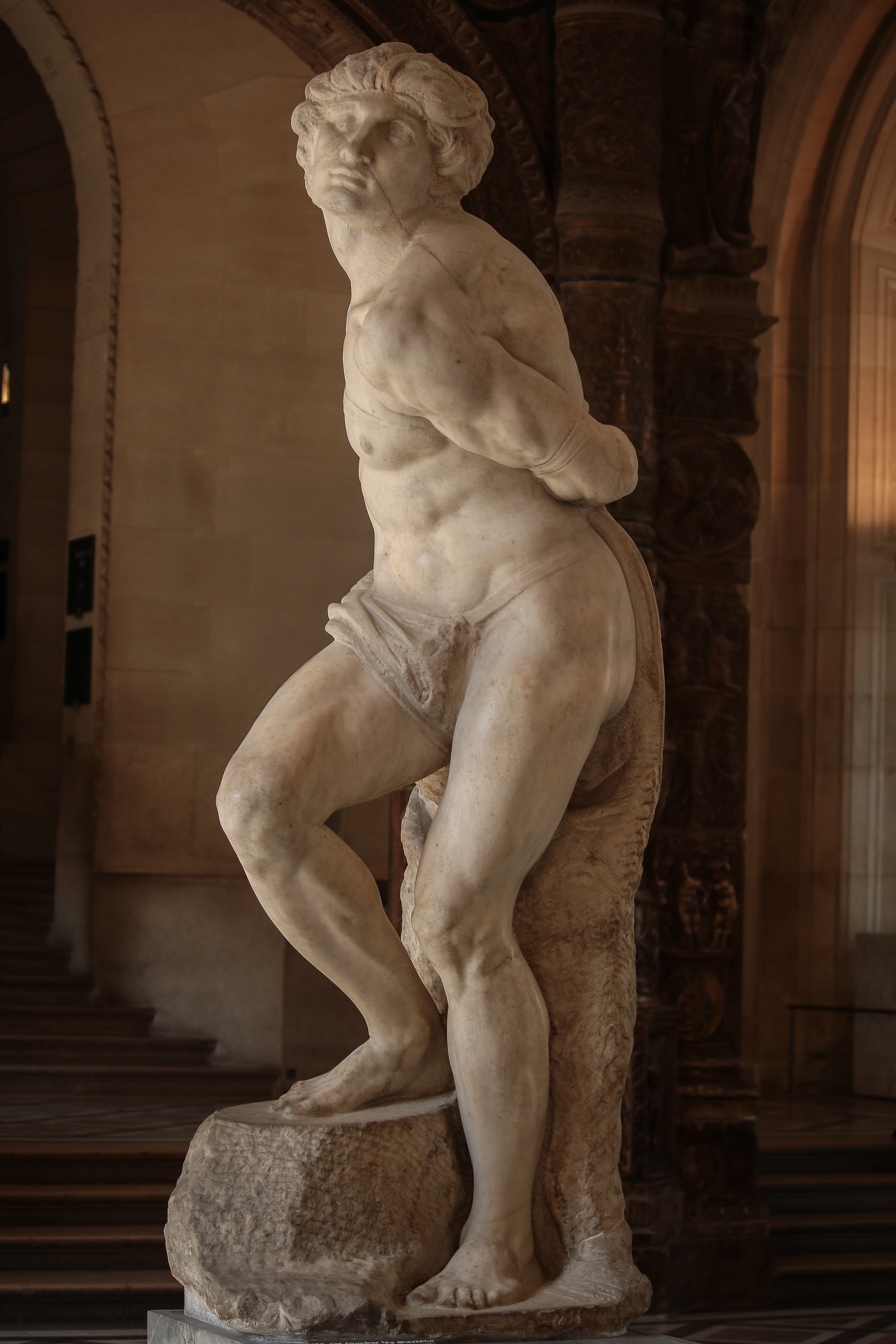
Rebellious Slave

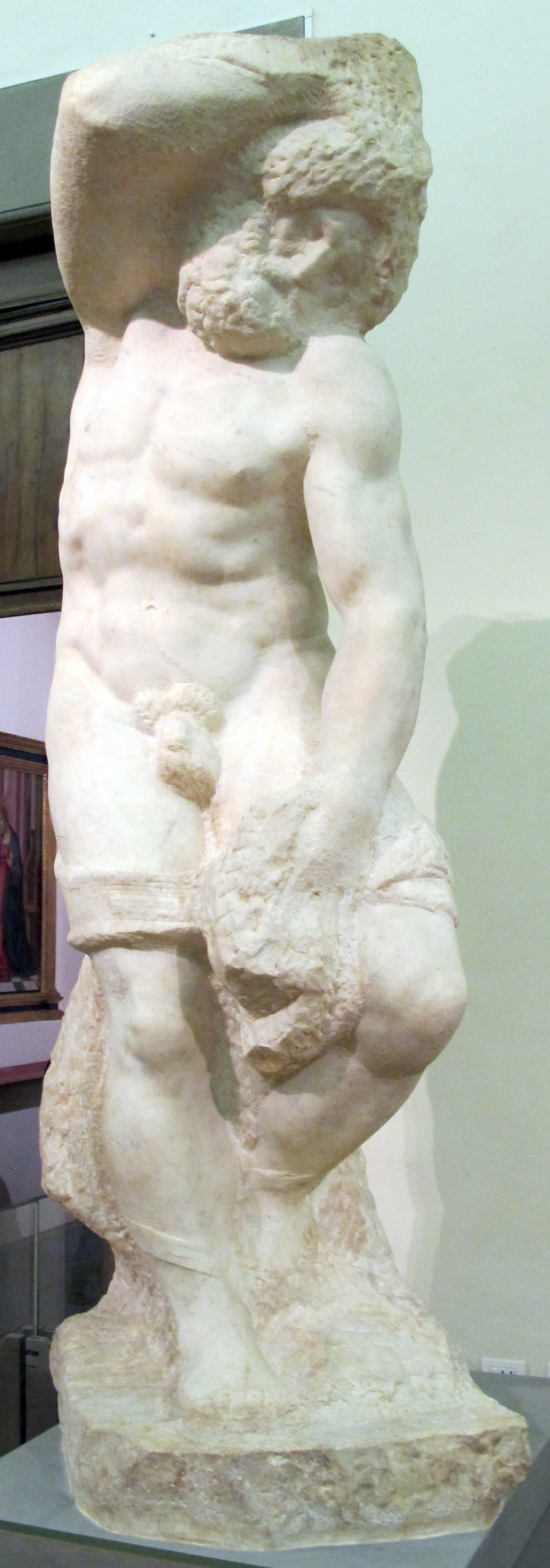
Bearded Slave

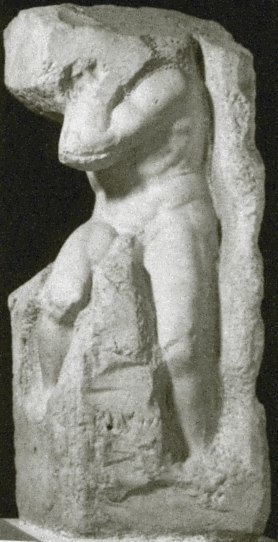
Atlas Slave

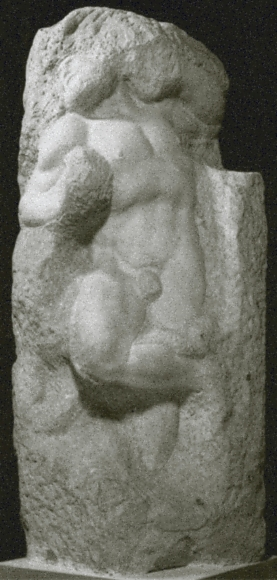
Awakening Slave

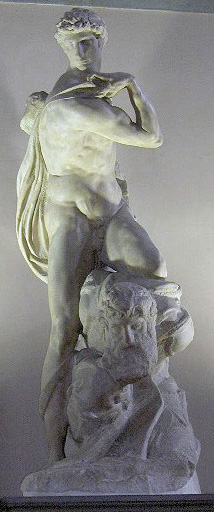
Genius of Victory

== Sixth and final project (1542–1545) ==
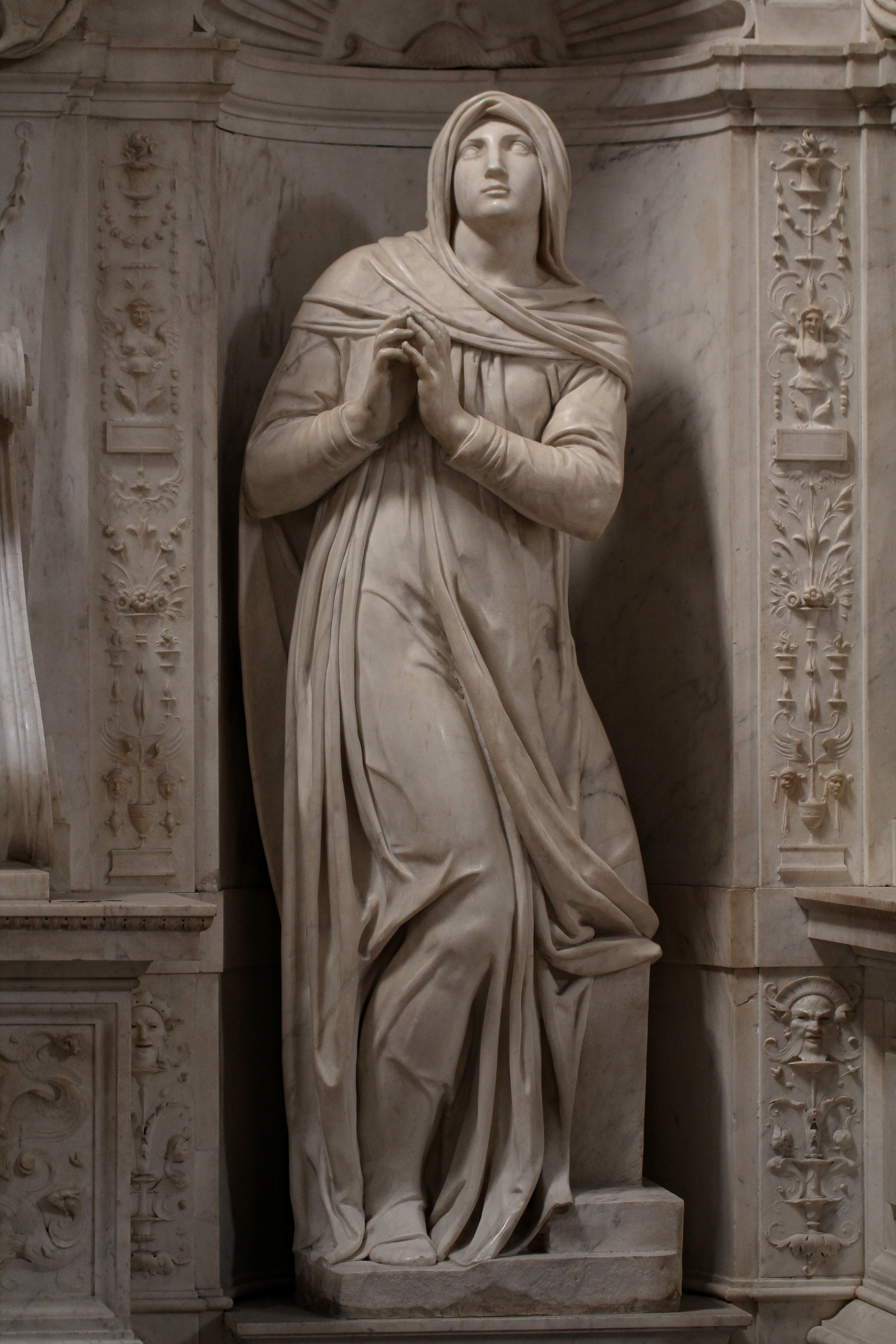
Rachel

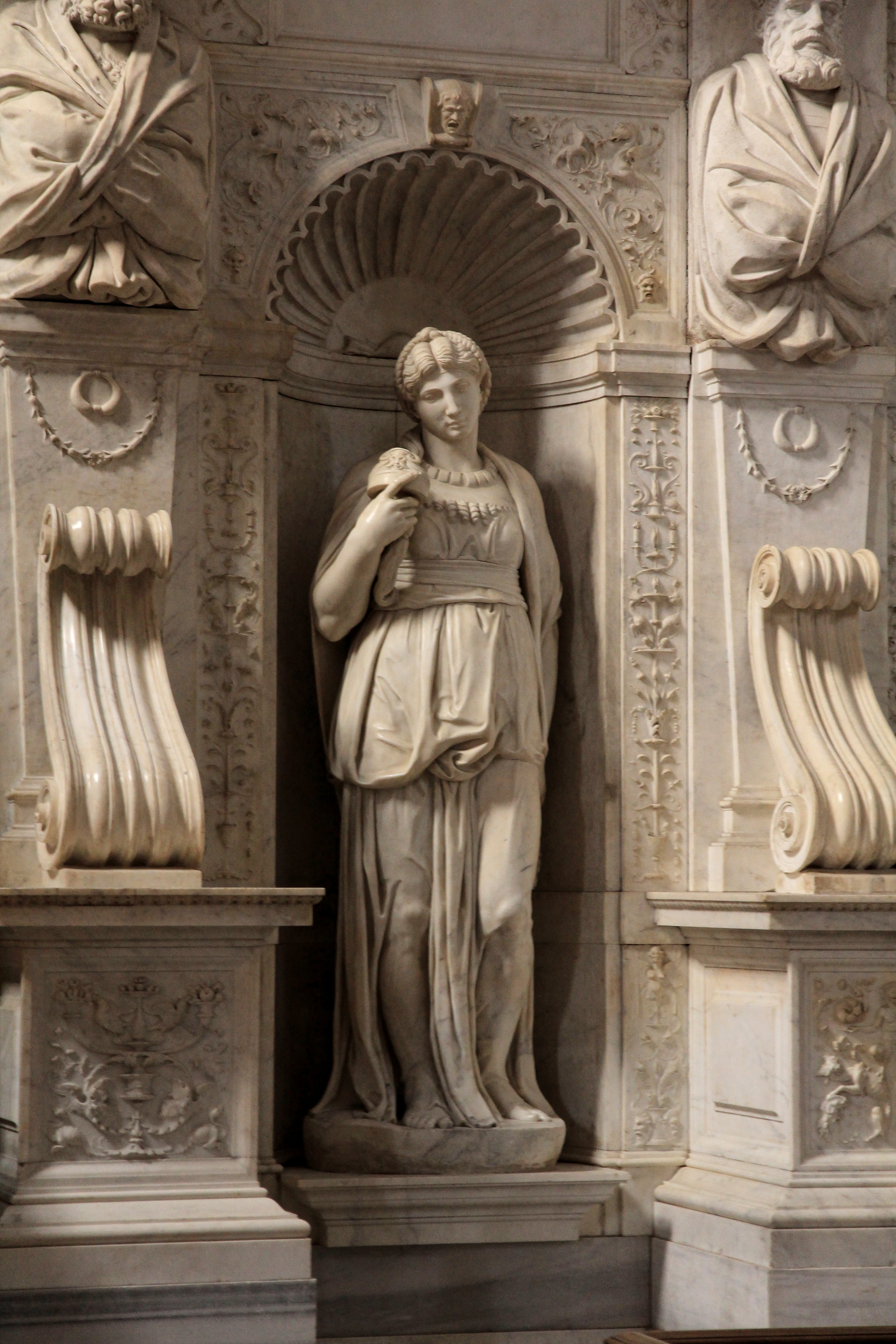
Leah

Following the completion of the Last Judgment, Pope Paul III intervened on 23 November 1541, persuading the heirs of Julius II, including Guidobaldo II della Rovere, to permit the completion of the tomb by other artists, subject to Michelangelo's supervision.

With earlier contractual obligations long since expired, a further contract was signed on 20 August 1542. This agreement marked the final phase of the project, as work on the monument proceeded and was brought to completion in 1545. The execution of the work relied extensively on assistants who followed Michelangelo's designs. Michelangelo himself incorporated the previously carved Moses at the center of the composition and personally sculpted the two female figures, Rachel and Leah, which represent respectively the contemplative life and the active life.

The architectural framework of the upper level was constructed by Giovanni di Marchesi and Francesco d'Urbino. Raffaello da Montelupo was responsible for completing the Madonna and Child, the Prophet, and the Sibyl, all of which had been partially carved by Michelangelo in 1537; however, owing to the sculptor's illness, the latter two figures were finished by Domenico Fancelli. The recumbent figure of the pope was executed by Tommaso Boscoli, while additional sculptural elements were produced by Donato Benti and Jacopo del Duca.

The resulting structure, while monumental in scale, bears little resemblance to the vast freestanding mausoleum originally envisioned nearly forty years earlier. Furthermore, the body of Pope Julius II was never transferred to the monument, which therefore functions solely as a cenotaph.

== Critical reception ==
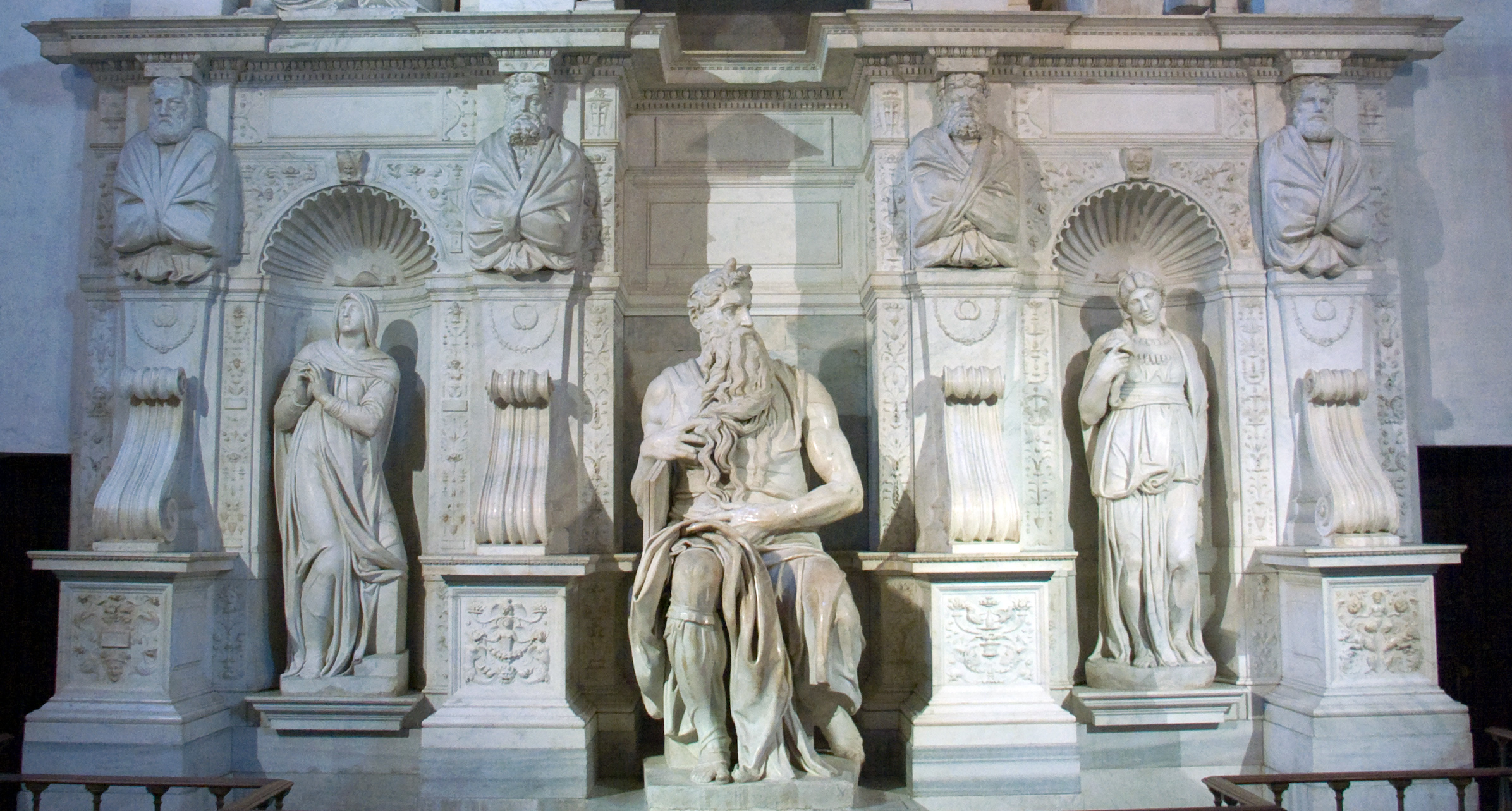
The lower half of the funerary monument in San Pietro in Vincoli

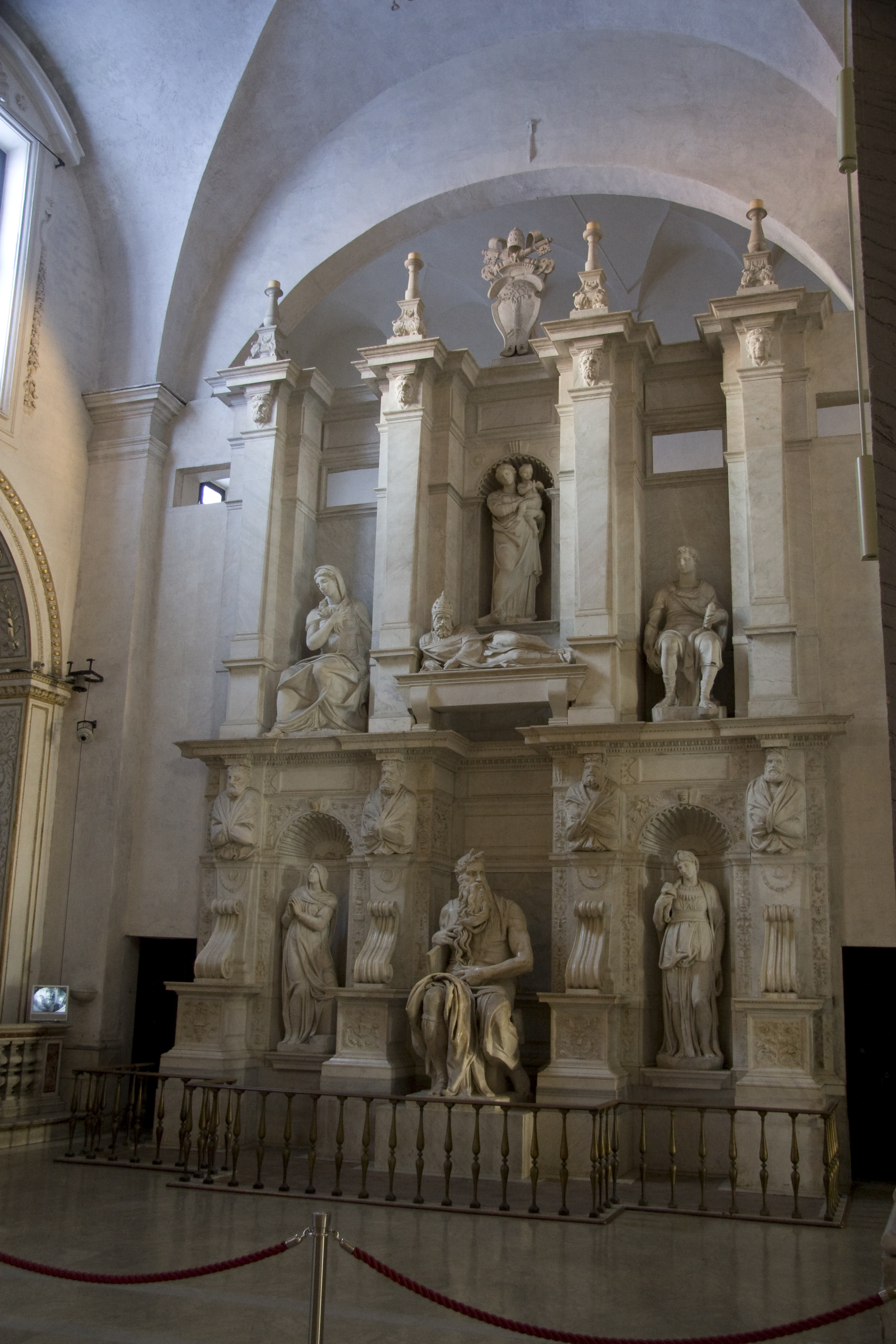
View in the nave of San Pietro in Vincoli

Following the completion of the monument, Michelangelo continued to face criticism from various sources, which held that the resulting structure fell short of expectations and was inadequate to commemorate a pope. In response to these accusations, the artist expressed considerable bitterness in his correspondence. In a letter written in 1542 to an unidentified recipient, he stated: "I find myself to have lost my entire youth bound to this tomb; [...] my excessive faith, which they refused to recognize, has ruined me; [...] for the love I bore this work, [...] I have been repaid with accusations of being a thief and usurer by ignorant people who were not even in the world [at the time]. I beg Your Lordship, when you have time, to read this story and keep it, and know that there are still witnesses to much of what is written. I would be pleased if the pope were to see it, and if the whole world were to see it, because I write the truth, and much less than what actually occurred, and I am not a thieving usurer, but a Florentine citizen, noble, and the son of an honorable man."

However, the artist's repeated claims that he had been financially ruined by the failure of the pope and his heirs to provide adequate funds are not supported by evidence concerning his personal wealth, which indicates that he received substantially more in payments than he acknowledged in his letters. Similarly, contemporary documents, including his own correspondence, suggest that he was not reluctant to accept other commissions, such as those from the Medici popes, including the projects for San Lorenzo and the frescoes in the Sistine Chapel. Consequently, the portrayal of Michelangelo as having resisted abandoning the tomb project out of unwavering dedication, such as the account of his leaving the work in tears, as described in the biography by Ascanio Condivi, appears to reflect an effort at self-justification. Condivi's text, which was almost certainly composed under Michelangelo's direction, was explicitly intended to counter the perceived inaccuracies and implicit criticisms contained in the first edition of Giorgio Vasari's Vite, published in 1550.

Criticism of the project extended beyond those directly involved and included figures such as the artist's friend Annibal Caro. A particularly severe condemnation came in a letter from Pietro Aretino in 1545, shortly after the monument's completion, in which Michelangelo was characterized as avaricious, ungrateful, and a thief. Some contemporaries even questioned Michelangelo's authorship of the figures Rachel and Leah, a view that persisted among later critics until documentary evidence confirming his responsibility for these sculptures was published in the nineteenth century.

Only with the passage of time, particularly through the publication of Condivi's biography and the second edition of Vasari's Vite in 1568, was Michelangelo able to present a more comprehensive defense of his involvement in the project. The characterization of the tomb as the "tragedy of the Tomb" thus reflects the extent to which the prolonged and contentious history of the commission affected the artist, contributing significantly to both his personal experience and his subsequent historical reputation.

== Bibliography ==
- Marinazzo, Adriano (2025). Michelangelo: The Genesis of the Sistine. Florence: Mandragora.
- Baldini, Umberto (1973). Michelangelo scultore [Michelangelo the Sculptor] (in Italian). Milan: Rizzoli.
- Alvarez Gonzáles, Marta (2007). Michelangelo. Milan: Mondadori Arte. ISBN 978-88-370-6434-1.
- Heusinger, Lutz (2001). Michelangelo [Michelangelo, in The Protagonists of Italian Art]. in I protagonisti dell'arte italiana. Florence: Scala Group. ISBN 8881170914.
