= Atlas Slave =

Statue by Michelangelo

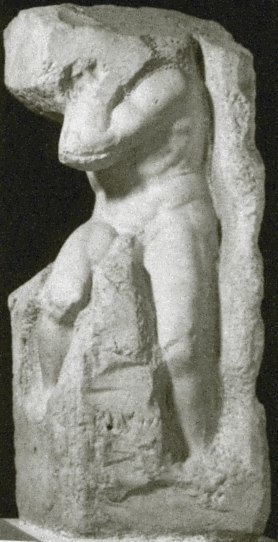
- The Atlas Slave
- Artist: Michelangelo
- Year: c. 1525–1530
- Type: sculpture
- Medium: marble
- Dimensions: 277 cm (109 in)
- Location: Galleria dell'Accademia; Florence
- Preceded by: Young Slave
- Followed by: Awakening Slave

The Atlas Slave is a 2.77m high marble statue by Michelangelo, dated to 1525–1530. It is one of the 'Prisoners', the series of unfinished sculptures for the tomb of Pope Julius II. It is now held in the Galleria dell'Accademia in Florence.

== History ==
Before the end of the first project for tomb of Pope Julius II (1505), a series of sculptures was planned for the lower part of the mausoleum. This series, the 'Prisoners', would be a number of larger-than-life statues chained up in various poses representing prisoners leaning on the pillars and herms which flanked the niches. As they were coupled with each niche (featuring images of Winged Victory), there were originally supposed to be sixteen or twenty sculptures. In later plans, this number was reduced to twelve (during the second project in 1513), eight (third project, 1516) and in the end perhaps as low as four (sometime during the fourth or fifth project in 1526 and 1532), before the sculptures were definitively removed from the final project plans in 1542.

The first sculptures in the series, of which there remain traces in Michelangelo's papers, are the two Prisoners of Paris, who (since the 19th Century) have come to be known as the "Slaves": the Dying Slave and the Rebellious Slave, both carved in Rome around the year 1513.

== See also ==
- List of works by Michelangelo
