= Awakening Slave =

Sculpture by Michelangelo

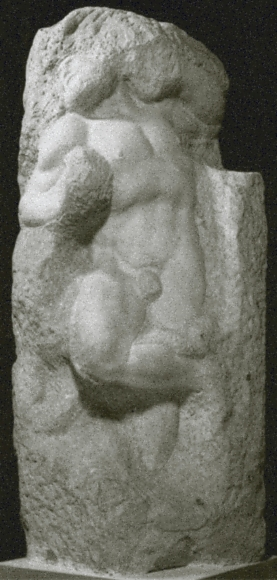
- The Awakening Slave
- Artist: Michelangelo
- Year: c. 1525–1530
- Type: sculpture
- Medium: marble
- Dimensions: 267 cm (105 in)
- Location: Galleria dell'Accademia; Florence
- Preceded by: Atlas Slave
- Followed by: Bearded Slave

The Awakening Slave is a 2.67m high marble statue by Michelangelo, dated to 1525–1530. It is one of the 'Prisoners', the series of unfinished sculptures for the tomb of Pope Julius II. It is now held in the Galleria dell'Accademia in Florence.

It seems that from the first project for the tomb of Julius II (1505) in the lower register of the mausoleum were planned a series of "Prisons", that is, a series of statues larger than life of figures chained in various poses as prisoners, precisely, to be placed on the pillars that framed niches and topped with Hermes. Paired with each niche (in which a winged victory was planned) they were to initially be sixteen or twenty, being gradually reduced in the projects that followed, to twelve (second project, 1513), eight (third project, 1516) and finally perhaps only four (perhaps from the fourth or fifth project, 1526 and 1532), and then definitively eliminated in the final project of 1542.

The first of the series, of which traces can be found in Michelangelo's chart, are the two Prisons of Paris, called from the nineteenth century "Slaves": the Dying Slave and the Rebel Slave. They were carved in Rome around 1513.

The Florentine Prisons (Young Slave, Bearded Slave, Atlas, Slave who is reamed) may have been carved in the second half of the 1520s, while the master was engaged at San Lorenzo in Florence (but historians have proposed dating ranging from 1519 to 1534). It is known that they were in the artist's workshop in Via Mozza again in 1544, when Michelangelo's nephew, Leonardo Buonarroti, asked permission to sell them (Michelangelo did not set foot in Florence again after 1534). The permit was denied and only in 1564 they were donated, with the Genius of Victory, to Grand Duke Cosimo I who then placed them at the four corners of the Cave of Buontalenti, by 1591.

From there they were removed in 1908 to gather them at the michelangiolesco corpus that was forming in the Florentine Gallery.

As for the dating Justi (and others) they proposed 1519 on the basis of a letter of 13 February in which Jacopo Salviati promised Cardinal Aginesis, heir to Julius II, that the sculptor would perform four figures for the tomb by the summer of that year; Wilde the 1523, referring to a hint of Cardinal Giulio de' Medici (future Clement VII)who would see them before leaving for Rome on that date; finally de Tolnay gave them to 1530–1534, based on style, frequent references to unfinished sculptures for the tomb of Pope Julius in the paperwork of 1531-1532 and on the basis of the pottery mention that they were made while the artist prepared the cardboard of the Universal Judgment.

== See also ==
- List of works by Michelangelo
