= Charles de Tolnay =

Hungarian art historian

Charles de Tolnay, born Károly von Tolnai (May 27, 1899 – January 17, 1981), was a Hungarian art historian and an expert on Northern Renaissance art and, latterly, Michelangelo. According to Erwin Panofsky, he was "one of the most brilliant art historians" of his time. From 1939 he was based in the United States, where he became a citizen in 1945. After some years each at Princeton and Columbia, he headed the Casa Buonarroti in Florence from 1965.

== Life and work ==
De Tolnay was born in Budapest. He was the son of Arnold von Tolnai, an official of the Hungarian administration. In 1918, he began studying art history and archaeology as Karl Tolnai in Germany, first at the University of Berlin (under Adolph Goldschmidt), then at the University of Frankfurt (under Rudolf Kautzsch).

During these early years he was also a keen traveller. Between 1921 and 1922 he made his first trip to Belgium, visiting Brussels, Antwerp, Leuven, Ghent, Bruges, and Liege. In 1923 he went to Paris, Occitania, Spain, Lisbon, Turin, Milan and Venice. In 1924 he made a hundred-day journey to Italy, visiting Florence and Rome, where he was struck by the art of Michelangelo.

He continued studying art history at the University of Vienna (under Julius von Schlosser and Max Dvořák), where he wrote a Ph.D. thesis on Hieronymus Bosch (1925).

In 1928 he became lecturer at the University of Hamburg and a friend of the young Erwin Panofsky. There Tolnay wrote his Habilitationsschrift on Michelangelo's late architecture (1929). He then moved to Rome, where he did much research at the Bibliotheca Hertziana. Between 1934 and 1939, he taught art history at the Sorbonne, Paris, where he changed his name to Charles de Tolnay. In 1939, he immigrated to the United States, where he became a citizen in 1945, working at the Institute for Advanced Study, Princeton, New Jersey, for some years. According to Ernest H. Wilkins, "Of the many specialists resident at the Institute for Advanced Study, probably none is a more tireless investigator than Charles de Tolnay, Hungarian-born authority on Renaissance art." In 1953, Tolnay was appointed professor of art history at Columbia University, where he retired in 1965. In the same year, he became Director of the Casa Buonarroti in Florence, which he helped to reorganize.

He wrote fundamental studies on Flemish painting, in particular Bosch, Jan van Eyck and the Master of Flémalle, Hugo van der Goes and Peter Paul Rubens, but also on the painting of Rembrandt and Jan Vermeer. From 1943 on, his attention focused on Michelangelo, which resulted in a 5-volume study on his work, which has been called "the biggest, most learned study of Michelangelo in our generation". Also important are his writings on the court of Matthias Corvinus, King of Hungary and Croatia, and the works of Bicci di Lorenzo, Masaccio, Filippo Lippi, Domenico Ghirlandaio, Raphael, Leonardo da Vinci, Tintoretto, Pontormo, Diego Velázquez, Nicolas Poussin, Antoine Watteau, Eugène Delacroix, Paul Cézanne, and others.

Tolnay died on January 17, 1981, in Florence.

According to Erwin Panofsky, Tolnay "excels by a rare combination of constructive scientific imagination and thorough connoisseurship ... Thanks to his extraordinary energy, Dr. v. Tolnay has greatly promoted our knowledge of Bosch, Breughel, and most particularly Michelangelo."

According to Ernest Manheim, "everybody liked Tolnay because he had very interesting opinions. He was looking for a connection between art history, art analysis, and sociology".

== Select publications ==
- Die Zeichnungen Pieter Bruegels. Munich 1925.
- Die späten architektonischen Projekte Michelangelos. Hamburg, 1929.
- Pierre Bruegel l'ancien. 2 vols. Brussels, 1935.
- Hieronymus Bosch. Basel, 1937.
- Le Maître de Flémalle et les freres Van Eyck. Brussels, 1939.
- History and Technique of Old Master Drawings: A Handbook. New York, 1943.
- Michelangelo. 5 vols. Princeton, 1943-1960.
- Hieronymus Bosch. London, 1966.
- Nuove osservazioni sulla Cappella medicea. Rome, 1968.
- Il riordinamento delle collezioni della casa Buonarroti a Firenze. Rome, 1969.
- L'omaggio a Michelangelo di Albrecht Dürer. Rome, 1970.
- L'"Ultimo" ritratto di Galileo Galilei. Rome, 1975.
- Corpus dei disegni di Michelangelo. Novara, 1975-1980.
