= Rebellious Slave =

Sculpture by Michelangelo

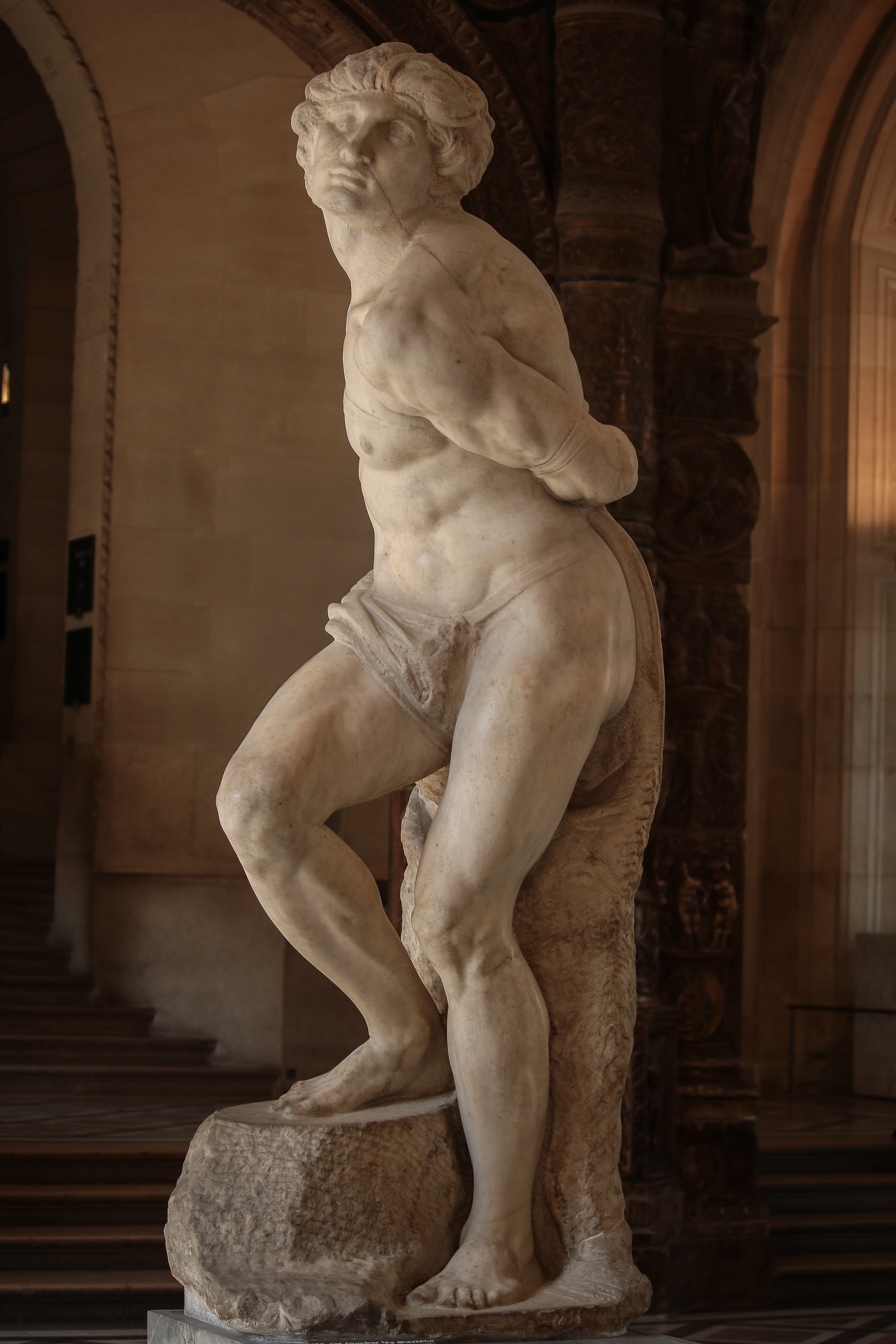
- Artist: Michelangelo
- Year: 1513
- Type: sculpture
- Medium: Marble
- Dimensions: 215 cm (85 in)
- Location: Louvre; Paris
- Preceded by: Moses (Michelangelo)
- Followed by: Dying Slave

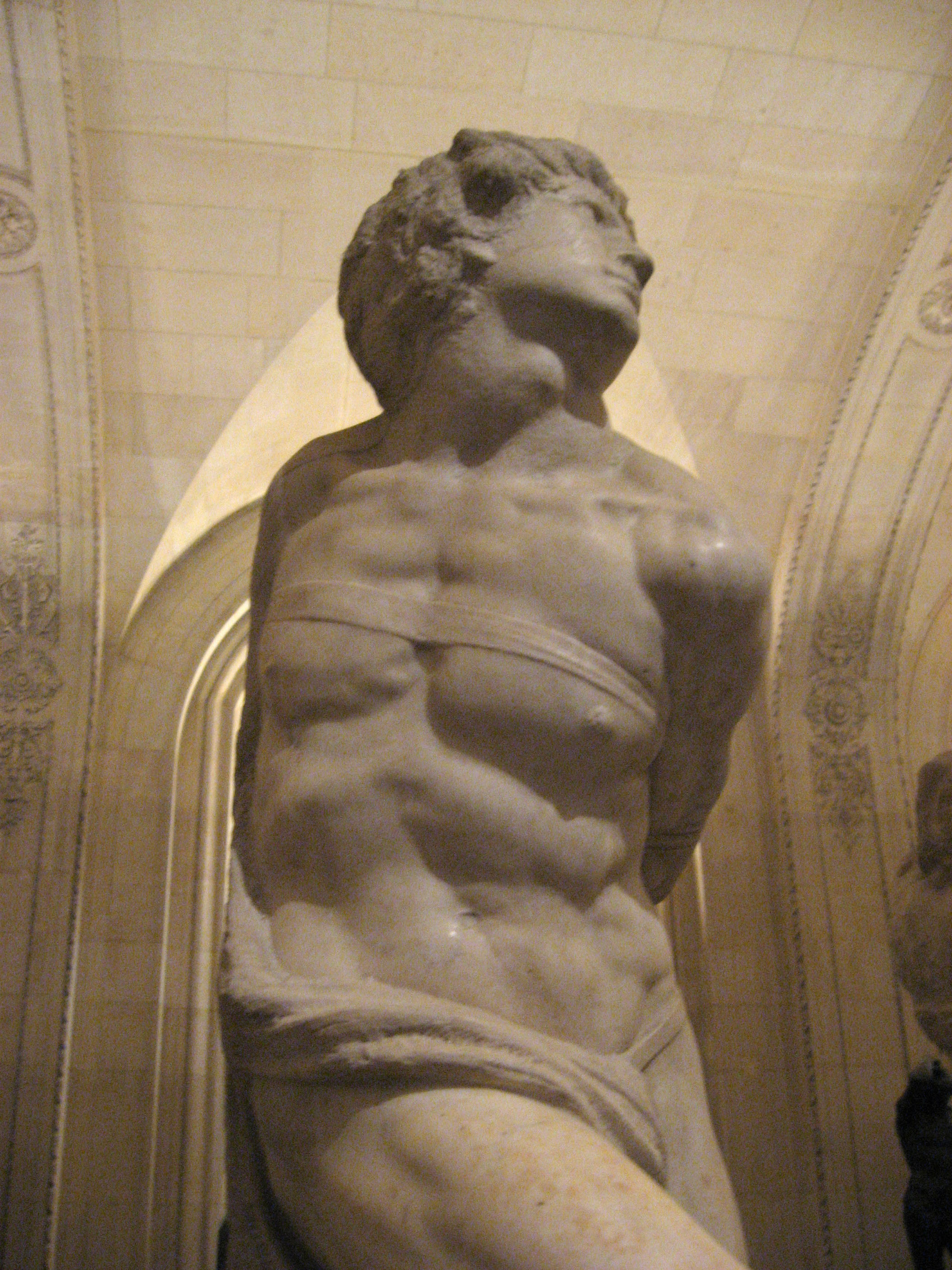
Detail

The Rebellious Slave is a 2.15m high marble statue by Michelangelo, dated to 1513. It is now held in the Louvre in Paris.

== History ==
The two "slaves" of the Louvre date to the second version of the tomb of Pope Julius II which was commissioned by the Pope's heirs, the Della Rovere in May 1513. Although the initial plans for a gigantic mausoleum were set aside, the work was still monumental, with a corridor richly decorated with sculpture and Michelangelo was immediately put in charge of the work. Among the first pieces completed were the two Prigioni (renamed the "slaves" only in the nineteenth century), destined for the lower part of the funerary monument, next to the pilasters which framed the niches containing the Victories. Their poses were determined by the needs of this architectural setting, so from the front they have great effect, but the side views received less care than usual.

The date of the two statues is confirmed by a letter of Michelangelo to Marcello dei Covi, in which he speaks of a viewing by Luca Signorelli in his Roman house, while he worked on "a figure of marble, standing four cubits high, which has its hands behind its back".

All the Prigioni produced in the studio of the artist were eliminated from the monument in its final version, completed in 1542. In 1546 Michelangelo gave the two works in the Louvre to Roberto Strozzi, for his generous hospitality in his Roman house during Michelangelo's periods of sickness in July 1544 and June 1546. When Strozzi was exiled to Lyon in April 1550 for his opposition to Cosimo I de' Medici, he had the two statues sent ahead. In April 1578 they were put on view in two niches in the courtyard of the castle of the constable of Montmorency at Écouen, near Paris.

In 1632 they were sold by Henri II de Montmorency to Cardinal Richelieu, who had them sent to his Château in Poitou, where they were seen by Gianlorenzo Bernini who made an illustration of them, on his travels.

In 1749, the Duke of Richelieu had them taken to Paris and placed in the Pavillon de Hanovre. They were hidden in 1793, but when the widow of the last Marshal of Richelieu attempted to put them on sale, they became property of the government and joined the collection which is now in the Louvre.

== Description and style ==
The "Rebellious Slave" is portrayed trying to free himself from the fetters which hold his hands behind his back, contorting his torso and twisting his head. The impression given, which would have contributed to the spatial appearance of the monument, was that he was moving towards the viewer, with his raised shoulder and knee.

The iconographic significance of the two figures is probably linked to the motif of the Captive in Roman art; in fact Giorgio Vasari identified them as personifications of the provinces controlled by Julius II. For Ascanio Condivi, however, they symbolised the Arts taken prisoner after the death of pontif. The Rebellious Slave in particular might, speculatively, represent sculpture or architecture. Other meanings of a symbolic and philosophical nature have been suggested as well as some linked to Michelangelo's personal life and his "torments".

From a stylistic point of view, they are based on ancient models, particularly Hellenistic sculpture, like the statue group of Laocoön and His Sons, discovered in 1506 and at that time in Michelangelo's possession, but also the sculptural friezes on the triumphal arches of Rome and depictions of Saint Sebastian.

== Bibliography ==
- Umberto Baldini. Michelangelo scultore. Rizzoli, Milano 1973.
- Marta Alvarez Gonzáles. Michelangelo. Mondadori Arte, Milano 2007. ISBN 978-88-370-6434-1

== See also ==
- Dying Slave
- Tomb of Pope Julius II
- List of works by Michelangelo
