= Pietà for Vittoria Colonna =

1538–1544 drawing by Michelangelo

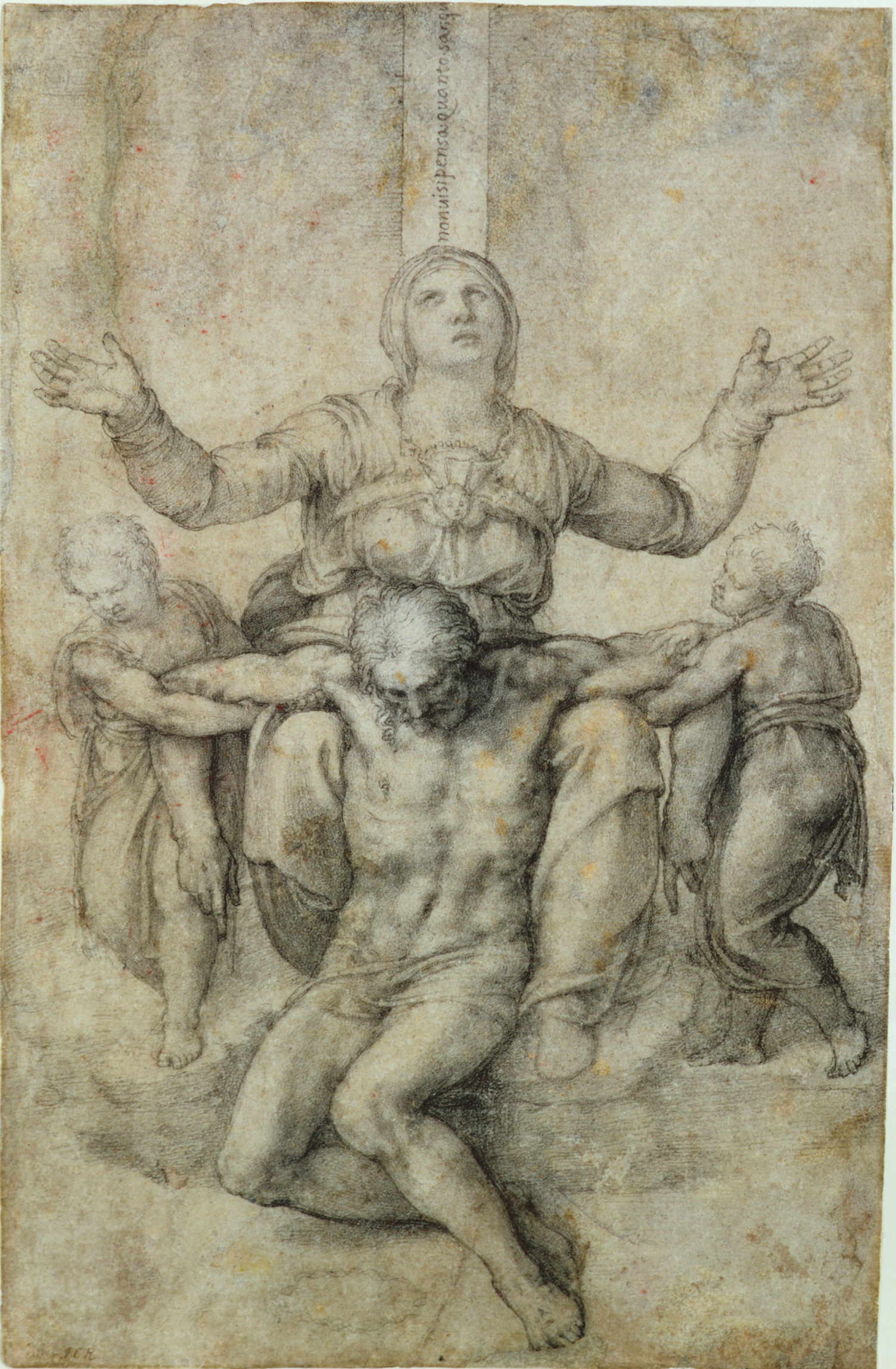
- Artist: Michelangelo Buonarroti
- Year: about 1538–1544
- Medium: Black Chalk on Paper
- Dimensions: 28.9 cm × 18.9 cm (11.4 in × 7.4 in)
- Location: Isabella Stewart Gardner Museum, Boston

The Pietà for Vittoria Colonna is a black chalk drawing on paper (28.9×18.9 cm) attributed to Michelangelo Buonarroti, dated to about 1538–1544 and kept at the Isabella Stewart Gardner Museum in Boston.

== History ==
Michelangelo became acquainted with Vittoria Colonna around 1538. Their lively friendship gained Michelangelo admission to her social circles, and he became acquainted with issues of church reform. For Colonna, Michelangelo executed several paintings in the fifth decade of the sixteenth century. All of them are now lost or of controversial attribution, but several sketches and copies by students and admirers of Michelangelo have been preserved.

Apart from a famous Crucifixion, Michelangelo's most notable work for Vittoria Colonna is a Pietà, of which a remarkable drawing is exhibited at Boston. It is not certain that this work was painted by Michelangelo, but it is described by Ascanio Condivi. It has at any rate proved influential: There are several copies by students of lesser skill in Florence and Rome, a reworking by Ludovico Buti and an adaptation by Lavinia Fontana.

In 2007, the Milanese restaurator and art historian Antonio Forcellino announced that an oil painting of the same subject had been discovered in a private home in Rochester, New York. The painting had come to the U.S. in 1883 and had hung over the fireplace of a middle-class family home until the 1970s. In a 2011 book, The Lost Michelangelos, Forcellino expresses the opinion that the painting is Michelangelo's. This attribution is not yet widely shared. According to Kristina Herrmann Fiore, a curator at the Borghese Gallery in Rome, the painting's underdrawing is conceivably by the hand of Michelangelo, whereas Alexander Nagel, a professor at New York University Institute of Fine Arts believes that the painting is merely a copy of a composition by Michelangelo.

== Description and style ==
The theme of the Pietà, so dear to the sculptor Michelangelo, is addressed in a highly emotional composition, as in the Crucifixion for Colonna. The dead Jesus is cradled between the grieving Mary's legs, who raises her arms to heaven as two angels also raise Christ's arms at right angles. Mary's gesture balances the forceful vertical lines of Jesus' body, which lies on a rock. Above the two stands a beam, the Cross, on which is inscribed, vertically, a quotation by Dante: Non vi si pensa quanto sangue costa – "There they don't think of how much blood it costs".

In this verse from canto 29 of the Paradiso, Beatrice deplores the lack of appreciation for the martyrs' sacrifices. The quote reflects Michelangelo's and Colonna's religious convictions. Both belonged to Roman groups that focused on achieving salvation by faith through prayerful contemplation of sacred history, as does their poetry of this period. "Michelangelo’s gift", according to James M. Saslow, "thus offered consoling testimony to their shared conviction that the savior’s tragic death is also a cause for joy, the climax of God’s divine comedy that offers each believing soul the hope of a happy ending."

== Gallery of other versions ==
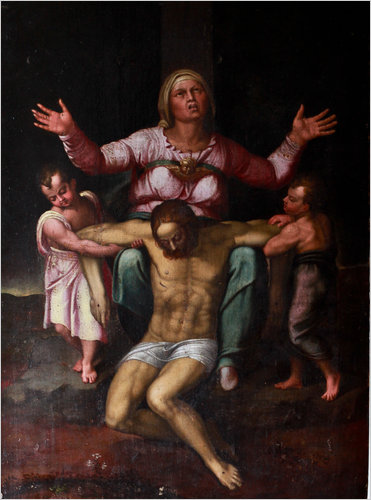
The Rochester Pietà

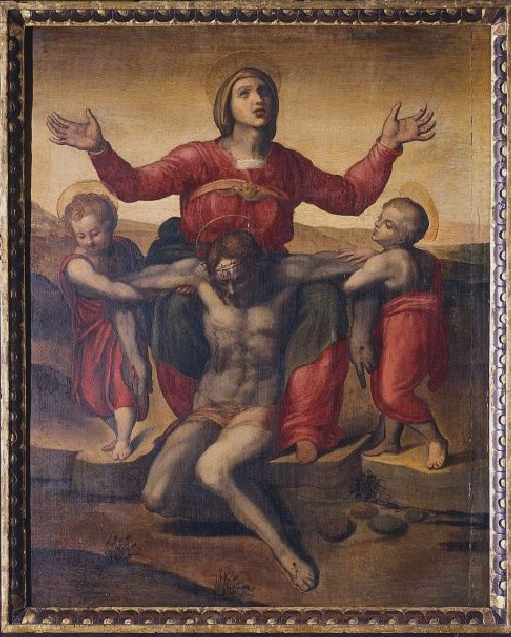
The Florence Pietà

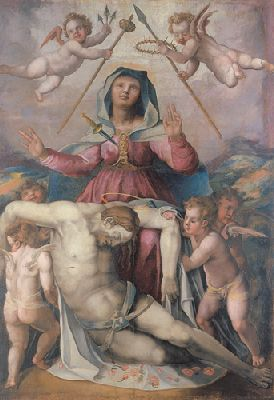
The Pietà by Ludovico Buti

== See also ==
- List of works by Michelangelo

== Bibliography ==
- Antonio Forcellino, The Lost Michelangelos, trans. Lucinda Byatt, Blackwell Pub., 2011, ISBN 978-0-7456-5203-0
- Lutz Heusinger, Michelangelo, in I protagonisti dell'arte italiana, Scala Group, Firenze 2001. ISBN 88-8117-091-4
- James M. Saslow, "Pietà," in Eye of the Beholder, ed. by Alan Chong et al. (Boston: ISGM and Beacon Press, 2003), p. 81.
