= Piccolomini (disambiguation) =

Piccolomini is the name of an Italian noble family, prominent in Siena from the beginning of the 13th century.

Piccolomini may also refer to:

== People ==
- Alessandro Piccolomini (1508–1579), Italian humanist and philosopher
- Ascanio I Piccolomini (died 1597), archbishop of Siena 1588-1597
- Ascanio II Piccolomini (1590–1671), archbishop of Siena 1629-1671
- Costanza d'Avalos Piccolomini (died 1560), duchess of Amalfi
- Enea Silvio Piccolomini (general) (ca.1640–1689), Italian nobleman
- Enea Silvio Bartolomeo Piccolomini, better known as Pope Pius II
- Francesco Piccolomini (Jesuit), Italian Jesuit
- Francesco Todeschini Piccolomini (1439-1503), better known as Pope Pius III
- Giovanni Piccolomini (1475–1537), Italian papal legate and Cardinal
- Jacopo Piccolomini-Ammannati (1422-1479), also known as Giacomo Piccolomini, Italian Renaissance cardinal and humanist
- Joachim Piccolomini (1258-1305), also known as Joachim of Siena or Giovacchino Piccolomini, Italian Servite tertiary from Siena
- María Carla Piccolomini (born 1980), Argentine politician
- Marietta Piccolomini (1834-1899), Italian soprano
- Ottavio Piccolomini (1599–1656), Italian Fieldmarshal

== Other ==
- Palazzo Piccolomini, Pienza, Italy
- Piccolomini (crater), a prominent lunar impact crater
- Piccolomini Altarpiece, an altarpiece in Siena Cathedral, Siena, Italy
- Piccolomini Library, in the Cathedral of Siena, Italy
- Mass in C major, K. 258 by Wolfgang Amadeus Mozart, sometimes known as the Piccolomini Mass
