= Leah (sculpture) =

Sculpture by Michelangelo

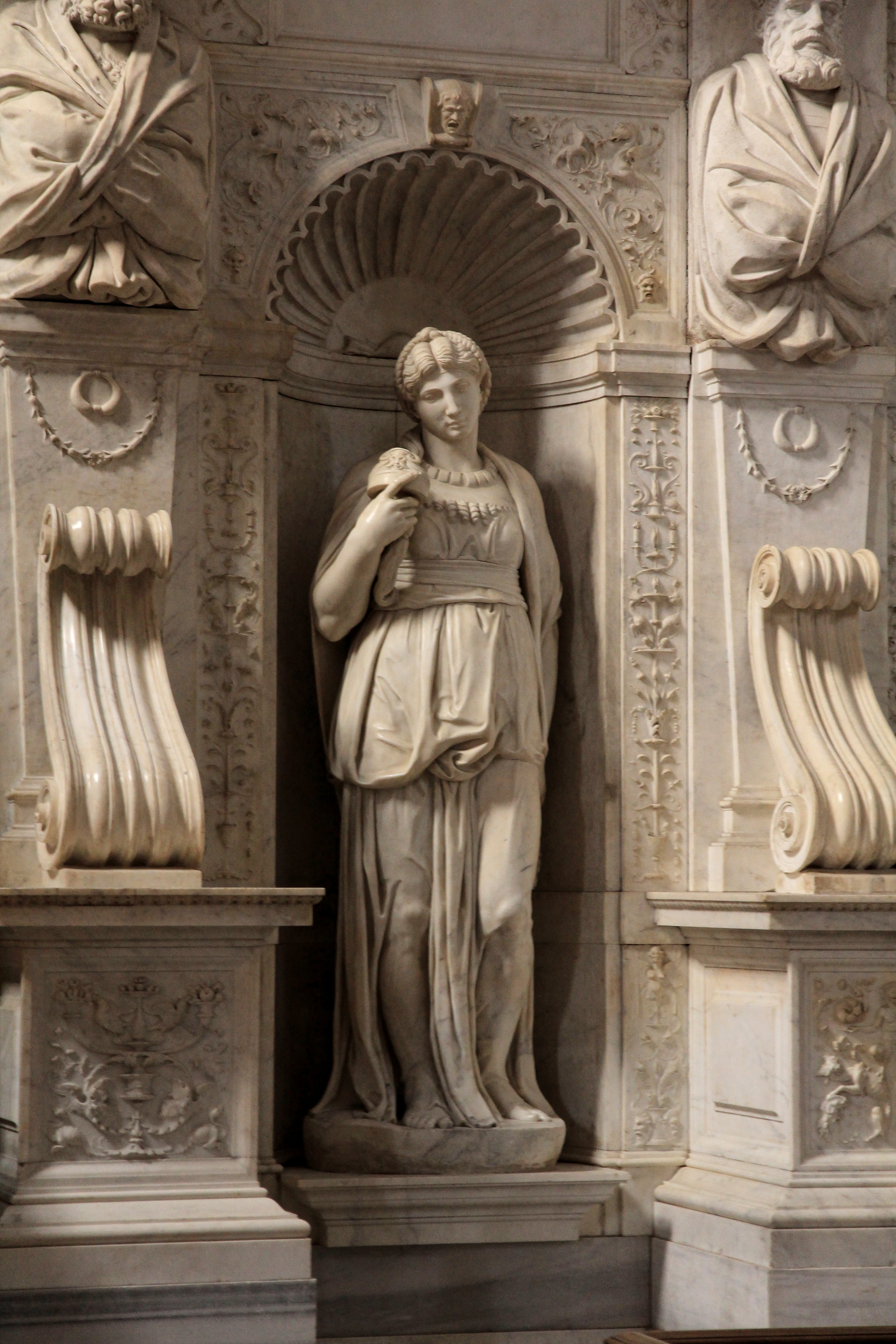
- Artist: Michelangelo
- Year: c. 1542
- Medium: Marble
- Dimensions: 209 cm (82 in)
- Location: San Pietro in Vincoli, Rome
- Preceded by: Rachel (sculpture)
- Followed by: Apollo

Leah is a sculpture by Michelangelo of the Old Testament figure Leah. Like the artist's Rachel, it was part of the final, 1542–1545 design for the tomb of Pope Julius II in San Pietro in Vincoli, on which it still remains.

== History ==
With Michelangelo's Rachel, the statue of Leah completed the decoration of the last version of the funeral monument of Pope Julius II in 1542–1545, a troubled work to which the artist dedicated almost 40 years.

Intended for the right niche, next to the older and successful Moses statue, the work is documented in a plea to Pope Paul III of July 20, 1542, which reported that the works were progressing well. A month after, Michelangelo contracted Raffaello da Montelupo to bring the five remaining statues of the tomb to completion, including Leah and Rachel. He reserved for these last two, however, a new execution by his own hand. It seems that the cleaning and finishing was left to his assistant.

After the completion of the monument, Michelangelo was much criticized for the final result, so that his autograph on the two niche statues was denied. That hypothesis was taken up for a long time in the 19th century, until documents were found to authenticate his authorship.

== Description and style ==
Leah, the Biblical heroine, is represented as a Roman matron, in classical dress and holding a mirror (which would recall the virtue of Prudence) or a diadem, through which runs her long braid of hair. According to Giorgio Vasari and Ascanio Condivi, Leah is an allegory for an "active life," based on a passage from Dante or Diputatione Camaldulenses by Cristoforo Landino.

In that sense, the two feminine figures might represent two ways of being, but the two ways of salvation are not necessarily in conflict with each other. The contemplative life represented by Rachel prays for its salvation through Faith, while the active life represented by Leah finds its salvation in work.

The communal interpretation of the artwork is that it is a kind of mediation between Reform and Catholicism owing to its association with Vittoria Colonna and her followers.

== See also ==
- List of works by Michelangelo

== Bibliography ==
- (in Italian) Umberto Baldini, Michelangelo scultore, Rizzoli, Milano 1973.
- (in Italian) Marta Alvarez Gonzáles, Michelangelo, Mondadori Arte, Milano 2007. ISBN 978-88-370-6434-1
