= Prophet Daniel (Michelangelo) =

Fresco on the Sistine Chapel ceiling

The Prophet Daniel
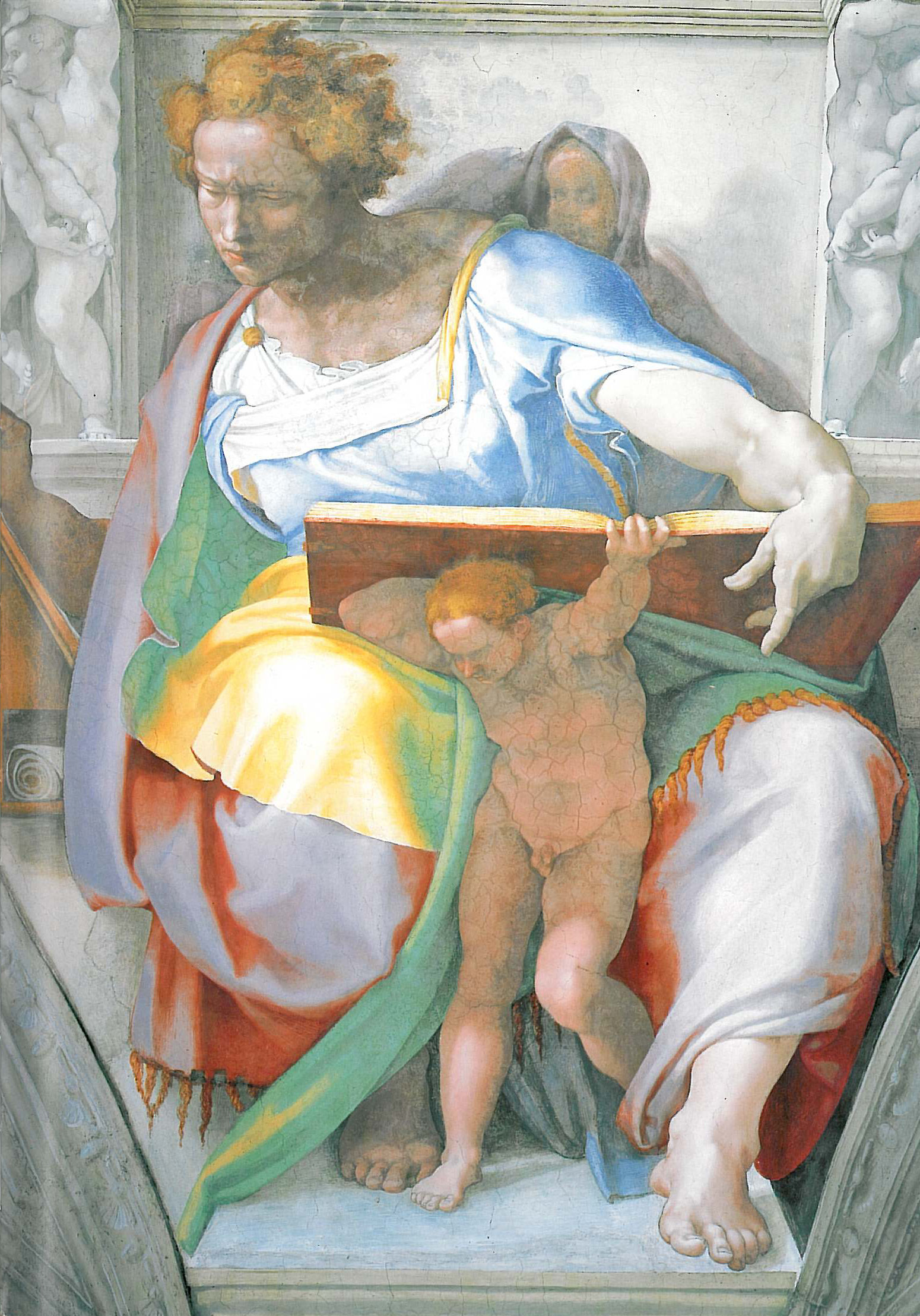
- Artist: Michelangelo
- Year: circa 1508–1512
- Type: Fresco
- Dimensions: 390 cm × 380 cm ( ×)
- Location: Sistine Chapel, Vatican Palace; Vatican City

The Prophet Daniel is one of the seven Old Testament prophets painted by the Italian High Renaissance master Michelangelo (c. 1542–1545) on the Sistine Chapel ceiling. The Sistine Chapel is in Vatican Palace, in the Vatican City.

This particular fresco figure is painted second on the right from the side of the High Altar. Unlike many other paintings of the period, this portrayal makes no reference to the most famous event from Daniel's life, that is his time in the den of the lions. Instead, Michelangelo shows Daniel reading a great book, which is held up by a muscular figure from below.

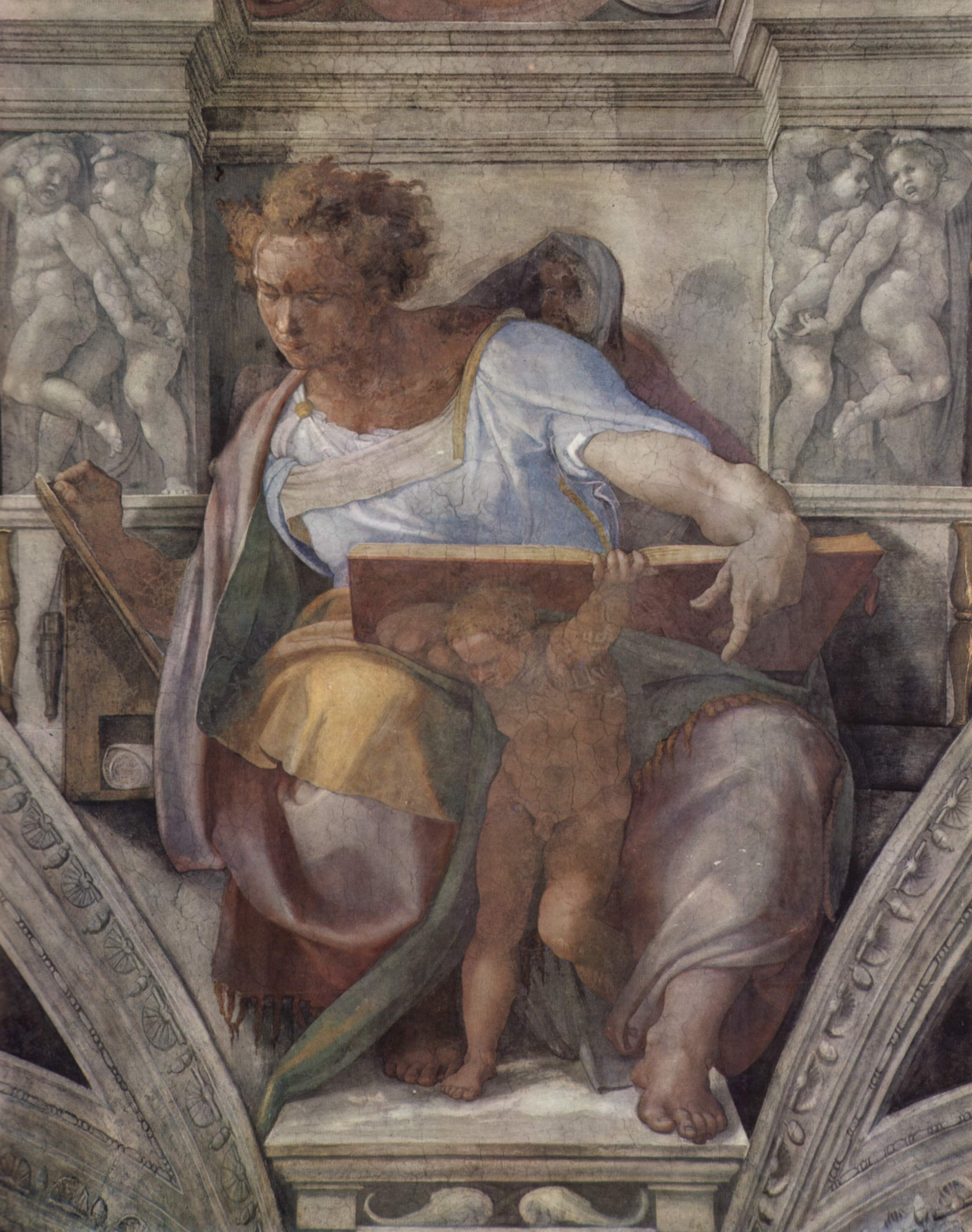
Daniel before restoration

== See also ==
- List of works by Michelangelo
- Sistine Chapel ceiling
