= Piccolomini Altarpiece =

Sculpture by Michelangelo

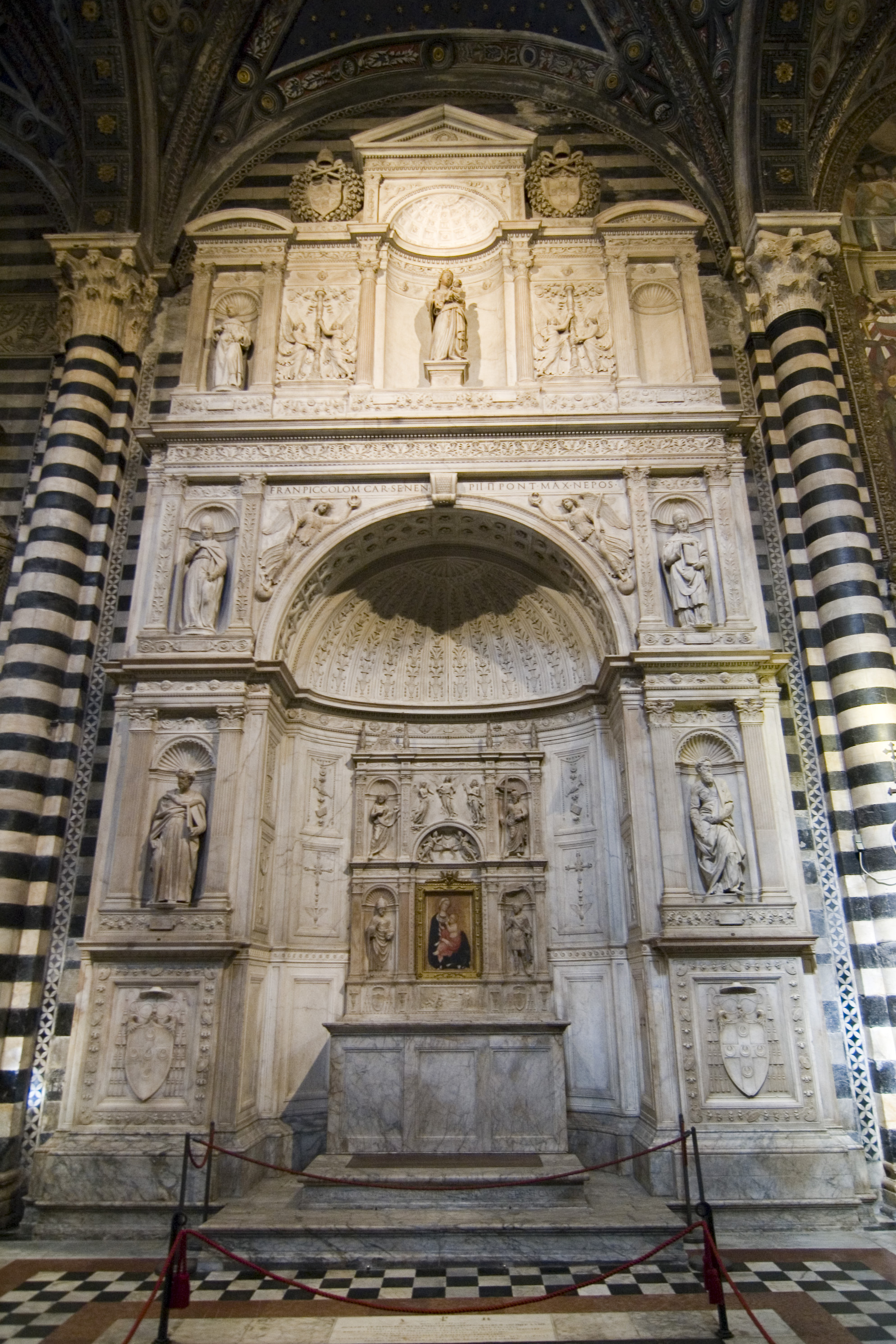
Piccolomini Altarpiece

The Piccolomini Altarpiece is an architectural and sculptural altarpiece in the left-nave of Siena Cathedral, commissioned by cardinal Francesco Todeschini Piccolomini who expected it to become his tomb. However, he was elected Pope Pius III and buried in the Vatican. It was built between 1481 and 1485 by Andrea Bregno in Carrara marble, with additions in the following decades – these included four niche sculptures produced between 1501 and 1504 by Michelangelo of saints Peter, Augustine (later resculpted as Saint Pius), Paul and Gregory. On top of the altar is the Madonna and Child, a sculpture (probably) by Jacopo della Quercia. The central painting of the Madonna is by Paolo di Giovanni Fei and from the late 14th century.

== History ==
The cardinal Francesco Todeschini Piccolomini, who became Pope Pius III, intended to construct a monumental altar to dedicate artworks to his uncle Pope Pius II, to celebrate the political and cultural power of his family, the Piccolomini, in Siena, and to establish a site for his own tomb. (In reality, Todeschini was buried in the Vatican after his election as Pope.) In the site chosen by Todeschini there had once been an altar for shoemakers, depicting the Nativity. The shoemakers agreed to give the location to the cardinal, provided they received another place within the duomo. Lack of available space, however, meant that the shoemakers still had to share the space with Todeschini.

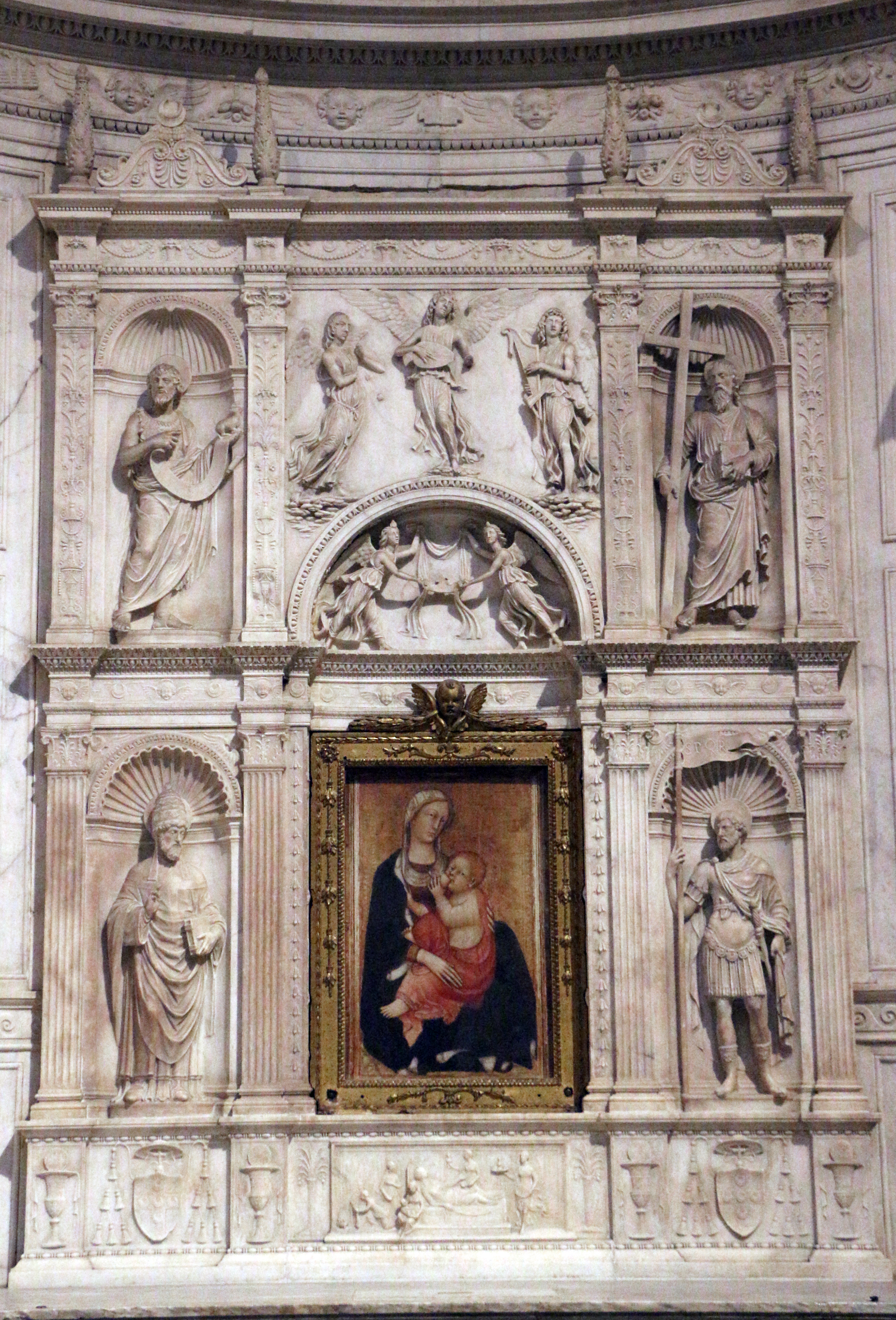
Centerpiece of the altar

Todeschini commissioned Andrea Bregno to construct the altar. Bregno worked from 1481 to 1485, as evidenced by the inscription "OPUS ANDREAE MEDIOLANENSIS MCCCCLXXXV" under the central niche where the altar's Madonna and Child are now located. Bregno, however, did not realize the marble altarpiece that was meant to frame the c. 1390 Madonna of Humility painting by Paolo di Giovanni Fei and the 14 statues "in the round" that were meant to fill the various niches and spaces of the altar. The original project included these elements but by 1486, Bregno, now in his 70s, had a breakdown in his physical help. He therefore returned to Rome, leaving the altar incomplete. From then on, only assistants from his workshop labored on the central marble altarpiece, that would enclose the Madonna of Humility.

Given Bregno's departure, Todeschini began to look for sculptors that would be able to make the remaining 14 statues. In the end, he entrusted the work to Florentine Pietro Torrigiano. But he made only the Saint Francis in the altar's upper left niche. The agreement between Todeschini and Torrigiano was broken for unknown reasons, which forced the Todeschini to find another artist.

On June 19, 1501, with the intercession of the banker Jacopo Galli, a contract was created with the young Michelangelo Buonarroti. Michelangelo had already completed his Vatican Pietà to great acclaim. As soon as he began to work on the altarpiece, he began to receive other ambitious commission offers, first among them to sculpt the gigantic Florentine David. These offers made the Sienese altarpiece seem too small a work for the young artist. Michelangelo began the commission slowly and only worked on it occasionally.

In 1503, Todeschini was elected pope but died after only 26 days. His heirs convinced Michelangelo, in a new contract dated to October 11, 1504, to complete the statues and the altar enriched by four statues that are found in the lower niches on the sides, realized with the help of assistants. Despite the repeated requests of the Piccolomini family, they did not complete the other envisioned statues. As a result, the archbishop of Siena Francesco Bandini Piccolomini annulled the contract in the 1530s. From then on, the Piccolomini lost interest in the altar, which has remained incomplete ever since.

At the end of the 18th century, the statue of Madonna and Child was placed in the altar's central niche. That statue was believed, until recently, to be the work of the young Jacopo della Quercia, but critics now attribute it to Giovanni di Cecco. The statue came from the altar of Saint Thomas Aquinas and, before that, the altar of San Jacobo Interciso—both altars in the Siena Duomo. The altarpiece was restored in 2008.

== Description ==
The architectural structure of the altar was inspired by the altarpiece made by Bregno in Rome's Santa Maria del Popolo, with a large niche containing the true altar and surrounded by a triumphal arch. The decoration in bas-relief contains motifs like festoons, garlands, cornucopias, vases, palms, candelabras, winged heads, dolphins, and tridents, among others. The decorations also include numerous half moons, which refer to the coat of arms of the Piccolomini. The decorations higher up were executed with less care than those on the lower levels.

To the sides, above the clients' coat of arms, there is a double register composed of niches framed by lesene, which contain the statues. Two similar niches are in the cornice of the altar, and a larger, central tympanum niche contains the statue of Madonna and Child by Giovanni di Cecco. The Madonna and Child predates the altar by over a hundred years.

Originally, there would have been 14 statues representing all the saints dear to the clients, the Piccolomini family and the city of Siena. Six in the side niches, three in the central niche where the Madonna and Child is now, two on the side pedestals above the cornice, and three on the three pedestals above the tympanum. These were never completed, however.

The remaining statues are, below and on the left side:

- Saint Peter by Michelangelo
- Saint Augustine by Michelango (later modified to represent Saint Pius
- Saint Francis by Pietro Torrigiani, possibly modified by Michelangelo

At right and on the lower level, there are:

- Saint Paul by Michelangelo
- Saint Gregory by Michelangelo

The central altarpiece painting of the Virgin Mary was a c. 1390 painting of Paolo di Giovanni Fei. Its marble altar frame has received less critical attention because it is believed to have just been the work of Andrea Bregno's workshop.

== See also ==
- List of works by Michelangelo

== Bibliography ==
- (in Italian) Umberto Baldini, Michelangelo scultore, Rizzoli, Milano, 1973.
- (in Italian) Toscana. Guida d'Italia (Guida rossa), Touring Club Italiano, Milano, 2003.
- "Scrubbed up Michelangelo sculptures draw Siena visitors". Italy Magazine. 18 May 2009.
- "The Statues of Michelangelo". The Italian Tribune. 31 May 2018.
- Istraëls, Machtelt (2010). "Sassetta and the Guglielmi Piccolomini altarpiece in Siena". The Burlington Magazine. 152 (1284): 162–171. ISSN 0007-6287. JSTOR 40601389.
