= Epifania =

Cartoon by Michelangelo

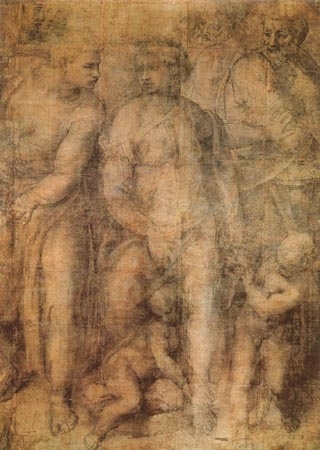
- Artist: Michelangelo
- Year: c. 1550–1553
- Type: black chalk on paper
- Dimensions: 232 cm × 165 cm (91 in × 65 in)
- Location: British Museum; London

Epifania (English: Epiphany) is a cartoon or full-scale drawing in black chalk by Michelangelo, produced in Rome around 1550–1553. It is 2.32 metres (7 ft 7 in) tall by 1.65 m (5 ft 5 in) wide, and is made up of 26 sheets of paper. The cartoon forms part of the collection of the British Museum in London.

== Subject matter ==
The composition shows the Virgin Mary, with the Christ child sitting between her legs. An adult male figure to the right, probably Saint Joseph, is pushed away by Mary. In front of him is the infant John the Baptist. The adult figure standing to Mary's left is unidentified, as are other figures only just visible in the background. Michelangelo repeatedly changed the composition and its forms, as is apparent in the cartoon's alterations. The composition was originally thought to be of the Three Kings, which may be the reason for the title, but is now understood as referring to Christ's siblings mentioned in the Gospels (explained by Saint Epiphanias—another possible source for the title—as Joseph's sons by a previous marriage, and hence Mary's stepsons, leaving their marriage unconsummated—hence her pushing Joseph away—and Mary forever a virgin).

== History ==
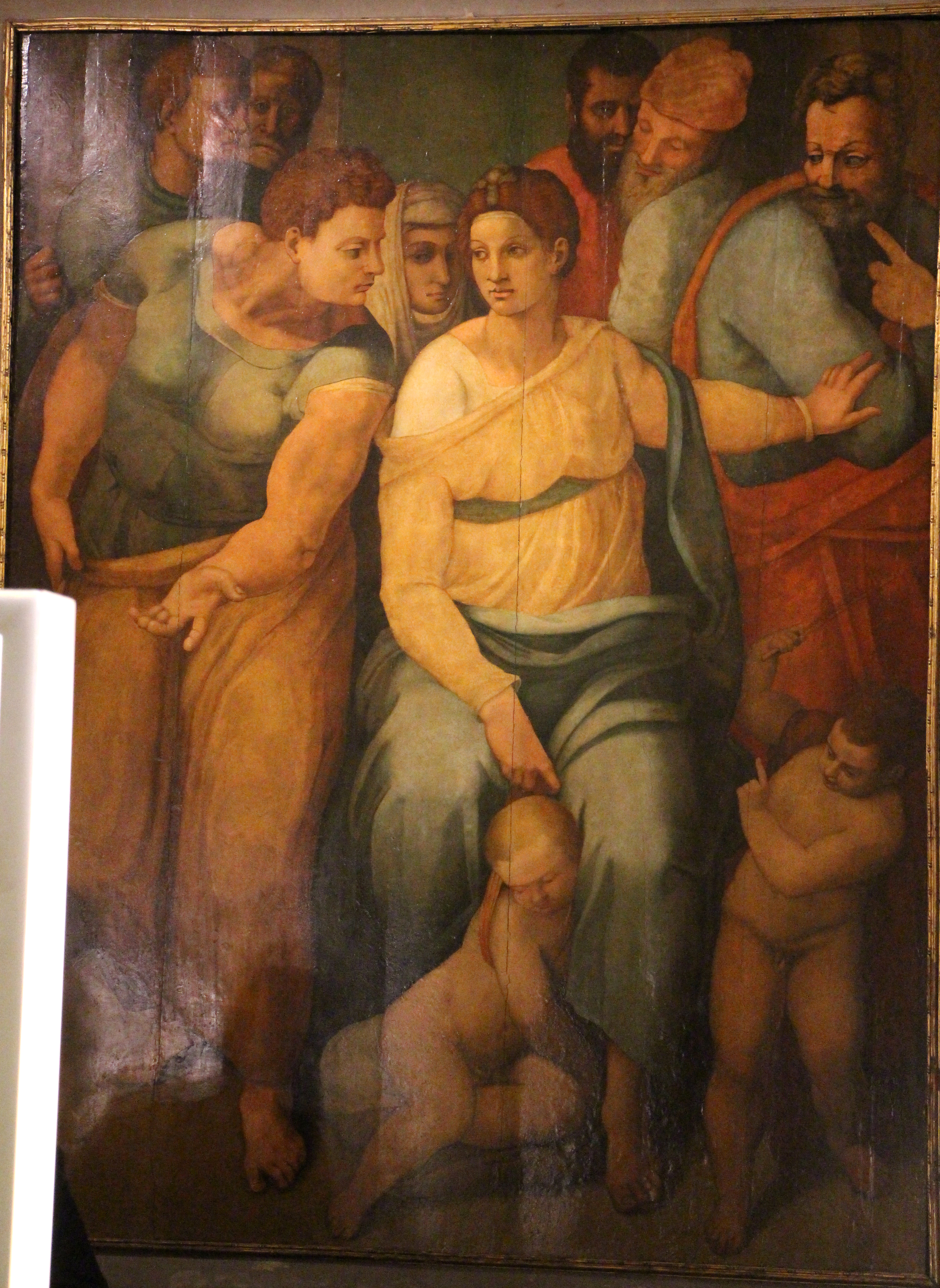
Epifania by Ascanio Condivi, Casa Buonarroti, Florence

Michelangelo's biographer Ascanio Condivi used this cartoon for an unfinished painting. A 19th-century Scottish collector, John Malcolm of Poltalloch, bought the cartoon for only £11 0s 6d. and, on John's death in 1893, his son John Wingfield Malcolm gave it to the British Museum. Parliament voted £25,000 to purchase the rest of his collection for the museum two years later (equivalent to £2,842,103 in 2025). The cartoon is on display in Gallery 90 of the Museum.

== See also ==
- List of works by Michelangelo
- Michelangelo
