= Crouching Boy =

Sculpture by Michelangelo

- Italian: Ragazzo accovacciato
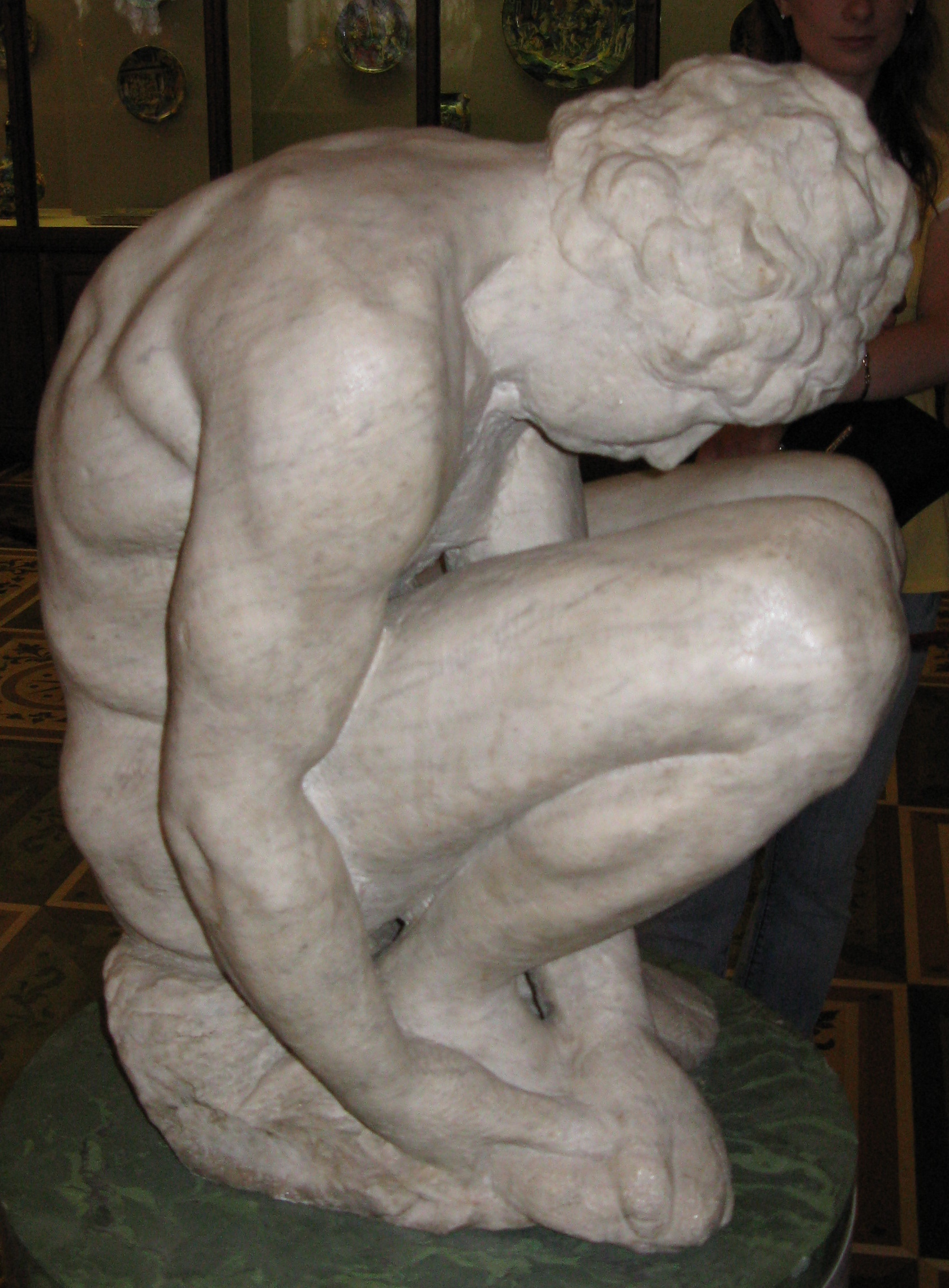
- Artist: Michelangelo
- Year: c. 1530 - 1534
- Type: Marble
- Dimensions: 54 cm (21 in)
- Location: Hermitage Museum, Saint Petersburg
- Preceded by: Apollo (Michelangelo)
- Followed by: Risen Christ (Michelangelo, Santa Maria sopra Minerva)

Crouching Boy is a sculpture of the Renaissance Italian painter and sculptor Michelangelo, preserved today at the Hermitage Museum in Saint Petersburg. It is the only work by Michelangelo in the Hermitage. Sculpted between 1530 and 1533, it was originally intended for the tomb of the Medici family in Florence. Consistent with Michelangelo's use of the human figure in his memorials, scholars have speculated that the crouched boy might have served as an allegory of mourning or eternal youth.

== Description ==
The Crouching Boy is a 54 cm marble sculpture and shows a boy, naked and turned in on himself, perhaps pulling a thorn from his foot. Even though the statue is not well finished, facial features, hair and body shapes are easily recognizable.

== See also ==
- List of works by Michelangelo
- Non finito
