= Apollo (Michelangelo) =

Sculpture by Michelangelo

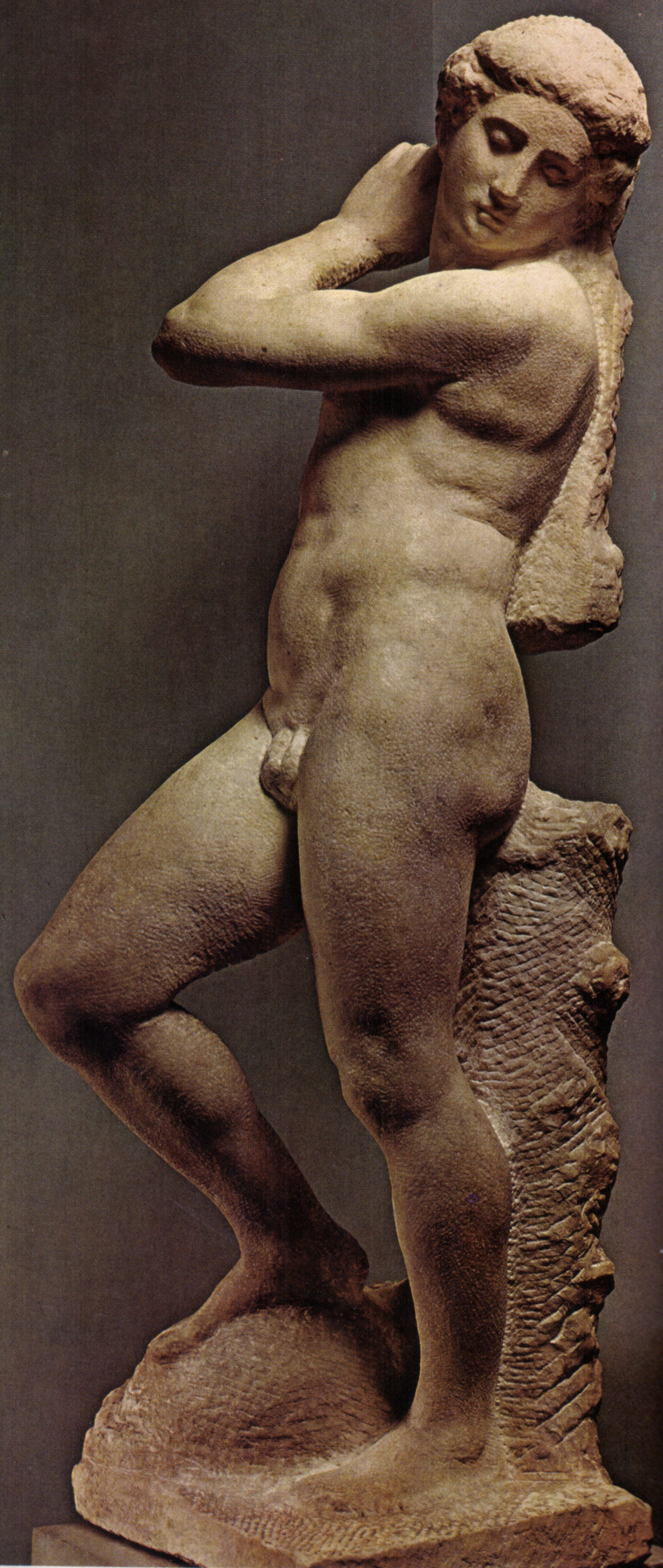
- An unfinished statue ascribed to Michelangelo - National Museum of the Bargello
- Artist: Michelangelo
- Year: c. 1530
- Type: sculpture
- Medium: Marble
- Dimensions: 146 cm (57 in)
- Location: Bargello; Florence
- Preceded by: Leah (sculpture)
- Followed by: Crouching Boy

Apollo, also known as Apollo-David, David-Apollo, or Apollino, is a 1.46 m unfinished marble sculpture by Michelangelo that dates from approximately 1530. It now stands in the Bargello museum in Florence.

== History ==
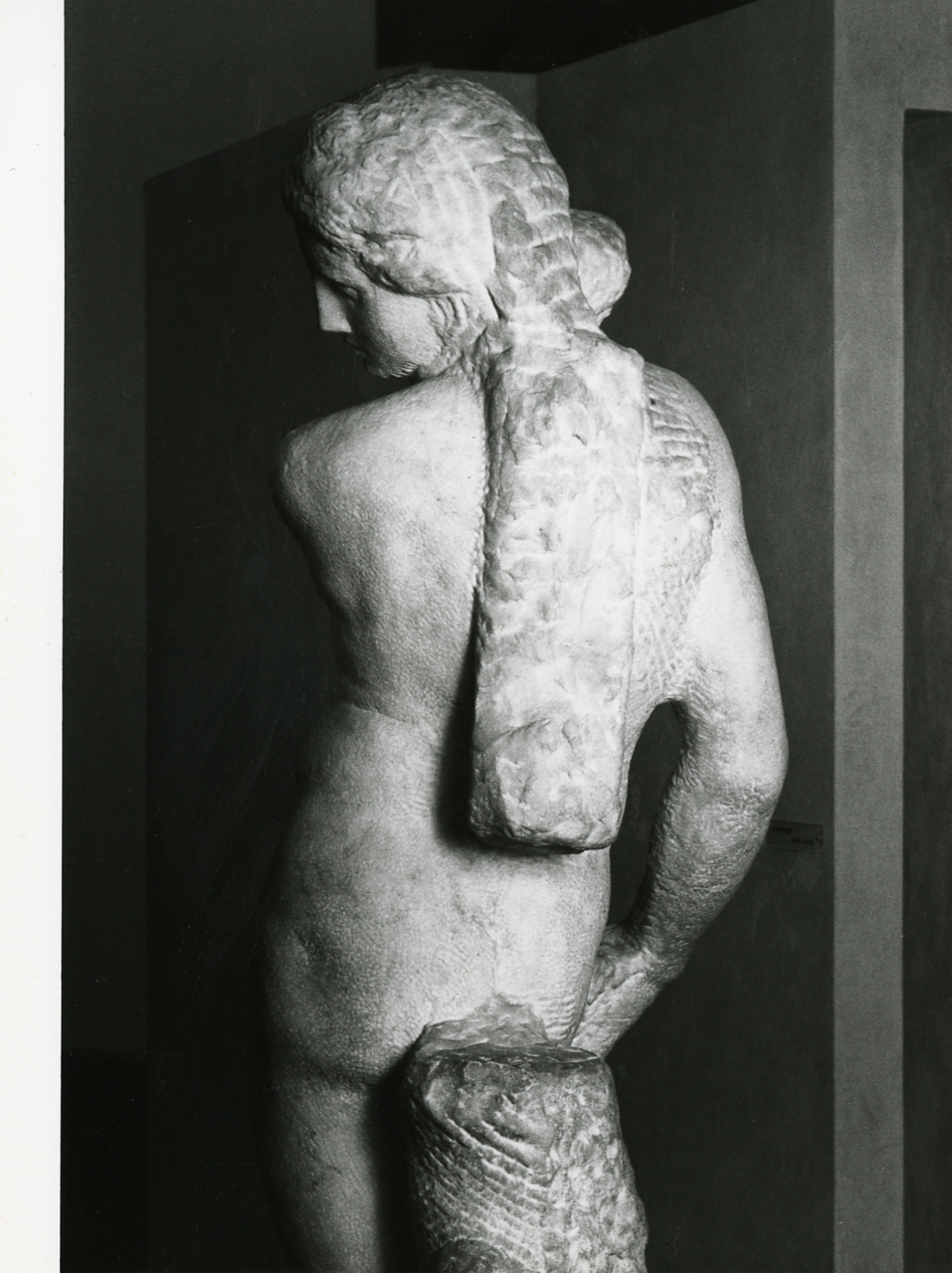
Rear view. Photo by Paolo Monti, 1981)

The statue had been commissioned for the private palace of Baccio Valori when the fierce governor was imposed on Florence by Clement VII after recovery of the city from a protracted siege. Work on the sculpture stopped shortly after Alessandro de' Medici was made duke and Michelangelo left the city. The sculpture then entered the collection of Duke Cosimo I. It was placed in his private quarters along with a "Bacchus" of Baccio Bandinelli, a work of Andrea Sansovino, and an old "Ganymede" that had been restored by Benvenuto Cellini.

Hallmarks of his style and methods exist on the unfinished work that support the attribution of the statue to Michelangelo. The subject of the unfinished statue was never noted by Michelangelo, however, and contemporary historical sources disagree about the subject. According to Vasari it is an "Apollo", perhaps in the act of taking an arrow from a quiver. In the inventory of Cosimo I of 1553, however, it is identified as, "David", by whoever drew up the historic catalogue. Art critics therefore identify the sculpture as one or the other, or, by showing a hyphenated title, "Apollo-David" or "David-Apollo", to note the uncertainty. Factors favoring the identity as Apollo are: the body is stocky and mature, as Apollo often was portrayed, rather than the typical portrayal of a youthful David; no bow is represented in the carving and, no unfinished portion of the statue allows enough area for one.

Conjecture exists that the sculptor had started the work as David, perhaps toward 1525, and later finished it as Apollo. There also are those who have attempted to identify the work as the lost Apollo Cupid (Valentinier, 1958), carved in 1537 by Jacopo Galli in Rome.

When Cosimo came into possession of the collection containing the most important statues of Michelangelo (the Bacchus or the Genius of Victory), the Apollo-David was placed in the Boboli Gardens, where it decorated a long niche of its amphitheater. In 1824 the statue was transported to the Uffizi, and later placed into the collection at the Bargello. Now it is in the National Gallery of Art Museum, part of the Renaissance wing complete with European paintings and sculptures.

== Description related to style and subject ==
The work depicts a naked man and, apart from the enigmatic subject, the sculpture is made particularly complex via the use of versus twist, which shows the body's contours in depth, multiplying the points of view. Arms and legs are set to play an effective correlation with some joints bent and the opposite being flat. For example, the left arm is bent and stretched the right, and the right leg is extended and the left is bent over an unfinished structure on the ground. Some declare that the structure was intended to become the head of Goliath. Behind the figure is a tree trunk, which essentially, is static and has a function of support for the whole statue. Another unfinished portion of the marble extends upward along its back from the waist.

The strong movement of the head to the left is contrasted by the extreme straightness of the right arm (not shown in the photograph displayed to the right). From another angle (displayed), the left arm isolates the upper body from the lower, generating a characteristically dynamic effect that is taught to art students as creating, mannerism.

If considered as a "David" rather than an "Apollo", the statue presents a striking difference from the more famous, athletic and youthful figure in the Piazza della Signoria by the same sculptor. Instead of displaying the potential force and inward wrath of the biblical hero, it reads as almost melancholy or remorseful for his bloody action against Goliath if that be his head, perhaps revealing all consequences of the action.

Another interpretation is that the pose could express a veiled, but deep animosity by the sculptor against the conquerors of Florence, although work on the statue stopped with the change.

== See also ==
- List of works by Michelangelo

== Bibliography ==
- Umberto Baldini, Michelangelo scultore, Rizzoli, Milano, 1973.
- Marta Alvarez Gonzáles, Michelangelo, Mondadori Arte, Milano, 2007. ISBN 978-88-370-6434-1
- Lutz Heusinger, Michelangelo, in I protagonisti dell'arte italiana, Scala Group, Firenze, 2001. ISBN 8881170914
