= Giovanni Pisano =

Italian sculptor

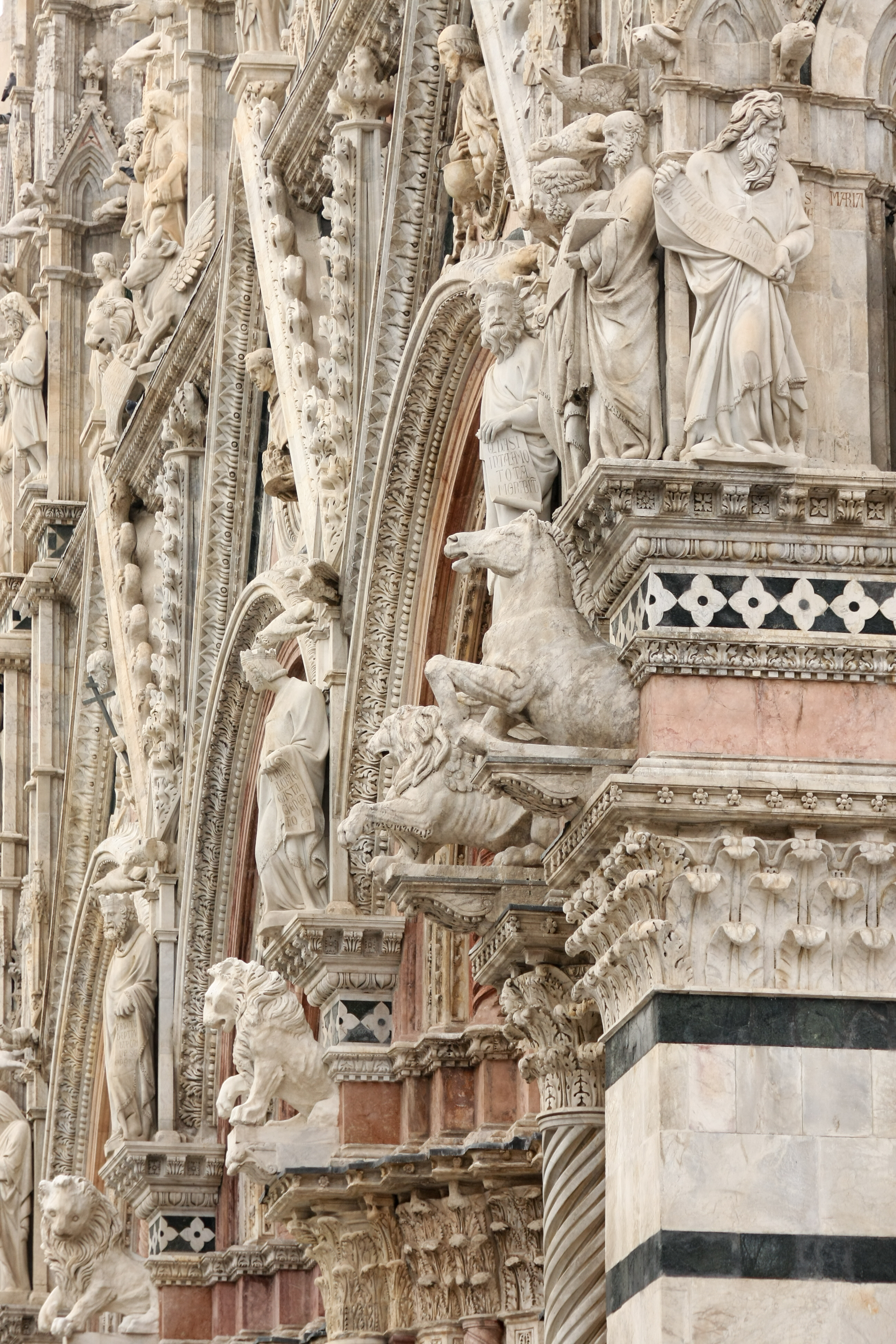
Giovanni Pisano began the facade of Siena Cathedral and provided its sculptures. (The sculptures are replicas.)

Giovanni Pisano (c. 1250 – c. 1315) was an Italian sculptor, who worked in the cities of Pisa, Siena and Pistoia. He is best known for his sculpture which combines French Gothic and the Ancient Roman art. Henry Moore, referring to his statues for the facade of Siena Cathedral, called him "the first modern sculptor".

== History ==
Born in Pisa, Giovanni Pisano was the son of the famous sculptor Nicola Pisano. He received his training in his father's workshop and in 1265–1268 he worked with him on the pulpit in Siena Cathedral. Their next major work was the Fontana Maggiore in Perugia, completed in 1278. Nicola Pisano is thought to have died either around 1278 or in 1284 when Giovanni took up residence in Siena. These first works were made in Nicola's style and it is difficult to separate the contributions of the two artists. However, the Madonna and Child^{Which?} can be attributed with certainty to Giovanni, because of its new way to express intimacy between mother and child.

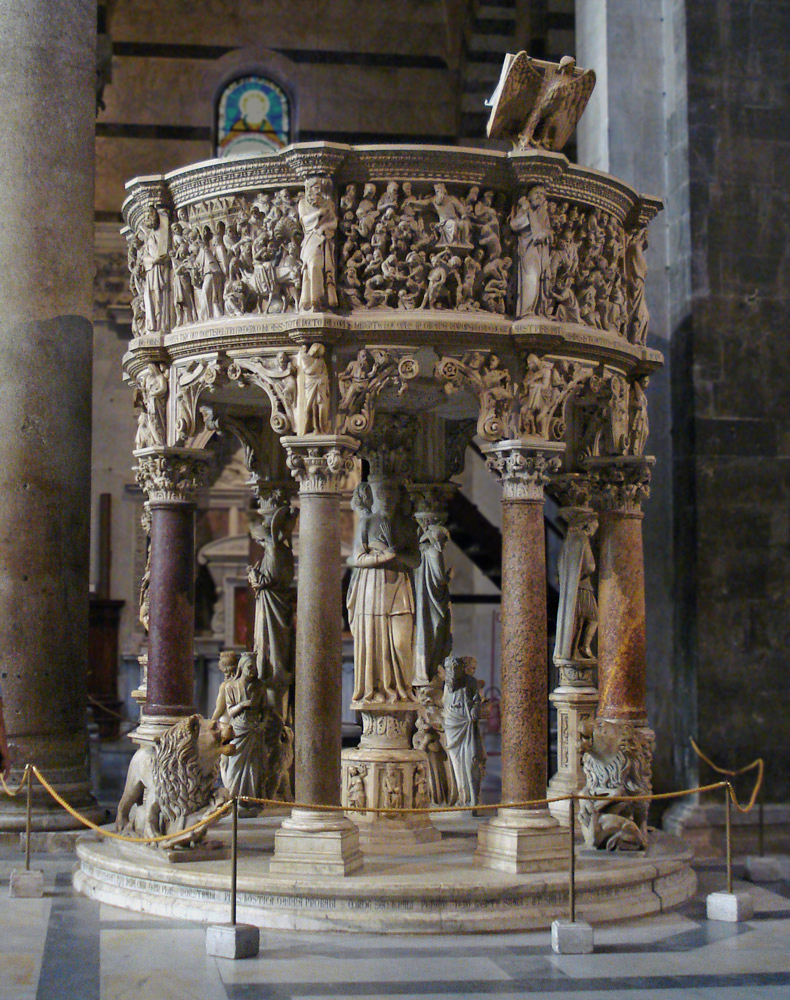
The pulpit of Pisa Cathedral

Giovanni's next work was at Baptistry, sculpting the statues in the two rows of traceried gables at the exterior (1277–1284). The vivacity of these statues is a new confirmation that he had left the serene style of his father behind. Between 1287 and 1296 he was appointed chief architect (capomaestro) of Siena Cathedral. The architectural design and elegant sculptures for the facade of the cathedral in Siena show his tendency to blend Gothic art with reminders of Roman art. The work was continued after his death, with still greater Gothic elaboration, by Memmo di Filippuccio.

In 1296 he returned to Pisa to become capomaestro of the Cathedral there. In 1301 he completed his work on the Pulpit of Sant' Andrea in Pistoia which he had already started in 1297. The pulpit has five reliefs: the Annunciation and Nativity; the Adoration, the Dream of the Magi and the Angel Warning Joseph; the Massacre of the Innocents; the Crucifixion; and the Last Judgement.

Giovanni's work between 1302 and 1310 at the new pulpit for the Cathedral of Pisa shows his distinct preference for animation in his characters and moved his father's style even further away. This pulpit with its dramatic scenes has become his masterwork. It shows nine scenes from the New Testament, carved in white marble with a chiaroscuro effect. It contains even a bold, naturalistic depiction of a naked Hercules. His figure Prudence in the pulpit may have been an inspiration for the Eve in the painting The Expulsion from the Garden of Eden by Masaccio. After the fire of 1595, it was packed away during the redecoration and was not rediscovered and re-erected until 1926.

The church of San Nicola in Pisa was enlarged between 1297 and 1313 by the Augustinians, perhaps by the design of Giovanni Pisano. He probably was also responsible for the façade of San Paolo a Ripa d'Arno. His last major work dates from around 1313 when he made a monument in memory of Margaret of Brabant (who died in 1311) at the request of her husband emperor Henry VII.

== Legacy ==
Among his pupils were Giovanni di Balduccio and Tino di Camaino, who both became prolific sculptors, and the architect and sculptor Agostino da Siena. He also had an influence on the painter Pietro Lorenzetti. Giorgio Vasari included a biography of Pisano in his book Le vite dei più eccellenti pittori, scultori, e architetti.

The asteroid 7313 Pisano was named to honour Nicola and Giovanni Pisano.

== Gallery ==
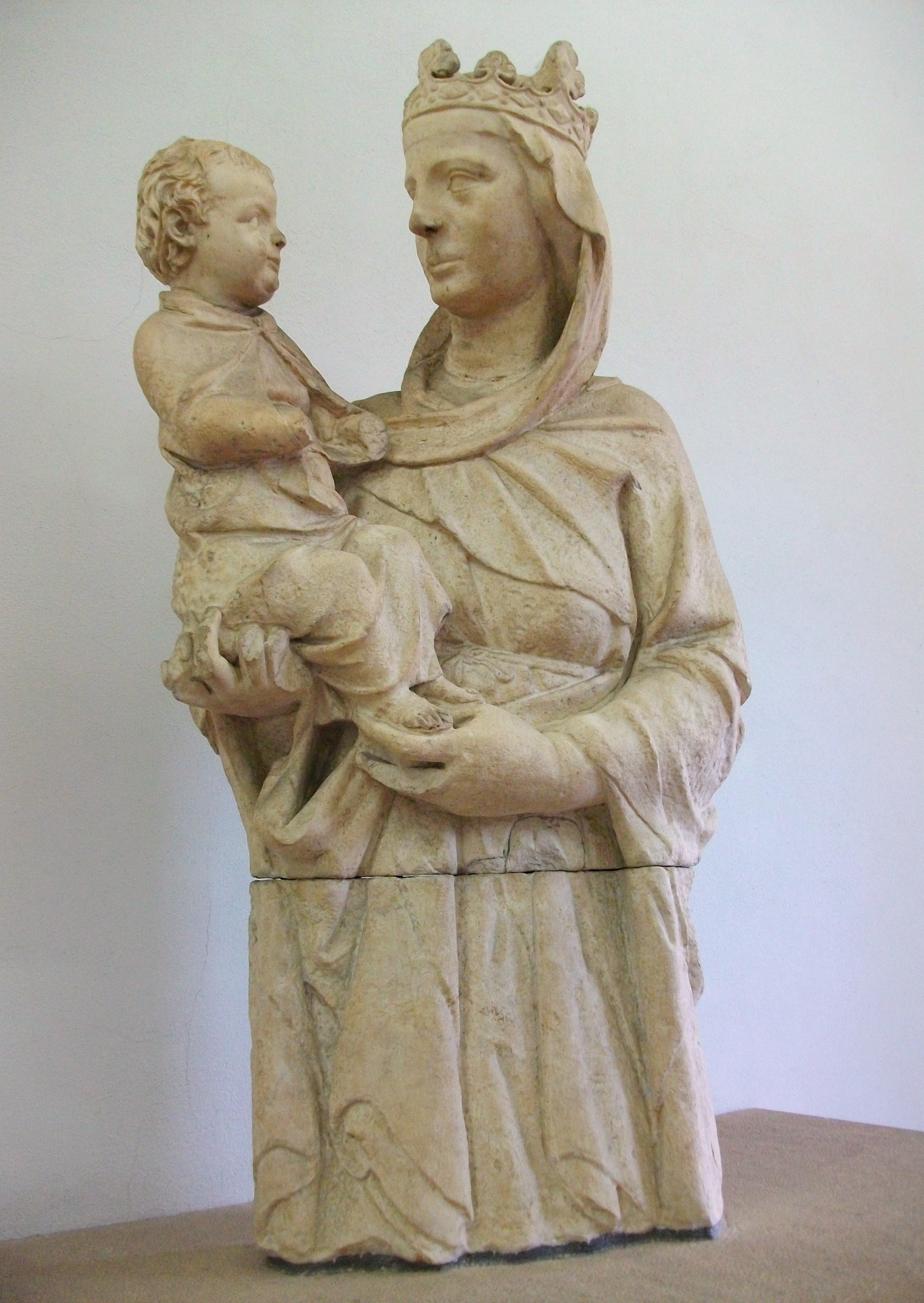
Madonna and Child from Pisa Cathedral (Museo dell'Opera del Duomo de Pisa)

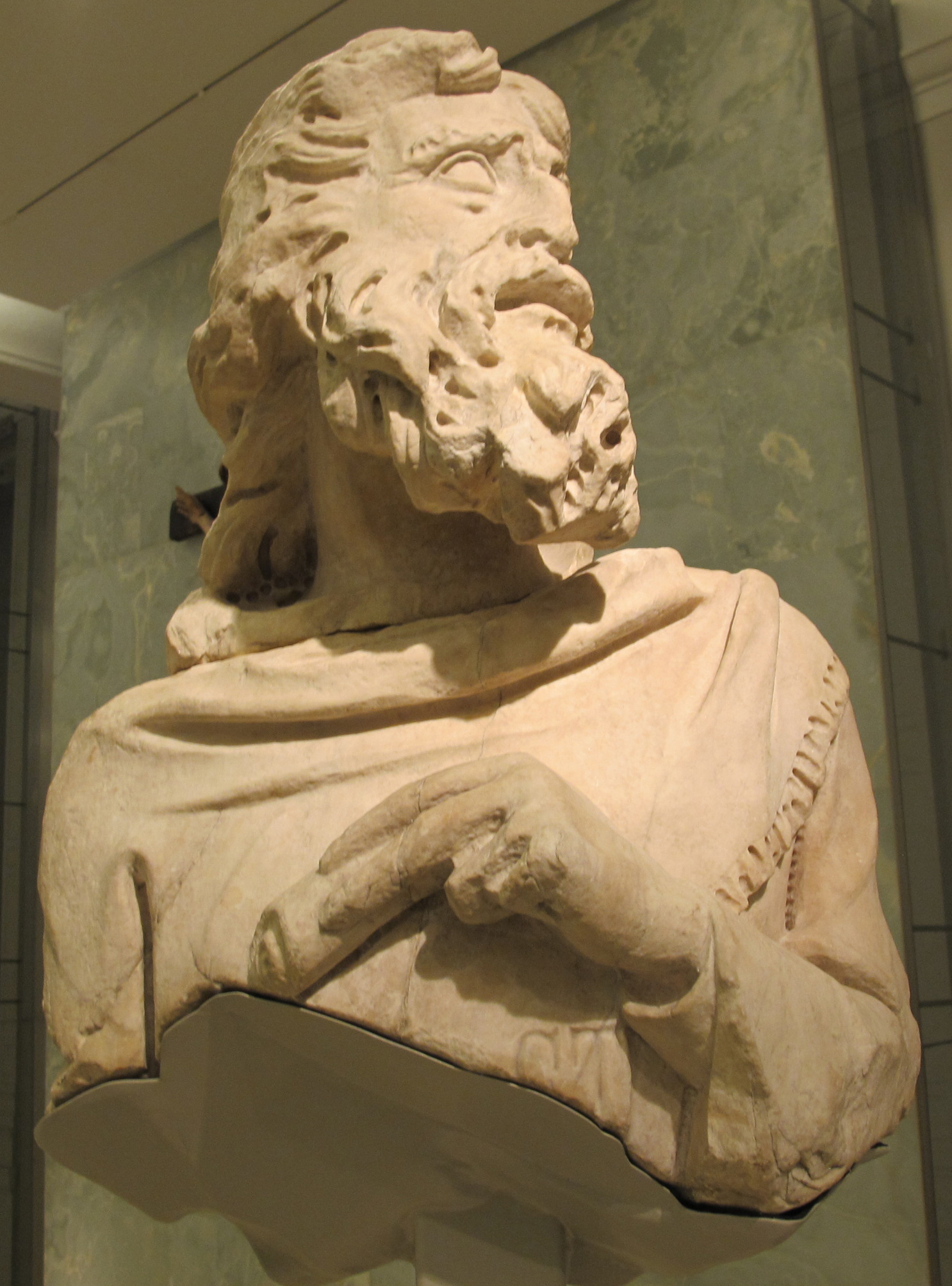
The Prophet Haggai from Siena Cathedral (V&A, London)

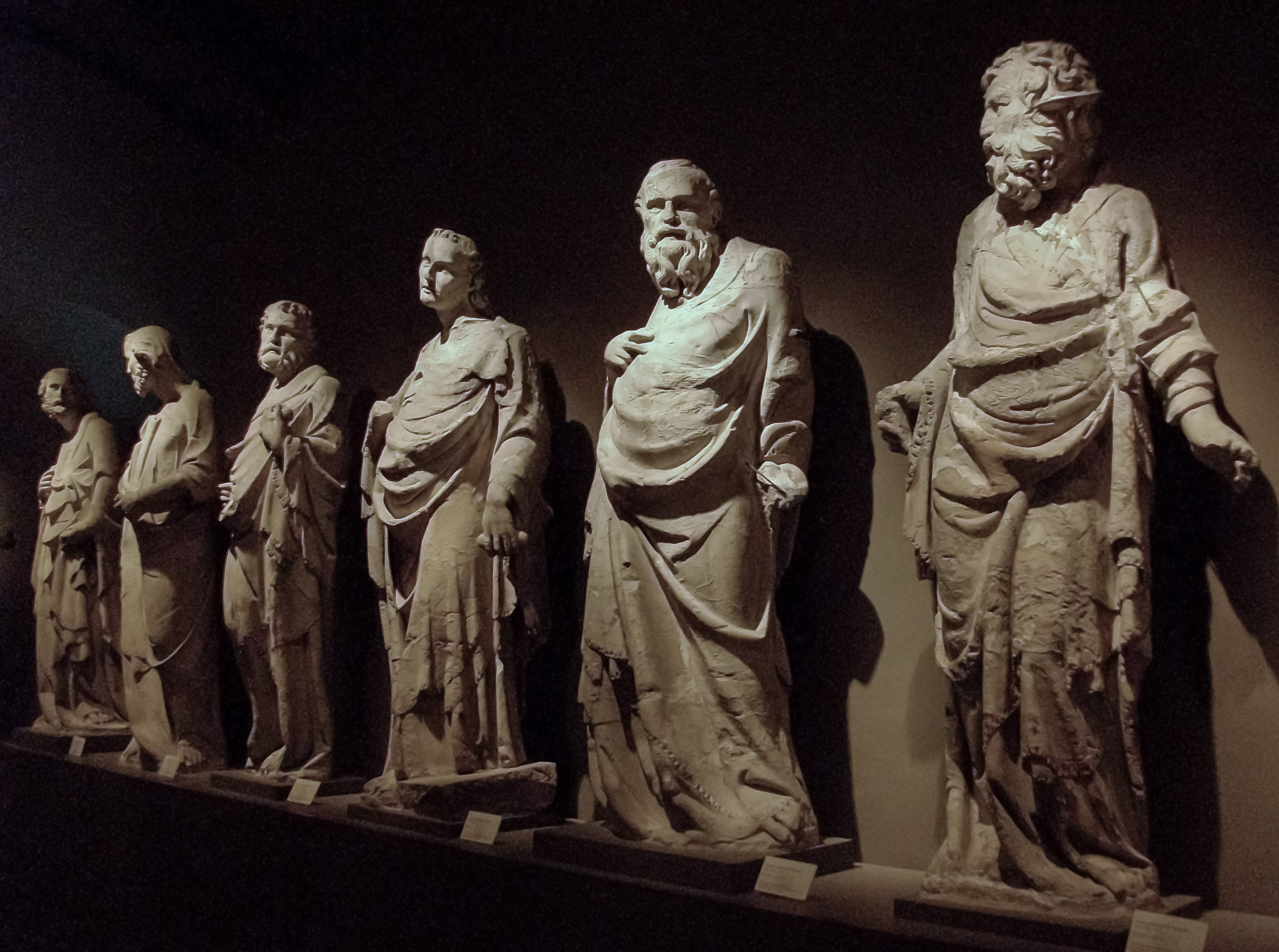
The statues of the facade of Siena Cathedral, (Museo dell'Opera del Duomo de Siena)

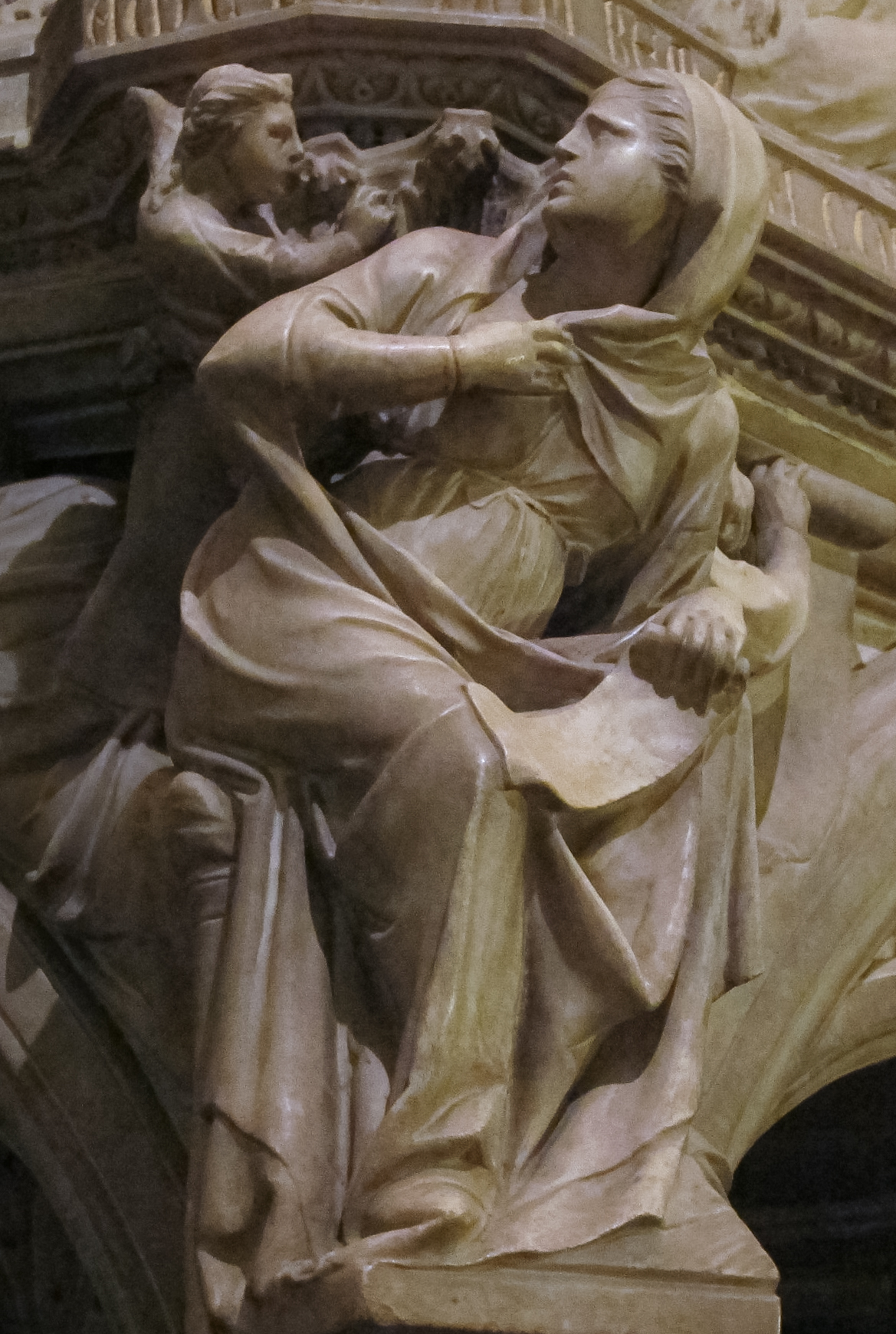
The Annunciation from the pulpit of Sant'Andrea, Pistoia

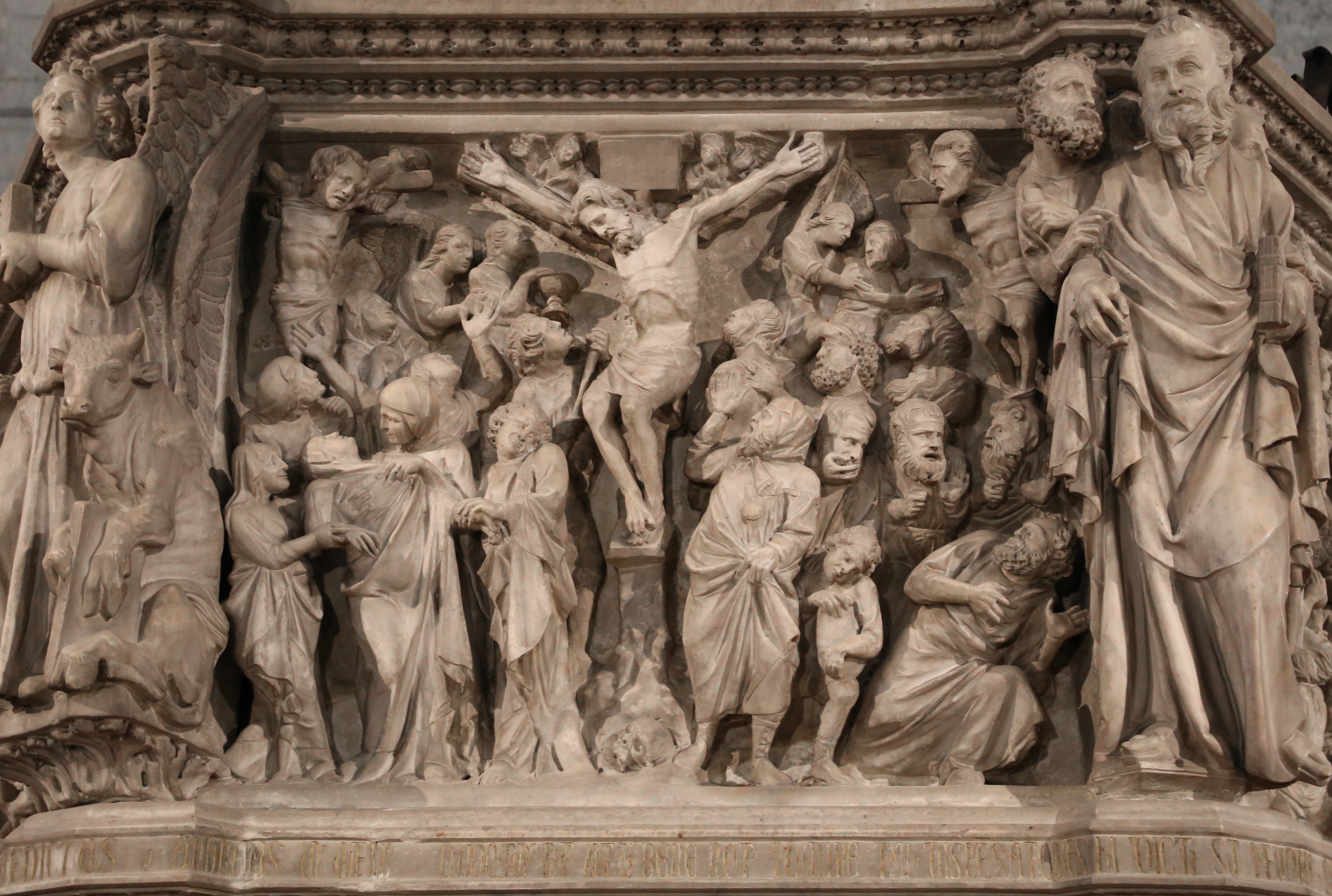
The Crucifixion from the pulpit of Sant' Andrea, Pistoia

== See also ==
- Giovanni di Cecco
- Duccio
- Arnolfo di Cambio

== Literature ==
- Giorgio Vasari. "Giovanni Pisano", in: Lives of the Most Excellent Painters, Sculptors, and Architects. 1568 edition. Translated by Adrienne DeAngelis on the basis of that by Gaston C. DeVere (1912/1915), and edited online in 2011.
- Carli, Enzo (1966). Giovanni Pisano (in Italian). Milan. ISBN 88-7781-045-9.
- Mellini, G. L. (1969). Il pulpito di Giovanni Pisano a Pistoia (in Italian). Florence.
- Hohenfeld, Kai (2014). Die Madonnenskulpturen des Giovanni Pisano. Stilkritik, Kulturtransfer und Materialimitation (in German). Kromsdorf. ISBN 978-3-89739-821-4.
- Clario Di Fabio, Gianluca Ameri, Francesca Girelli. "Giovanni Pisano" (The Dossier of the Month). Art e Dossier, 376, May 2020 (in Italian).
