= Importuno di Michelangelo =

Artwork attributed to Michelangelo

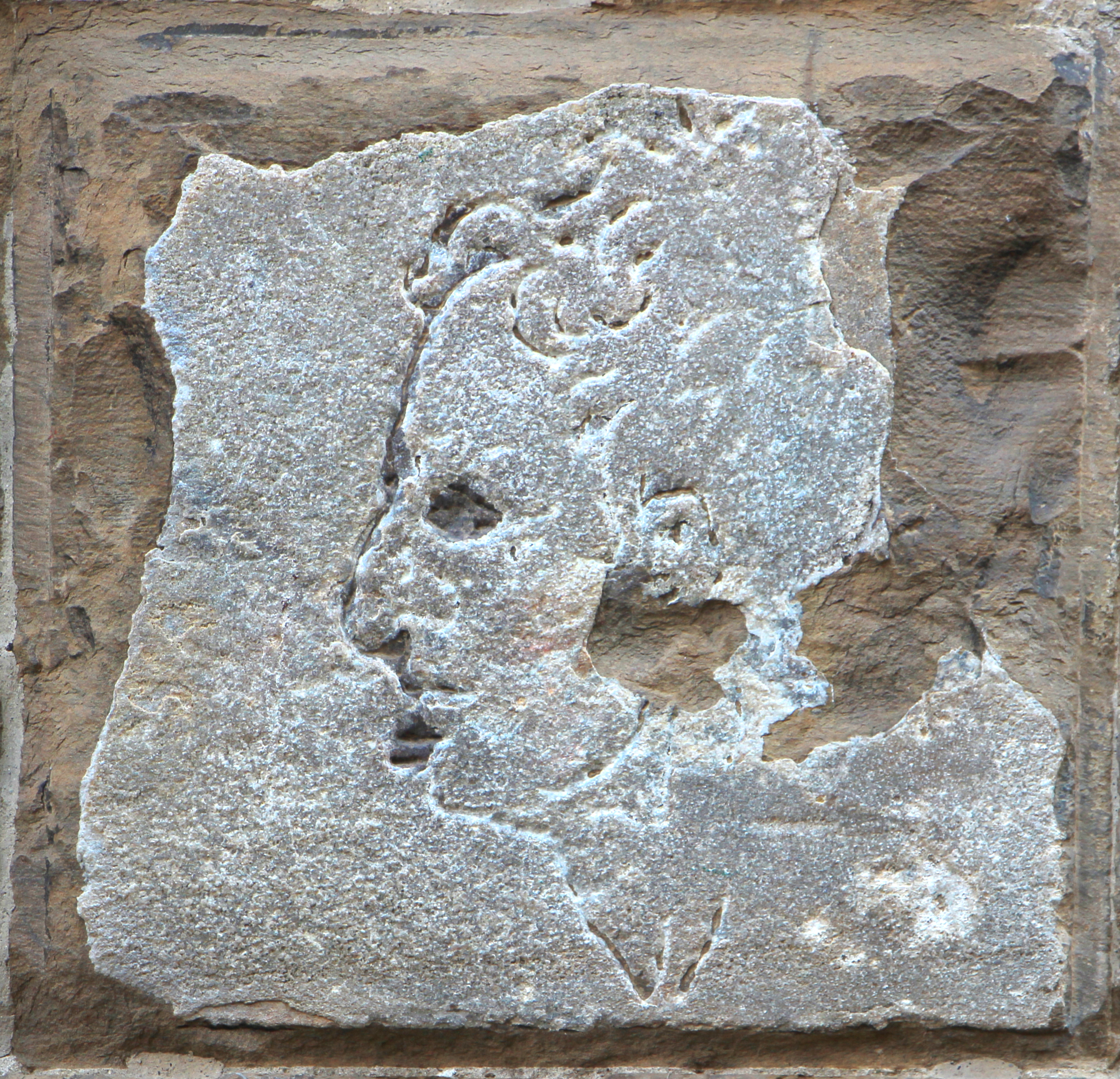
- Profile of a man
- Artist: Attributed to Michelangelo
- Location: Palazzo Vecchio; Florence

The Importuno di Michelangelo ("The Nuisance by Michelangelo") is the profile of a man's head carved on the façade of Palazzo Vecchio in Florence, recently attributed to the artist Michelangelo Buonarroti by Adriano Marinazzo. This new hypothesis has been published in the Italian art magazine Art e Dossier.

== History ==
The reason for this profile is unknown. An old popular legend links it to the artist Michelangelo. He allegedly sculpted it to ridicule someone he found bothersome (hence Importuno di Michelangelo, "The Nuisance by Michelangelo").

== The new hypothesis ==
The new hypothesis on Michelangelo's possible involvement in the creation of the profile of Palazzo Vecchio is based on the strong resemblance of the latter to a profile drawn by Michelangelo in the early 16th century now at the Louvre. The profile was probably sculpted with the permission of the city authorities. The façade of Palazzo Vecchio was constantly guarded. Therefore its author enjoyed a certain consideration and freedom of action.

The sculpted profile style is consistent with that of the head profiles drawn by Michelangelo in the early years of the 16th century. Consequently, the portrait of Palazzo Vecchio should also be dated to the beginning of the 16th century; its execution would coincide with the placement in 1504 of Michelangelo's David to the left of the Palazzo Vecchio's entrance.

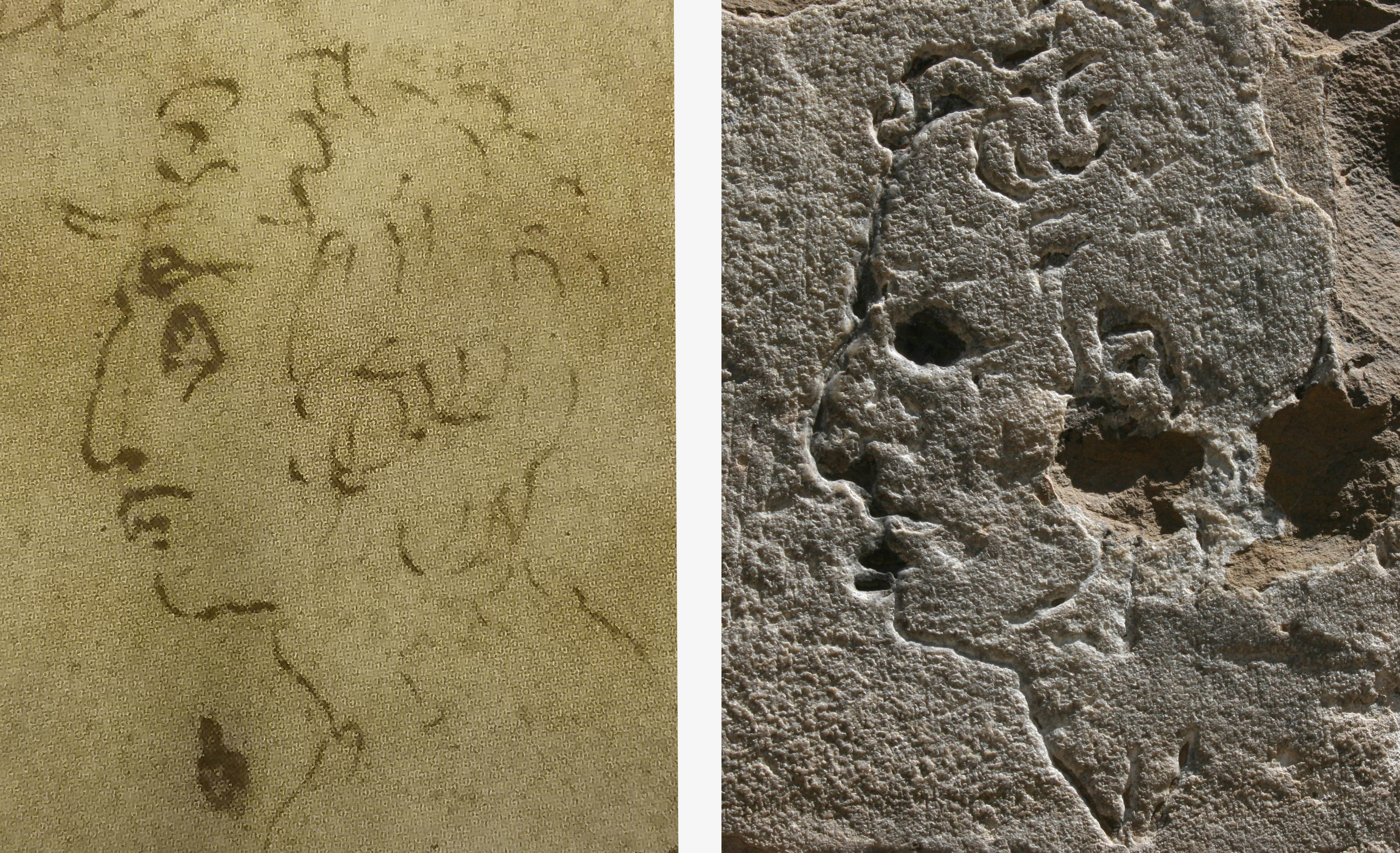
Comparison between the profile of the Louvre and the sculptural profile of Palazzo Vecchio. Comparison by Adriano Marinazzo.

== Reception ==
The new hypothesis received immediate attention from scholars and the international media. The Wall Street Journal reported this news on the front page "The attribution of a new Michelangelo would be significant, particularly one hiding in plain sight." Further articles were published by Le Figaro, The Telegraph, Die Presse, Smithsonian Magazine, Artnet News, and others.

== See also ==
- List of works by Michelangelo
