= Rachel (sculpture) =

Sculpture by Michelangelo

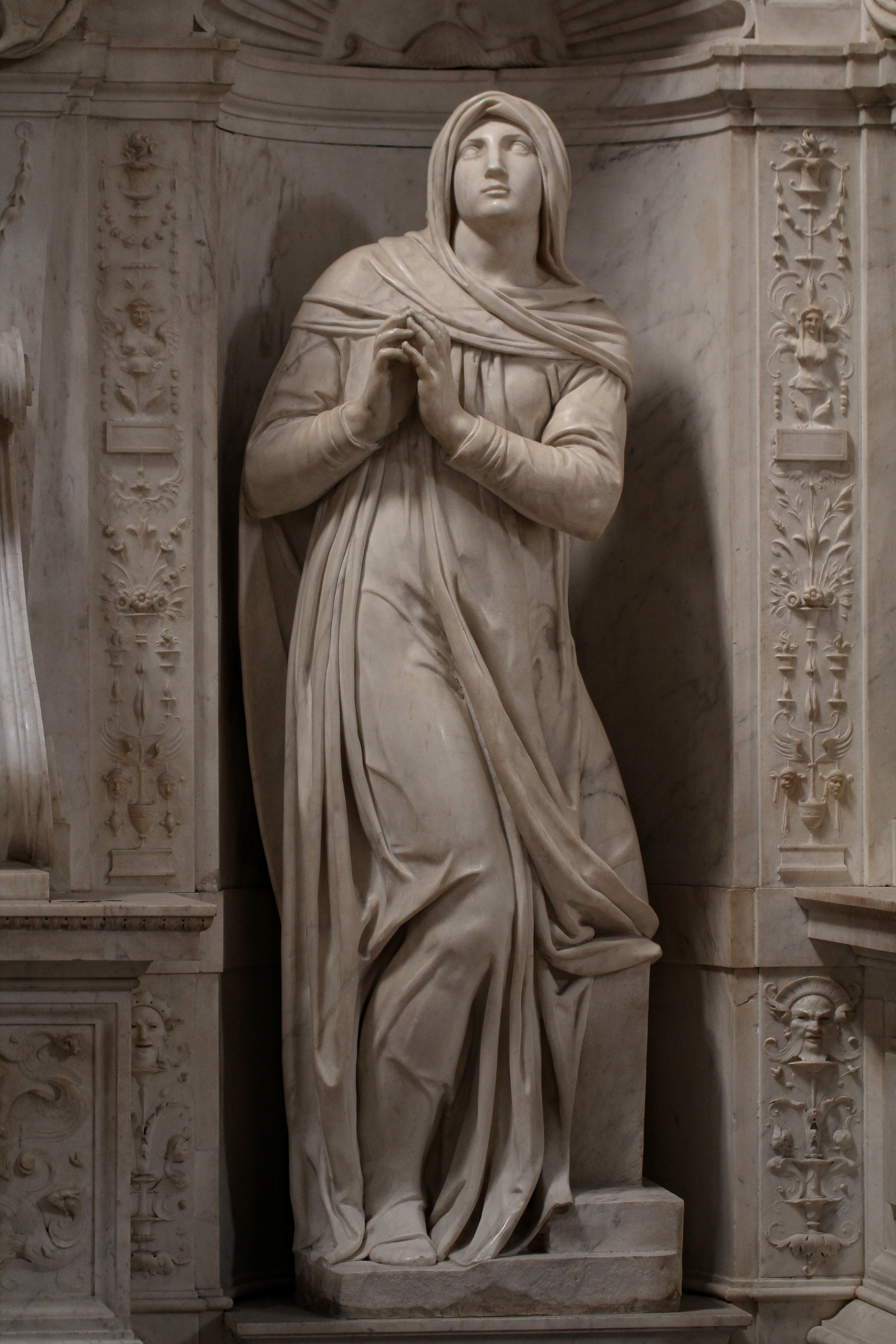
- Rachel
- Artist: Michelangelo
- Year: c. 1542-1545
- Type: sculpture
- Medium: Marble
- Location: San Pietro in Vincoli; Rome
- Preceded by: The Genius of Victory
- Followed by: Leah (sculpture)

Rachel is a sculpture by Michelangelo of the Old Testament figure Rachel. Like Leah, it was part of the final, 1542–1545 design for the tomb of Pope Julius II in San Pietro in Vincoli, on which it still remains.

== See also ==
- List of works by Michelangelo

== Bibliography ==
- (in Italian) Umberto Baldini, Michelangelo scultore, Rizzoli, Milano 1973.
- (in Italian) Marta Alvarez Gonzáles, Michelangelo, Mondadori Arte, Milano 2007. ISBN 978-88-370-6434-1
