= Paolo di Giovanni Fei =

Italian painter (c.1345–c.1411)

Paolo di Giovanni Fei (c. 1345 – c. 1411) was a painter of the Sienese school.

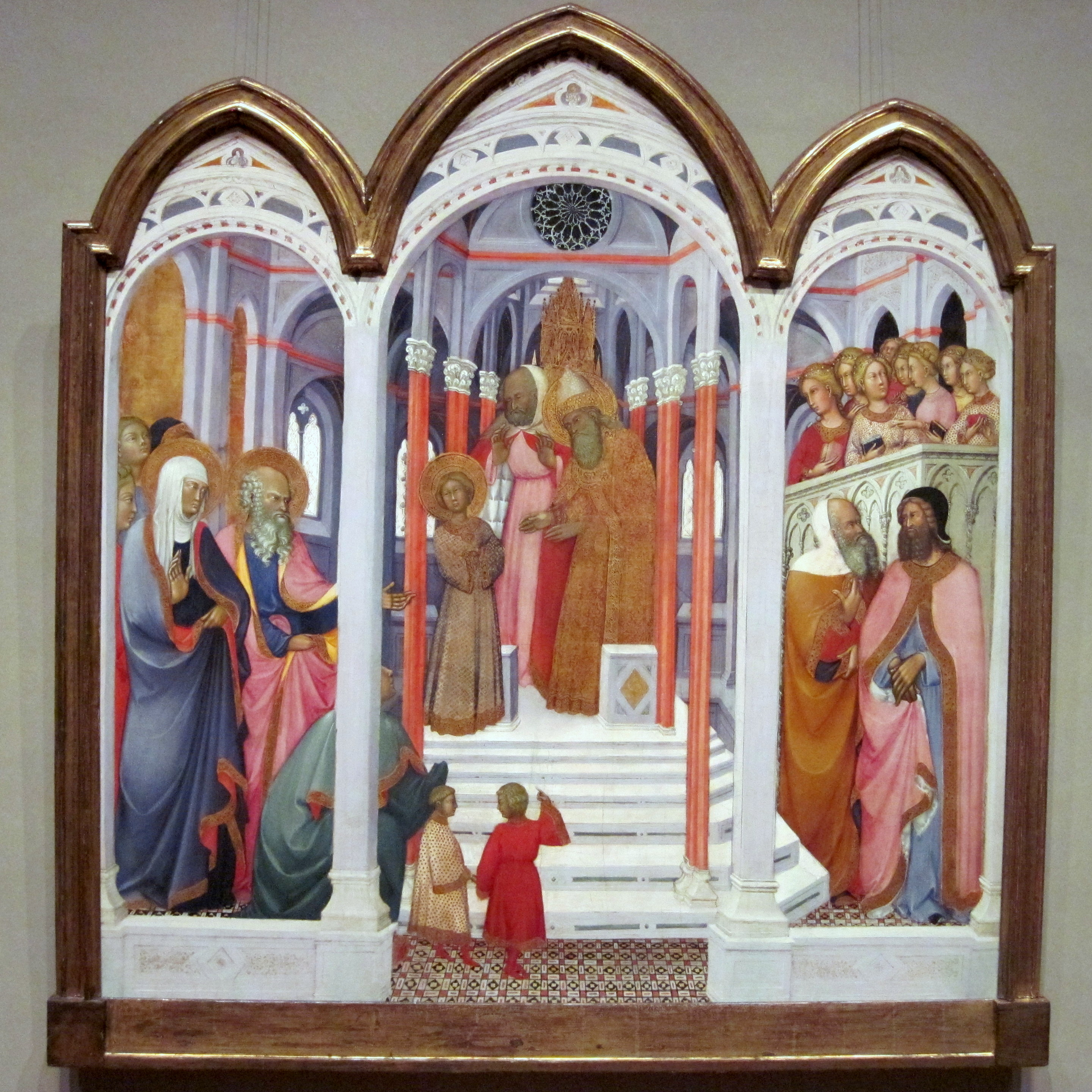
Presentation of the Virgin in National Gallery of Art

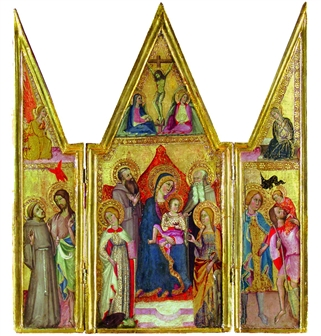
Madonna with Christ on the Throne in National Museum of Serbia (triptyh 48 x 45 cm, c. 1390)

He came to Siena from San Quirico, Castelvecchio, held public positions in Siena from 1369 and was first mentioned in the Sienese register of painters in 1389. His earliest signed and dated work is of 1381. He appears among the documents of the Duomo di Siena, 1395–1410, and is assumed to have died shortly thereafter. Paolo di Giovanni was influenced by the brothers Pietro Lorenzetti and Ambrogio Lorenzetti and by the Sienese masters Bartolo di Fredi and Simone Martini. His paintings are characterized by their bright clear palette often against a gilded and punched ground, and his wealth of naturalistic and ornamental detail.

His artistic personality was first elucidated by Bernard Berenson.

== Major works ==
- Madonna and Christ on the Throne, National Museum of Serbia, Belgrade
- Birth of the Virgin, Siena
- Presentation of the Virgin, National Gallery of Art, Washington, D.C.
- Enthroned Virgin and Child with Saints John the Baptist, Andrew, Francis and the Prophet Daniel, Siena
- Madonna and Child with Saints Francis and Louis of Toulouse with Angels, High Art Museum, Atlanta
- St Catherine of Alexandria, Städel Art Gallery, Frankfurt
