= List of works by Michelangelo =

The following is a list of works of painting, sculpture and architecture by the Italian Renaissance artist Michelangelo. Lost works are included, but not commissions that Michelangelo never made. Michelangelo also left many drawings, sketches, and some works in poetry.

== Sculpture ==
| Image | Title | Year | Location | Material | Dimensions |
|---|---|---|---|---|---|
| | Head of a Faun† | c. 1489–1494 | Lost in 1944 | Marble; Plaster cast | |
| | Madonna of the Stairs | c. 1491 | Casa Buonarroti, Florence | Marble | 55.5 × 40 cm |
| | Battle of the Centaurs | c. 1492 | Casa Buonarroti, Florence | Marble | 84.5 × 90.5 cm |
| | Hercules (in Italian) | c. 1492–1493 | Lost | Marble; Copy by Peter Paul Rubens | — |
| | Crucifix | c. 1493 | Santo Spirito, Florence | Polychrome wood | 142 × 135 cm |
| | Saint Petronius from the Ark of Saint Dominic | 1494–1495 | Basilica of San Domenico, Bologna | Marble | height 64 cm |
| | Saint Proculus from the Ark of Saint Dominic | 1494–1495 | Basilica of San Domenico, Bologna | Marble | height 58.5 cm |
| | Angel from the Ark of Saint Dominic | 1494–1495 | Basilica of San Domenico, Bologna | Marble | height 51.5 cm |
| | Sleeping Cupid | 1496 | Lost | Marble possibly a copy by Giulio Romano | — |
| | Bacchus | 1496–1497 | Museo Nazionale del Bargello, Florence | Marble | height 203 cm |
| | Cupid Apollo (in Italian) | 1497 | Lost | Marble possibly a study for the Standing Cupid | |
| | Pietà | 1498–1499 | St. Peter's Basilica, Rome | Marble | height 174 cm, width at the base 195 cm |
| | David | 1501–1504 | Galleria dell'Accademia, Florence | Marble | height 5.17 meters (17.0 feet) |
| | Madonna and Child (Madonna of Bruges) | 1501–1504 | Church of Our Lady, Bruges | Marble | height 128 cm |
| | David De Rohan (in Italian) | 1502–1508 | Lost | Bronze | |
| | Saint Paul | 1503–1504 | Siena Cathedral, Siena | Marble | |
| | Saint Peter | 1503–1504 | Siena Cathedral, Siena | Marble | |
| | Saint Pius | 1503–1504 | Siena Cathedral, Siena | Marble | |
| | Saint Gregory | 1503–1504 | Siena Cathedral, Siena | Marble | |
| | Madonna and Child (Tondo Pitti) | c. 1503 – 1504 | Museo Nazionale del Bargello, Florence | Marble | 85,8 × 82 cm |
| | Madonna and Child with the Infant Saint John (Taddei Tondo) | c. 1504 – 1506 | Royal Academy of Arts, London | Marble/Coon (a type of graphite) | diameter 82.5 cm |
| | Saint Matthew | c. 1505 | Galleria dell'Accademia, Florence | Marble | height 271 cm |
| | Tomb of Pope Julius II | 1505–1545 | San Pietro in Vincoli, Rome | | |
| | Statue of Julius II (destroyed 1511) | 1508 | Formerly Basilica of San Petronio, Bologna | Bronze | — |
| | Moses | c. 1513–1515 | San Pietro in Vincoli, Rome | | |
| | Rebellious Slave | 1513–1516 | Louvre, Paris | Marble | height 215 cm |
| | Dying Slave | 1513–1516 | Louvre, Paris | Marble | height 229 cm |
| | Young Slave scale model (in Italian) | c. 1520 | Victoria & Albert Museum, London | Wax | height 16,5 cm |
| | Young Slave | 1520–1523 | Galleria dell'Accademia, Florence | Marble | height 256 cm |
| | Atlas Slave | 1520–1523 | Galleria dell'Accademia, Florence | Marble | height 277 cm |
| | Awakening Slave | 1520–1523 | Galleria dell'Accademia, Florence | Marble | height 267 cm |
| | Bearded Slave | 1520–1523 | Galleria dell'Accademia, Florence | Marble | height 263 cm |
| | Medici Madonna | 1521–1534 | Medici Chapel, Basilica of San Lorenzo, Florence | Marble | height 226 cm |
| | Scale model for two Fighters (in Spanish) | c. 1525 | Casa Buonarroti, Florence | Clay | height 41 cm |
| | The Genius of Victory | c. 1532–1534 | Palazzo Vecchio, Florence | Marble | height 261 cm |
| | Rachel | 1545 | San Pietro in Vincoli, Rome | Marble | height 209 cm |
| | Leah | 1545 | San Pietro in Vincoli, Rome | Marble | height 197 cm |
| | Tomb of Giuliano de' Medici, Duke of Nemours (in Italian), Night and Day | c. 1526 – 1534 | Medici Chapel, Basilica of San Lorenzo, Florence | | |
| | Tomb of Lorenzo de' Medici, Duke of Urbino (in Italian), Dusk and Dawn | c. 1524 – 1534 | Medici Chapel, Basilica of San Lorenzo, Florence | | |
| | Apollo | c. 1530 | Museo Nazionale del Bargello, Florence | Marble | height 146 cm |
| | Crouching Boy | c. 1530 – 1534 | State Hermitage, Saint Petersburg | Marble | height 54 cm |
| | Cristo della Minerva (Christ Carrying the Cross) | 1519–1520 | church of Santa Maria sopra Minerva, Rome | Marble | height 205 cm |
| | Brutus | 1538 | Museo Nazionale del Bargello, Florence | Marble | height 95 cm |
| | Florentine Pietà | c. 1547 – 1553 | Museo dell'Opera del Duomo, Florence | Marble | height 253 cm |
| | Rondanini Pietà | 1552–1564 | Castello Sforzesco, Milan | Marble | height 195 cm |

== Attributed sculpture ==
| Image | Title | Year | Location | Material | Dimensions |
|---|---|---|---|---|---|
| | Young Archer (in Italian) | c. 1491–1492 | Metropolitan Museum of Art, New York | Marble | height 97 cm |
| | Venus and Cupid (in Italian) | c. 1491–1492 | Palazzo Medici-Riccardi, Florence | Marble | 43,5x58 cm |
| | Gallino Crucifix (in Italian) | c. 1495–1497 | Bargello Museum, Florence | Wood | 41,3×39,7 cm |
| | Young Saint John the Baptist | c. 1495–1497 | Sacred Chapel of El Salvador, Úbeda | Marble | height 130 cm |
| | es:Crucifijo de Montserrat (Miguel Ángel) (Crucifix of Montserrat) (in Spanish) | c. 1497–1498 | Santa Maria de Montserrat Abbey, Monistrol de Montserrat | Ivory | |
| | Naked man I (in Italian) | c. 1501–1504 | Casa Buonarroti, Florence | Terracotta | height 49 cm |
| | Importuno di Michelangelo | c. 1504 | Palazzo Vecchio, Florence | Pietraforte | |
| | Michelangelo Bronzes | 1506–1508 | Fitzwilliam Museum, Cambridge, England | Bronze | |
| | Male torso I (in Italian) | c. 1513 | Casa Buonarroti, Florence | Terracotta | height 23 cm |
| | Male torso II (in Italian) | c. 1513 | Casa Buonarroti, Florence | Terracotta | height 22,5 cm |
| | Naked woman scale model (in Italian) | c. 1513 or 1532 | Casa Buonarroti, Florence | Terracotta | height 35 cm |
| | Cristo della Minerva (first version?) (in Wikimedia) | c. 1514–1516 | San Vincenzo, Bassano Romano | Marble | |
| | Palestrina Pietà | c. 1555 | Galleria dell'Accademia, Florence | Marble | height 253 cm |
| | Christ of Guadalupe | 1560 | Guadalupe, Cáceres, Spain | Ivory | 20 cm |
| | Scale model for a Crucifix | c. 1562 | | Wood | height 20,5 cm |

== Painting ==
| Image | Details | Notes |
|---|---|---|
| | The Entombment c. 1500 – 1501 Tempera on panel 162 cm × 150 cm (64 in × 59 in) National Gallery, London | |
| | Doni Tondo (The Holy Family) c. 1503 – 1506 Oil and tempera on panel 120 cm (47 in) diameter Uffizi, Florence | |
| (copy by Aristotile da Sangallo) | The Battle of Cascina 1504 Lost | An unfinished fresco that was to be painted in the Palazzo Vecchio in Florence, in competition with Leonardo da Vinci's The Battle of Anghiari |
| Detail: The Creation of Adam | Sistine Chapel ceiling 1508–1512 Fresco Sistine Chapel, Rome | |
| | The Last Judgment 1536–1541 Fresco 1,370 cm × 1,200 cm (540 in × 470 in) Sistine Chapel, Rome | |
| (copy by Peter Paul Rubens) | Leda and the Swan c. 1530 Egg tempera on panel Lost | |
| | The Conversion of Saul c. 1542 – 1545 Fresco 625 cm × 661 cm (246 in × 260 in) Cappella Paolina, Vatican Palace, Rome | |
| | The Crucifixion of Saint Peter c. 1546 – 1550 Fresco 625 cm × 662 cm (246 in × 261 in) Cappella Paolina, Vatican Palace, Rome | |

== Attributed paintings ==
| Image | Details | Notes |
|---|---|---|
| | The Torment of Saint Anthony c. 1487 – 1488 Oil and tempera on panel 47 cm × 35 cm (18 1/2 in × 13 3/4 in) Kimbell Art Museum, purchased from Sotheby's auction, Catalogue of Old Masters sale (Lot No. 69), 9 July 2008 by Adam Williams Fine Art, New York, as "Workshop of Domenico Ghirlandaio". Subsequently purchased by the Kimbell Art Museum, Fort Worth, Texas and attributed to Michelangelo. | |
| | Madonna and Child with Saint John and Angels (The Manchester Madonna) c. 1497 Tempera on panel 105 cm × 76 cm (41 in × 30 in) National Gallery, London | |

== Architecture ==
| Image | Building | City | Notes |
|---|---|---|---|
| | Chapel of Leo X Castel Sant'Angelo 1514–1515 | Rome | |
| (model in Casa Buonarroti) | Facade for the Basilica of San Lorenzo Basilica of San Lorenzo 1516–1520 | Florence | Unexecuted |
| | New Sacristy (Medici Chapel) Basilica of San Lorenzo 1520–1534 | Florence | |
| | Laurentian Library Basilica of San Lorenzo 1523–1559 | Florence | |
| | Plans for new City fortifications 1528–1529 | Florence | |
| | Tribune for the Relics Basilica of San Lorenzo 1531–1532 | Florence | |
| | Piazza del Campidoglio complex Capitoline Hill 1536–1546 | Rome | |
| | Palazzo Farnese 1546 | Rome | |
| | Plans for St. Peter's Basilica (especially for the dome) 1546–1564 | Rome | |
| | Plans for San Giovanni dei Fiorentini 1559–1560 | Rome | |
| | Sforza Chapel Basilica of Santa Maria Maggiore c. 1560 | Rome | |
| | Porta Pia 1561–1565 | Rome | |
| | Interior remodeling of Santa Maria degli Angeli e dei Martiri 1563–1564 | Rome | |

== Presentation drawings and cartoons ==
| Image | Details | Notes |
|---|---|---|
| | The Dream of Human Life c. 1533 Black chalk on laid paper 39.8 × 27.8 cm Courtauld Institute of Art, London | |
| | The Fall of Phaëthon 1533 31.2 × 21.5 cm British Museum, London | |
| | Pietà for Vittoria Colonna c. 1538–44 Black chalk on paper 28.9 × 18.9 cm Isabella Stewart Gardner Museum, Boston | |
| | Crucified Christ c. 1541 36.8 × 26.8 cm British Museum, London | |
| | Epifania c. 1550–3 232.7 × 165.6 cm British Museum, London | |
| | Madonna del Silenzio c. 1538 The Portland Collection, Nottinghamshire | |
