= Giovanni di Cecco =

Italian sculptor and architect

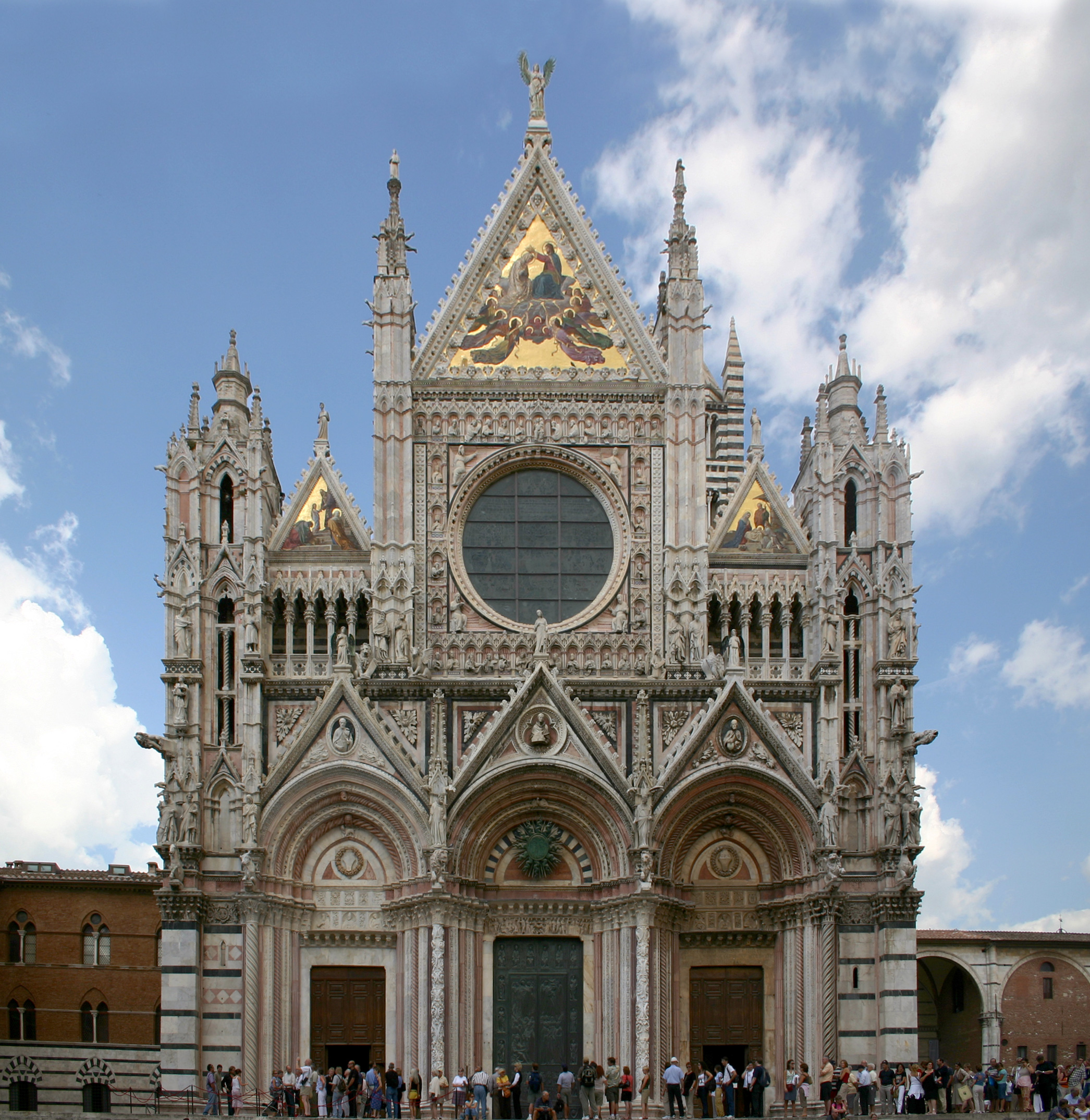
The facade of Siena Cathedral

Giovanni di Cecco was a Late Gothic architect and sculptor who worked in the region of Siena, Italy, in the 14th century.

Giovanni di Cecco is known for his work on the facade of Siena Cathedral, which was begun by Giovanni Pisano, worked on by several architects and had stalled by 1317. Giovanni di Cecco appears to have taken over direction of the work in the mid-14th century, but the date is uncertain. The facade was completed around 1370. Giovanni di Cecco appears to have modified the designs of his predecessors to create a more Gothic appearance with high gables and pinnacles, all decorated with crockets, under the influence of Orvieto Cathedral.

As a sculptor, Giovanni di Cecco carved the baptismal font of the Collegiate Church of San Gimignano. It is hexagonal with carved panels, the central one being the Baptism of Jesus. The work is signed and dated, and was commissioned by the Wool-workers Guild. It stands in an open loggia beside the church, beneath a fresco of the Annunciation by Sebastiano Mainardi.

== See also ==
- Giovanni Pisano
- Arnolfo di Cambio
- Duccio
