= Ascanio Condivi =

Italian painter and writer (1525–1574)

- Born: 1525; Ripatransone, Marche
- Died: 10 December 1574 (aged 48–49); Menocchia
- Occupations: Painter and writer
- Relatives: Latino Condivi (father); Vitangela de' Ricci (mother)

Ascanio Condivi (1525 – 10 December 1574) was an Italian painter and writer. Generally regarded as a mediocre artist, he is primarily remembered as the biographer of Michelangelo.

== Biography ==
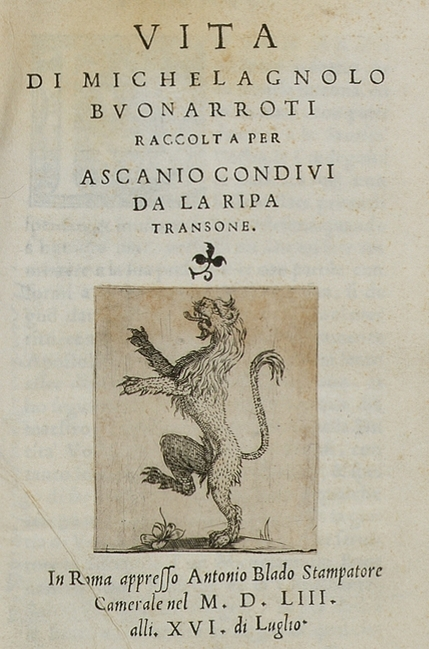
Title page of Vita di Michelagnolo Buonarroti written by Ascanio Condivi, printed by Antonio Blado

The son of Latino Condivi and Vitangela de' Ricci, Ascanio Condivi was a nobleman born in the town of Ripatransone in the Marche.

He moved to Rome in c. 1545, where he became an acquaintance of Michelangelo. In 1553 he published Vita di Michelagnolo [sic] Buonarroti, an authorised account of Michelangelo's life over which his subject had complete control. The Vita was partly a rebuttal of hostile rumours that were being perpetuated about the artist, namely that he was arrogant, avaricious, jealous of other artists, and reluctant to take on pupils. It also served to correct inaccuracies Michelangelo found in the fawning biography of him in Giorgio Vasari's Vite de' più eccellenti pittori, scultori, ed architettori ("Lives of the most excellent painters, sculptors and architects"), which was later revised considerably by Vasari in the wake of Condivi's biography. Condivi's Vita denies that Michelangelo was indebted to any other artist and claims that he was self-taught (he was in fact a pupil of Domenico Ghirlandaio). Also, much is made of his supposed descent from the Counts of Canossa, although this belief of Michelangelo's was utterly unfounded. Due to its literary qualities some scholars believe that the poet Annibale Caro had a hand in the writing of the Vita.

After the publication of the Vita Condivi returned to Ripatransone, where he undertook civic duties, married, and devoted himself to painting religious subjects. One of these paintings, the unfinished and ambiguously themed Holy Family and other figures (now in the Casa Buonarroti, Florence), relied completely for its composition on a cartoon provided by Michelangelo. The cartoon, known as the Epifania as it was once erroneously believed to depict the Epiphany, is now housed in the British Museum, London.

Condivi died on 10 December 1574, because of a sudden flood while fording the torrent Menocchia, down the valley north of his birth town.
