= Crucifix (disambiguation) =

A crucifix is a cross with a representation of Jesus Christ, as used in Christian symbolism.

Crucifix may also refer to:

== Arts ==
- Crucifix (Cimabue, Arezzo), a large wooden crucifix dated to c. 1267-71
- Crucifix (Cimabue, Santa Croce), distemper on wood painting dated to c. 1265
- Crucifix (Michelangelo), a 1492 sculpture
- Crucifix (Núñez Delgado), a 1599 sculpture
- Crucifix (band), an American hardcore punk band from Berkeley, California
- The Crucifix, a 1934 film directed by G.B. Samuelson

== Sports ==
- Crucifix (horse), a British Thoroughbred race horse
- Crucifix position, a grappling position that involves being perpendicularly behind the opponent
- Iron cross (gymnastics), an extremely difficult gymnastic skill performed on rings
- Chest fly, a strength training exercise; see Fly (exercise)
- Crucifix neck crank, a grappling hold performed on a mounted opponent

== Other ==
- Crucifix Hill, a World War II battle that took place on October 8, 1944, in Haarberg
