= Brunelleschi Crucifix =

Sculpture by Filippo Brunelleschi

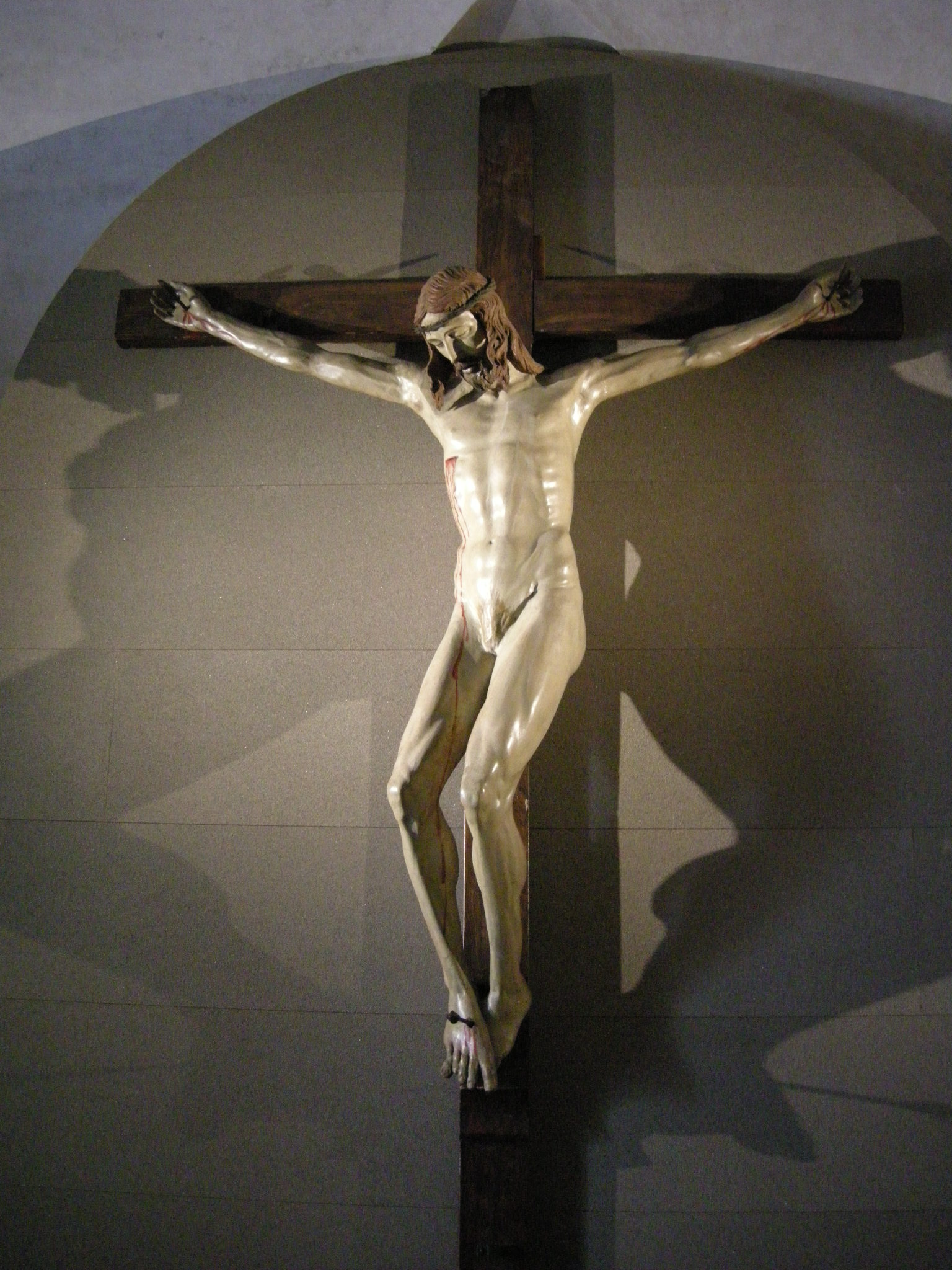
Brunelleschi Crucifix, Gondi Chapel, Santa Maria Novella, Florence

The Brunelleschi Crucifix is a polychrome painted wooden sculpture by the Italian artist Filippo Brunelleschi, made from pearwood around 1410-1415, and displayed since 1572 in the Gondi Chapel at the church of Santa Maria Novella in Florence. This idealised depiction of the crucifixion of Jesus measures around 170 cm × 170 cm (67 in × 67 in). It is the only surviving wooden sculpture by Brunelleschi: the only other known example, a wooden sculpture of Mary Magdalene at the church of Santo Spirito, was destroyed in a fire in 1471. In his 2002 book, Masaccio e le origini del Rinascimento, the art historian Luciano Bellosi described Brunelleschi's crucifix as "probably the first Renaissance work in the history of art" ("probabilmente, la prima opera rinascimentale della storia dell'arte"), representing a definitive turn away from the stylised postures of Gothic sculpture and a return to the naturalism of classical sculpture.

According to Giorgio Vasari, the sculpture was Brunelleschi's response to a similar polychrome wooden crucifix made by Donatello for the church of Santa Croce, also in Florence, c.1406-1408. Brunelleschi had criticized Donatello's crucifix for its heavy musculature and unrefined proportions, saying Donatello had put "un contadino in croce" (a peasant – or farmer – on the cross). Brunelleschi made his crucifix after accepting Donatello's challenge to do better.

Superficially similar to Donatello's depiction of Christ on the cross, Brunelleschi's subject is more idealised, lighter, and better proportioned. Like Donatello, Brunelleschi borrows Christ's pose from the 5 m (16 ft) high painted crucifix by Giotto, suspended in the nave at Santa Maria Novella, but Brunelleschi gives the figure a dynamic twist to the left. The central figure of Jesus is also informed by life studies, but carefully measured to create a perfect anatomy. Echoing the proportions of the ideal Vitruvian man, the span of Christ's arms match exactly his height, with the navel at the centre of the body.

Earlier sculptures of the crucifixion, including Donatello's, usually included a carved loincloth. The pearwood of Brunelleschi's sculpture suffered from radial cracks in this area, which he concealed with a stiffened linen loincloth, but he did not sculpt Christ's genitals beneath. The practice of sculpting Jesus naked, but omitting the genitals, became common in the 15th century, although Michelangelo's crucifix at Santo Spirito from 1492 is an exception.

Whether or not it was made to answer Donatello's challenge, it appears the sculpture was not made to fulfil a particular commission, as the completed artwork remained in Brunelleschi's workshop until 1445, the year before his death, when the artist donated it to the Dominican friars of Santa Maria Novella. It was initially installed on a pilaster between the Filippo Strozzi Chapel and the Bardi Chapel, but it was moved to the Gondi Chapel in 1572.

It has been restored several times, and was displayed in 2012 alongside the earlier wooden crucifix of Donatello and the later crucifix of Michelangelo.

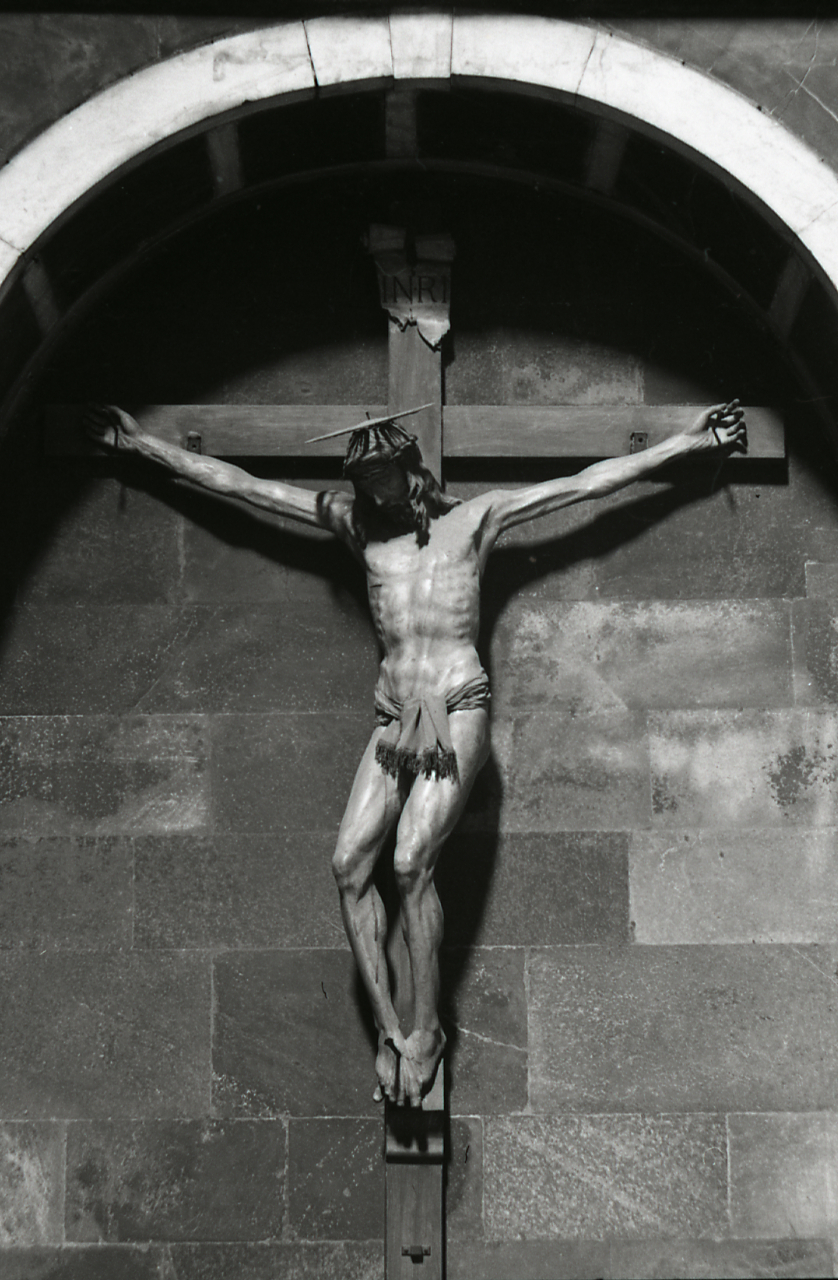
Brunelleschi Crucifix in 1975

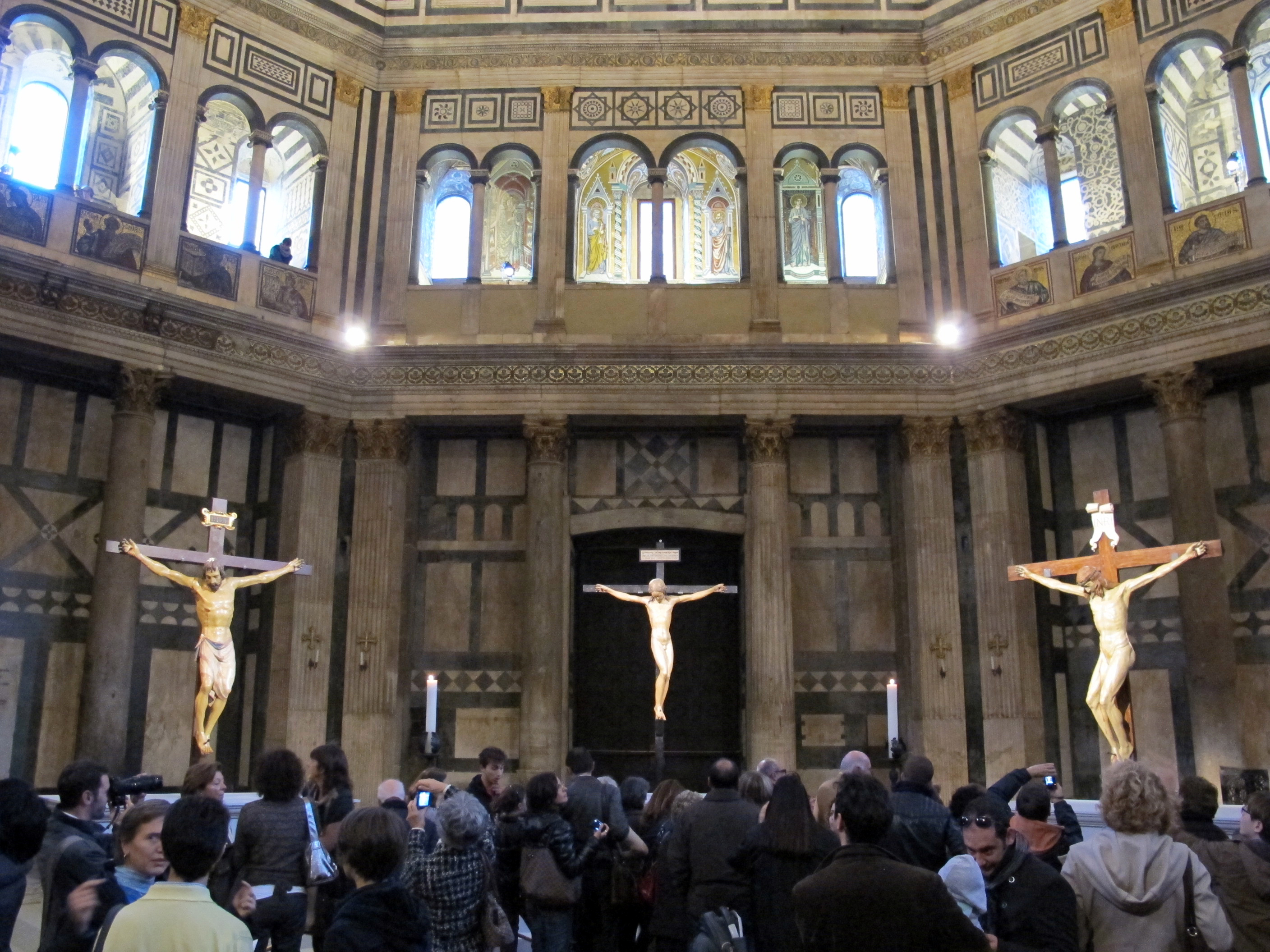
Exhibited in 2012 (right), beside the crucifix of Michelangelo (centre) and crucifix of Donatello (left).

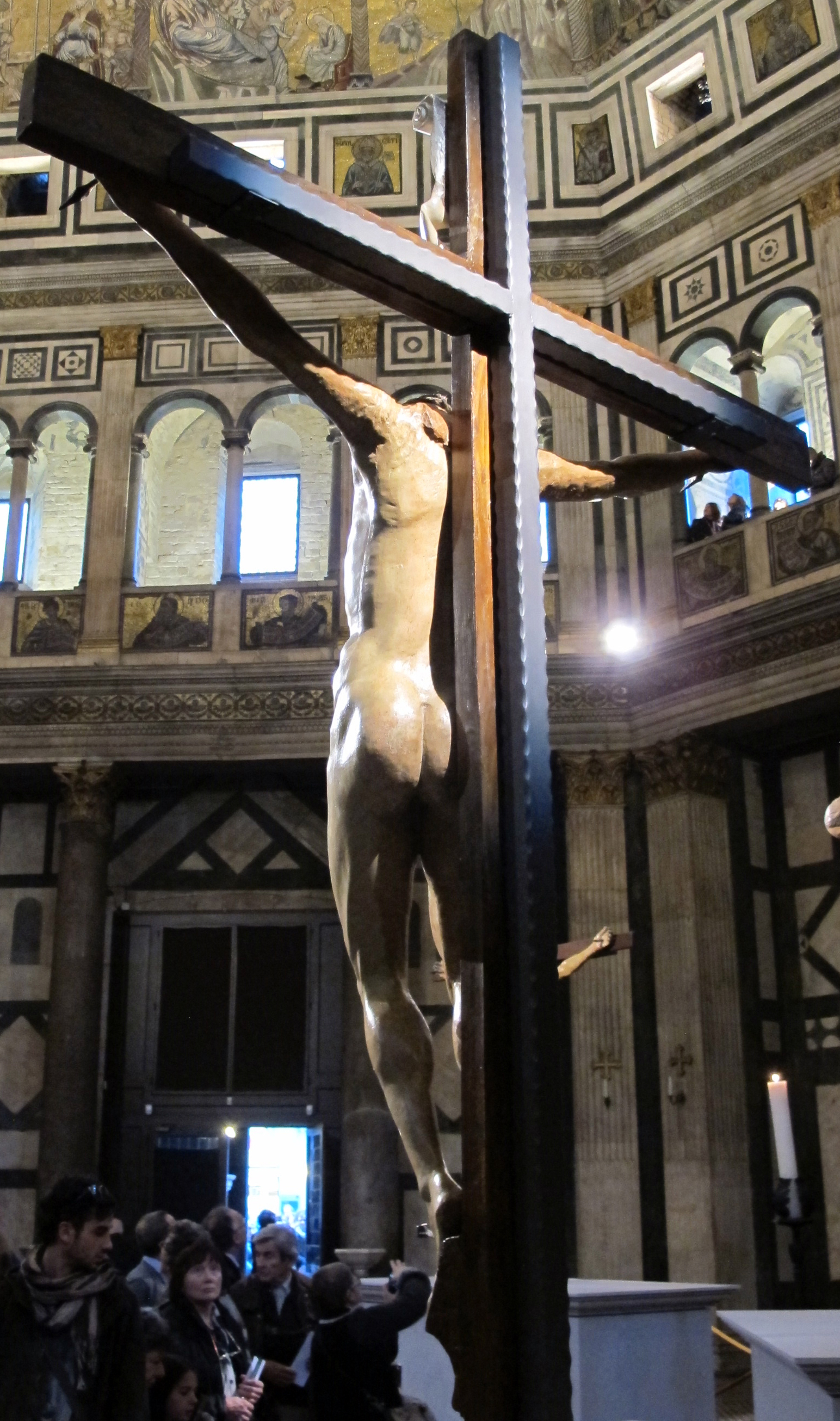
Rear view from 2012 exhibition

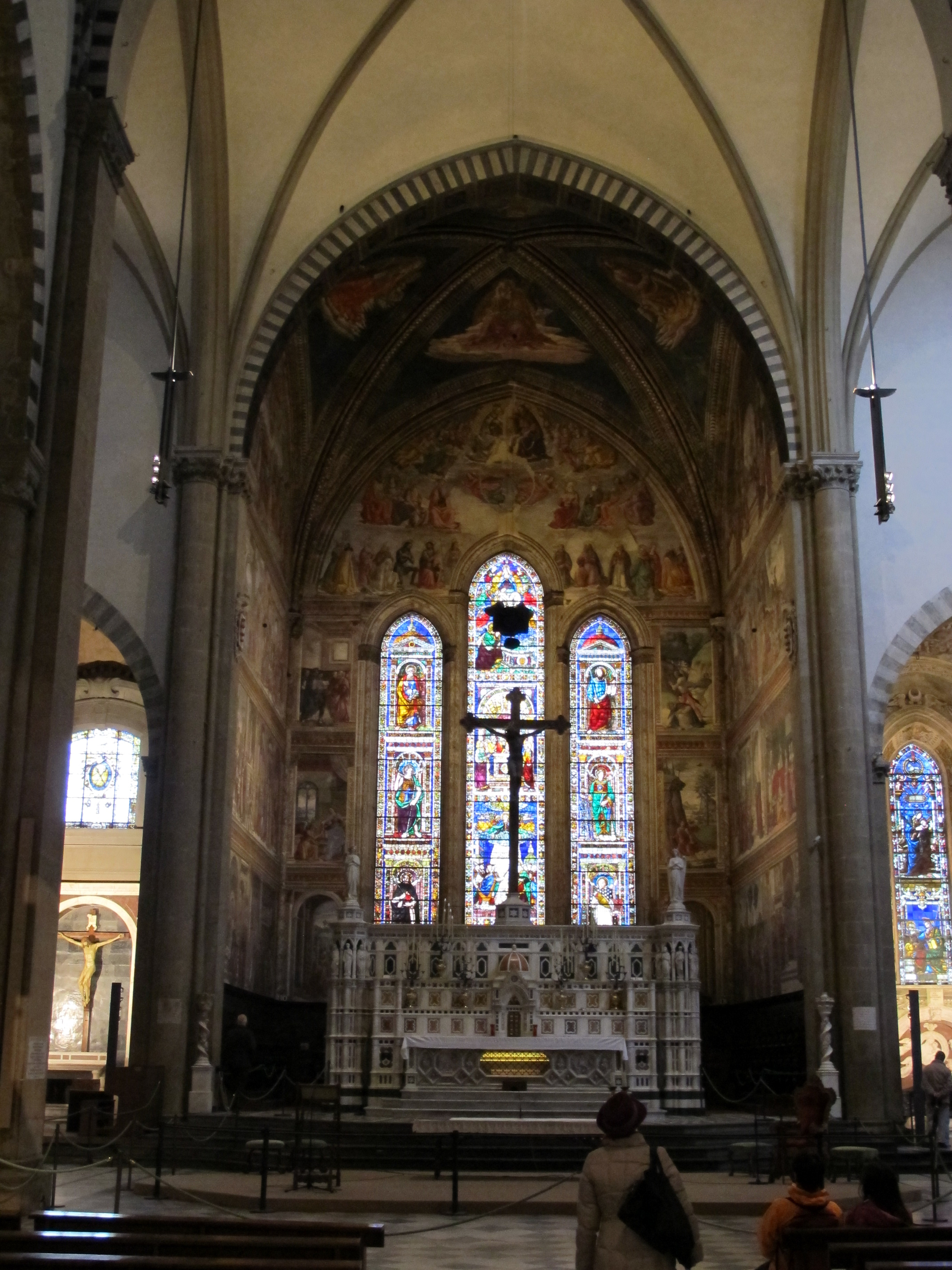
Displayed in the chapel to the left of the main altar at Santa Maria Novella

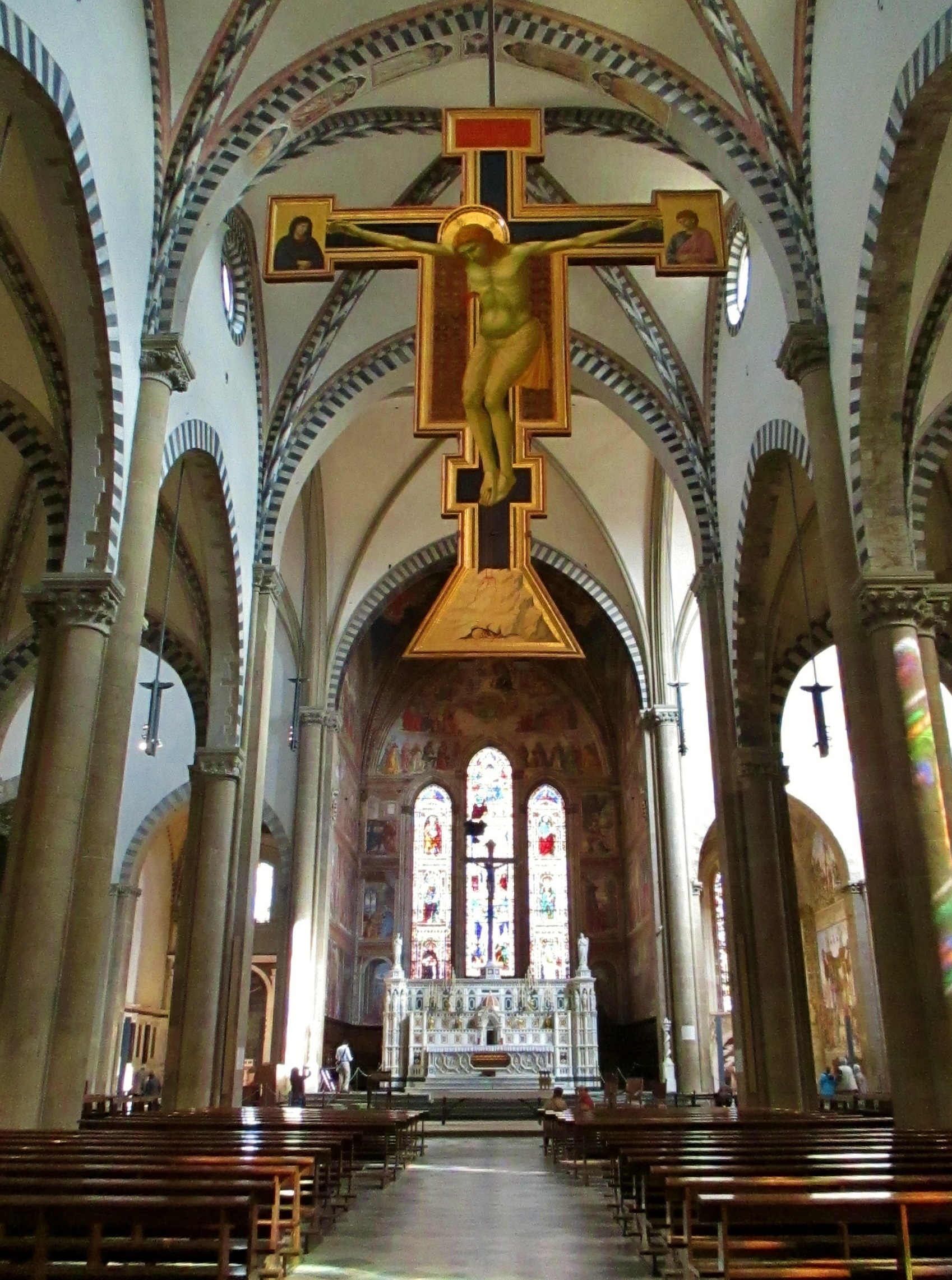
Giotto's painted Crucifix with the Madonna and John the Evangelist, hanging in the nave at Santa Maria Novella
