= Michelangelo Buonarroti the Younger =

Italian writer

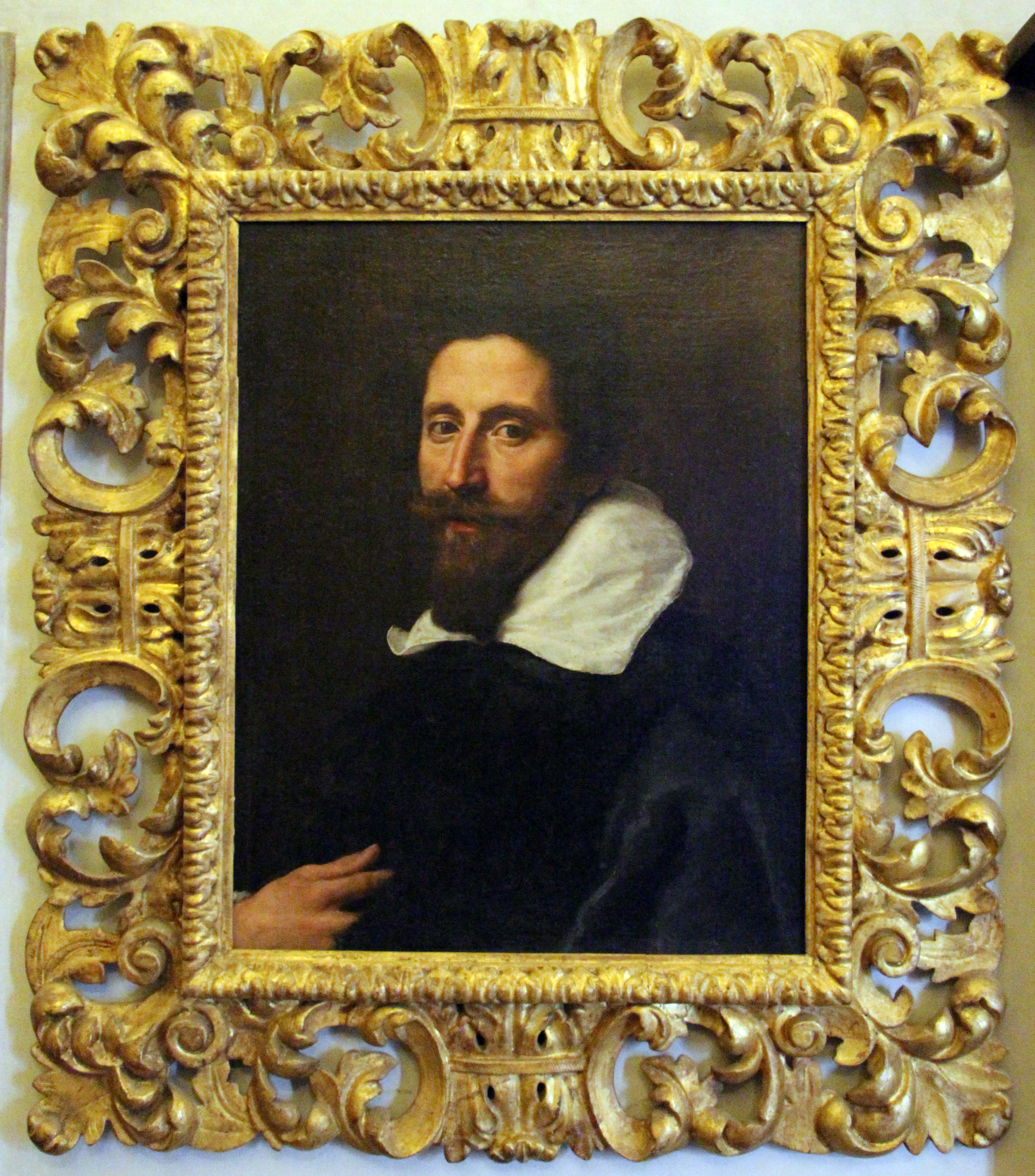
Portrait by Cristofano Allori (Casa Buonarroti, Florence)

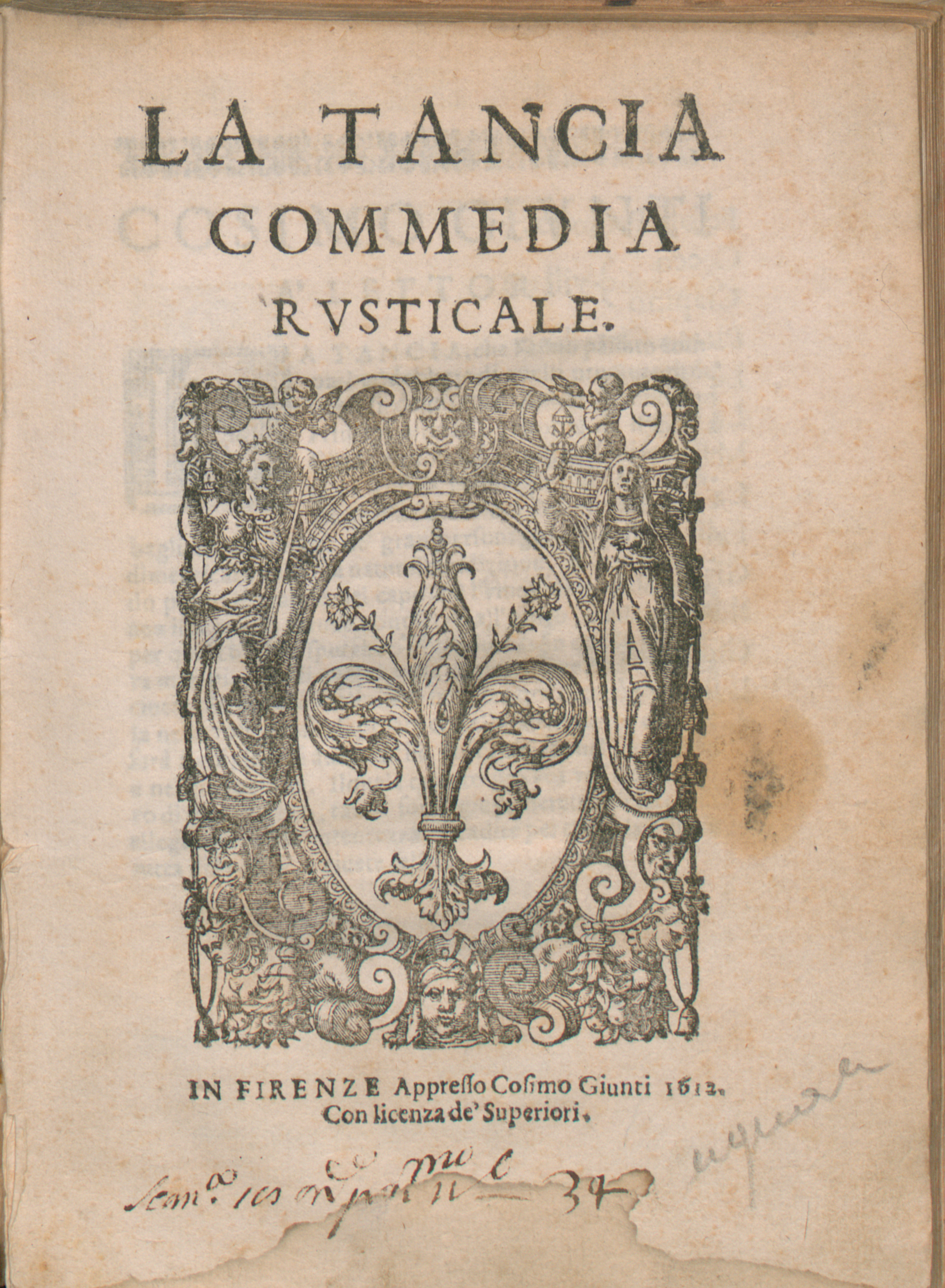
La tancia (1612)

Michelangelo Buonarroti il Giovane the Younger (baptized 4 November 1568 – 11 January 1646) was a Florentine poet, librettist and man of letters, known as "the Younger" to distinguish him from his granduncle, Michelangelo.

== Education ==
From 1588 to 1591 he studied mathematics at the University of Pisa, where he became friends with Galileo Galilei and Maffeo Barberini, the future Pope Urban VIII.

== Career ==
Buonarroti was elected to the Accademia Fiorentina in 1585 and the Accademia della Crusca in 1589, and was one of the editors of first Italian dictionary, Vocabolario degli Accademici della Crusca (1612).

After the wedding of Marie de' Medici and Henry IV of France in 1600, Buonarroti published a Description of the banquet and was soon commissioned to write court entertainments: Il natal d'Ercole (1605), Il giudizio di Paride (for the wedding of Cosimo II and Maria Maddalena, 1608, music by Jacopo Peri), La Tancia (1611) and Balletto della Cortesia (1614).

In 1612, Buonarroti began construction of a gallery (now the Casa Buonarroti) on the Via Ghibellino dedicated to his famous relative and commissioned numerous artists to paint murals, including Artemisia Gentileschi (WP Commons gallery). During this period his name became linked with Francesca Caccini, who composed the music for La Tancia, the Balletto and La Fiera.

Buonarroti's career as a courtier took a turn for the worse when the Grand Duchess Christina of Lorraine took offense at salacious language in Fiera (1619). In 1623 he dedicated the publication of verse by the Elder Michelangelo to his friend Maffeo Barberini, newly installed as Pope Urban VIII, and sought patronage from other members of the Barberini family. The last of his theatre pieces was La Siringa, performed at the Palazzo Vecchio in 1634. In 1640 he lost his fortune in a bank failure at a time when the Wars of Castro (in which Rome and Florence took opposite sides) complicated relations with the Barberinis. His final years were spent writing the Satires. He is buried in Santa Croce.

== Legacy ==
Buonarroti's lyrics are found among many 17-century composers' musiche as well as in Luigi Dallapiccola's Sei Cori di Michelangelo Buonarroti il Giovane (1933).

== Bibliography ==
- Janie Cole: A Muse of Music in Early Baroque Florence: The Poetry of Michelangelo Buonarroti il Giovane. Fondazione Carlo Marchi 33. Florence: Leo S. Olschki, 2007 ISBN 978-88-222-5704-8.
- Janie Cole: Cultural Brokerage and Music-Theatre in Early Modern Italy: Michelangelo Buonarroti il Giovane 2011 ISBN 978-88-222-5989-9

== See also ==
- Accademia delle Arti del Disegno
