= Santa Croce Crucifix (Donatello) =

Sculpture by Donatello

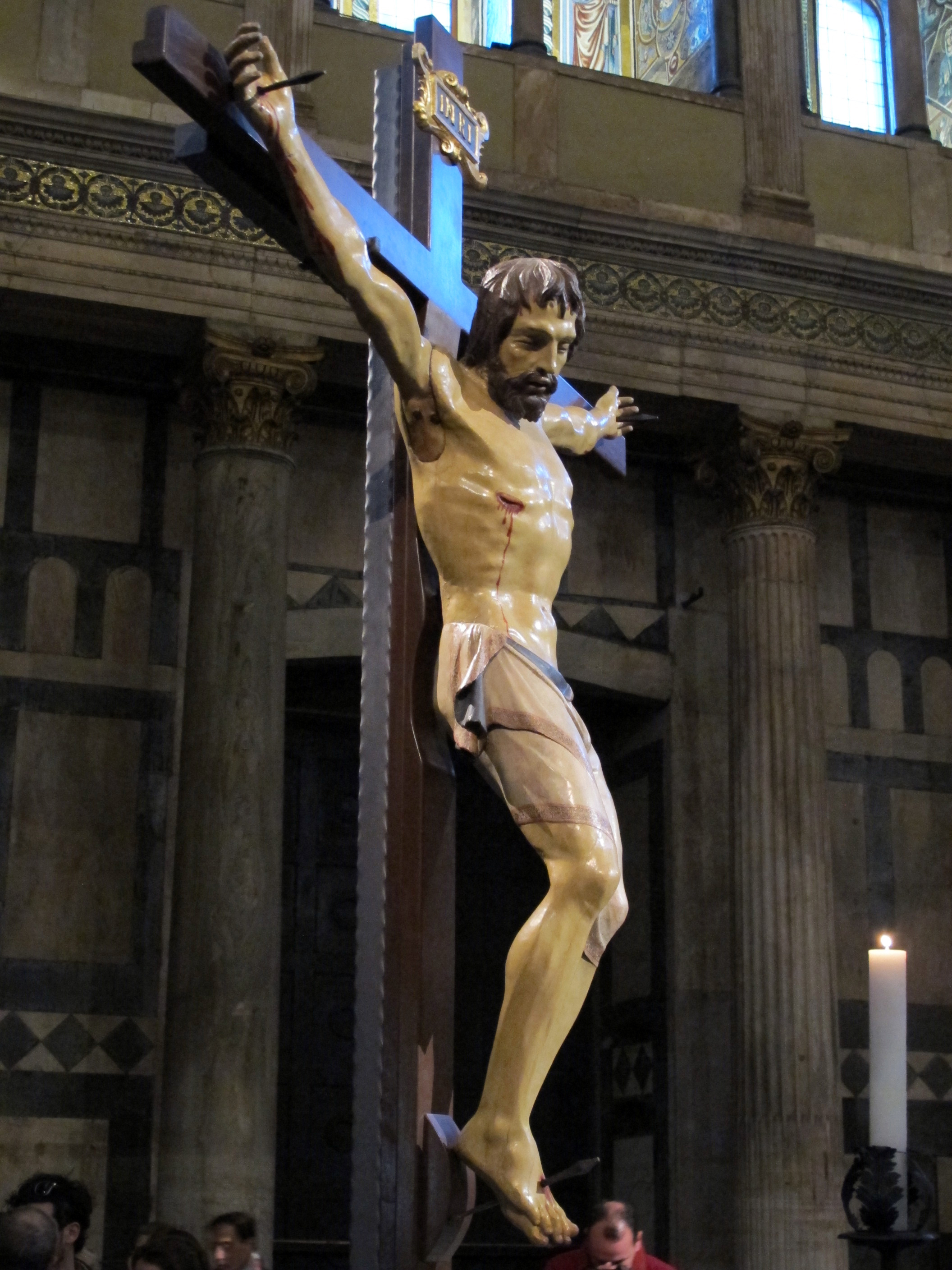

The Santa Croce Crucifix is a polychrome wood sculpture by Donatello, perhaps from c.1406-1408, or 1409–10. If the former is the correct dating, then Donatello was a young artist working in Lorenzo Ghiberti's workshop and beginning to get his own commissions. It is now in the Cappella Bardi di Vernio, just off the left transept of Santa Croce in Florence, Italy.

== History ==
According to the Book of Antonio Billi (a manuscript of about 1515 in the Biblioteca Nazionale Centrale di Firenze), quoted and added to in Vasari's Lives of the Artists, the work was originally in the church's cappella Barbigia. There it was criticised by Donatello's friend Filippo Brunelleschi (who had gone with him to Rome) as showing a "contadino" (farmer) on a cross, that is for its unusual realism. This spurred Brunelleschi to produce for Santa Maria Novella in c.1410-1415 his own crucifix - Donatello's first sight of that work made him drop the eggs he was carrying.

The Anonimo Magliabechiano, probably writing in the 1530s or 1540s, also attributes the work to Donatello, as does Vasari in a letter to Matteo Benvenuti dated 29 December 1571 recording its move to its present chapel. A few art historians have disputed this attribution and instead assigned the work to Nanni di Banco or another sculptor. Johnson identifies the work in Billi, Magliabechiano and Vasari with the crucifix at the Bosco ai Frati Monastery, but that work is now generally considered to date to between 1450 and 1499 instead.
