= Head of a Faun =

Sculpture by Michelangelo

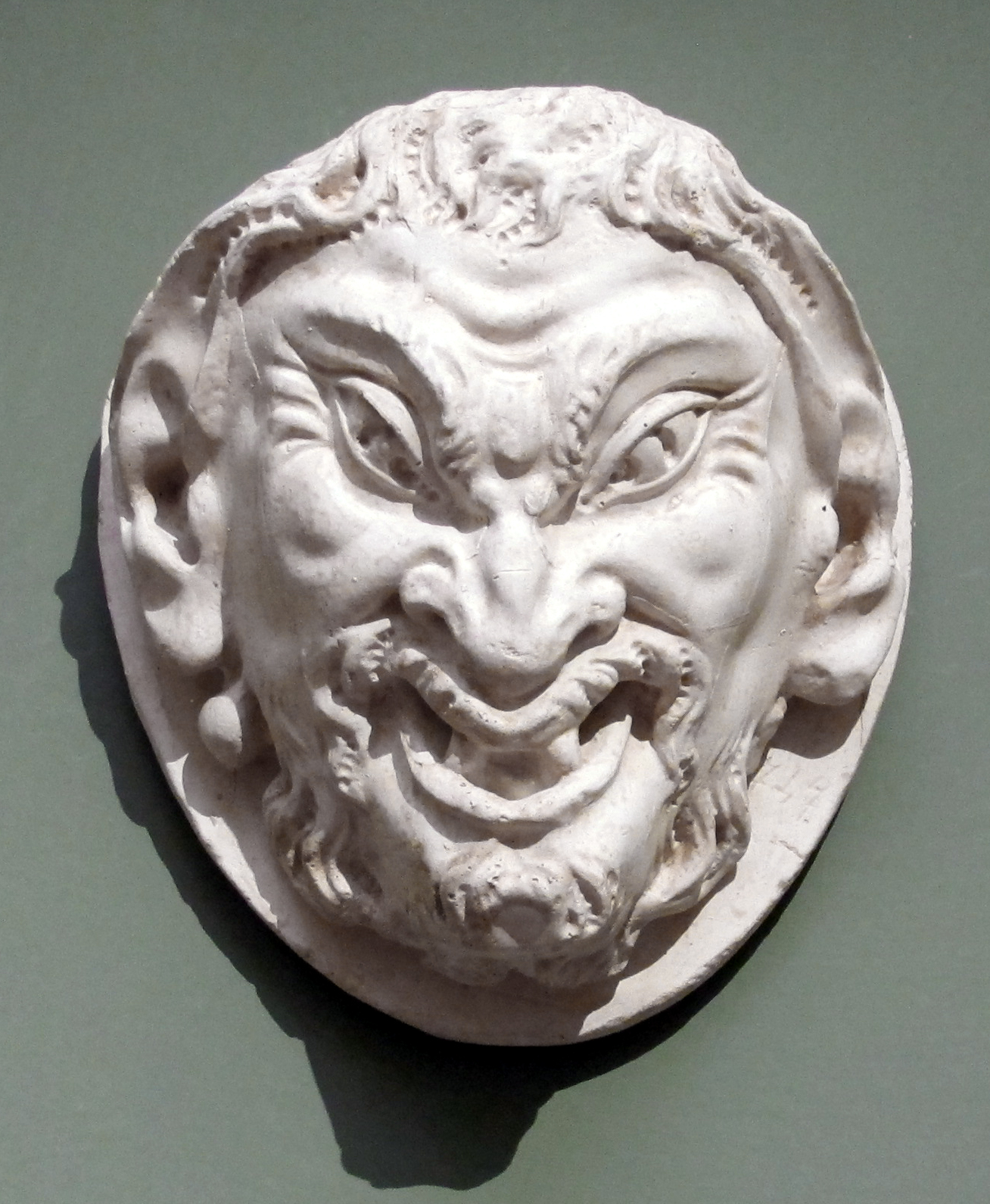
- Cast of a head in Bargello Museum until 1944, once attributed as Michelangelo's Head of a Faun
- Artist: Michelangelo
- Year: c. 1489
- Type: Marble
- Followed by: Madonna of the Stairs

Head of a Faun is a lost sculpture by Italian Renaissance master Michelangelo, dating from c. 1489. It is his earliest known work of sculpture in marble, sculpted when he was 15 or 16 as a copy of an antique work with some minor alterations. According to Giorgio Vasari's biography of Michelangelo, it was the creation of this work that secured the young Michelangelo the patronage of Lorenzo de' Medici.

== See also ==
- List of works by Michelangelo

== Sources ==
- Artists Life — Michelangelo, page 14,15 — Enrica Crispino, 2001, Giunti Editore.
- The Life of Michelangelo Buonarroti, page 23 — John Addington Symonds, BiblioBazaar.
- Michael Angelo: Giorgio Vasari's Lives of the Artists, Fordham University
