= Casa Buonarroti =

Museum in Florence, Italy

Coordinates: 43°46′11.65″N 11°15′49.53″E

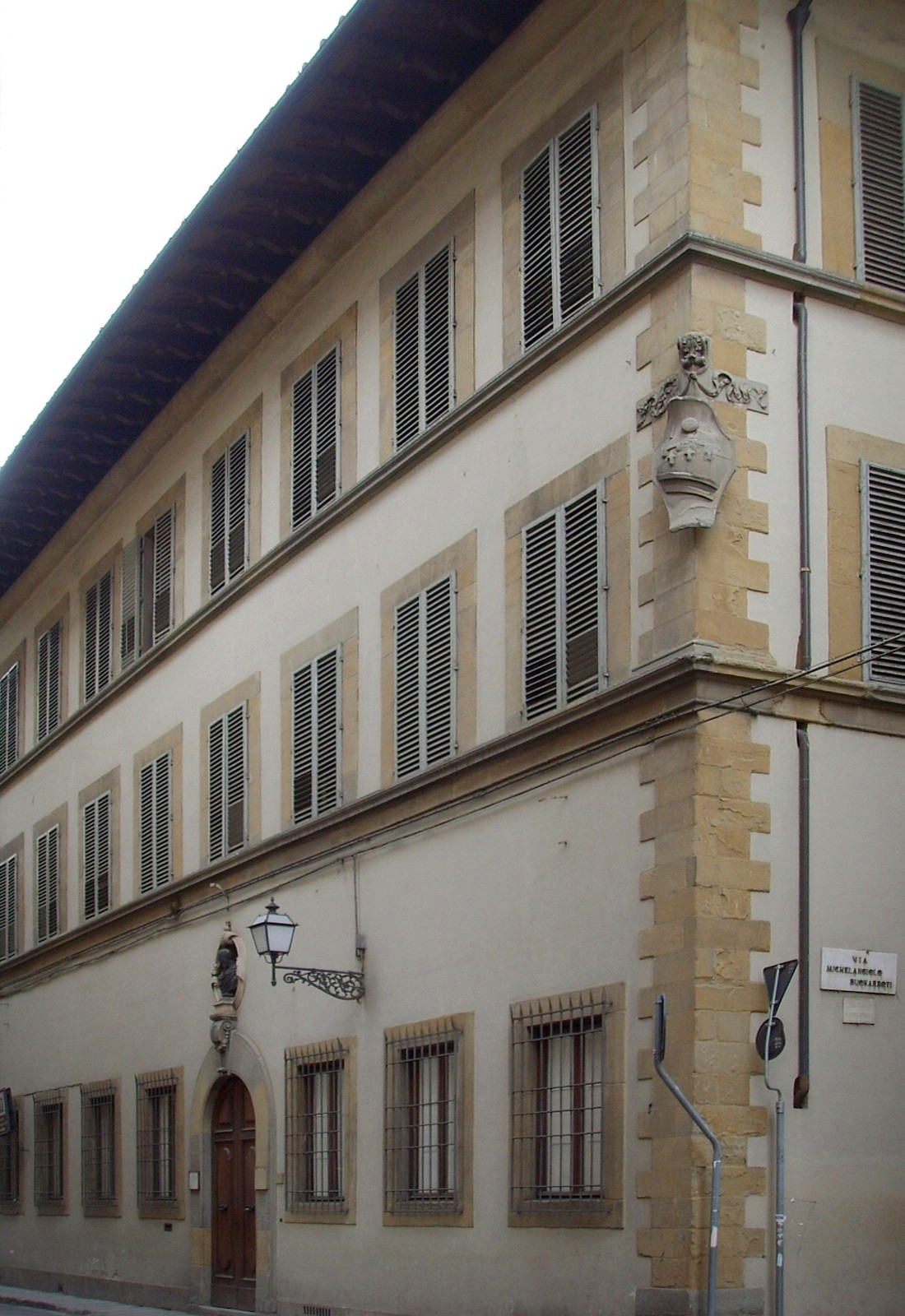
- Location: Via Ghibellina 70, Florence, Italy
- Website: www.casabuonarroti.it

Casa Buonarroti (Good Fortune House) is a museum in Florence, Italy that is situated on property owned by the sculptor Michelangelo that he left to his nephew, Leonardo Buonarroti. The complex of buildings was converted into a museum dedicated to the artist by his great nephew, Michelangelo Buonarroti the Younger. Its collections include two of Michelangelo's earliest marble sculptures, the Madonna of the Stairs and the Battle of the Centaurs. A ten-thousand book library includes the family archive and some of Michelangelo's letters and drawings. The Galleria is decorated with paintings commissioned by Buonarroti the Younger and was created by Artemisia Gentileschi and other early seventeenth-century Italian artists.

== History ==
On 3 March 1508, Michelangelo, who had moved temporarily to Rome three years earlier to work on the Tomb of Pope Julius II, bought four adjoining buildings in Florence at the corner of via Ghibellina and via Santa Maria (now via Buonarroti), just north of the Basilica di Santa Croce. He acquired another adjacent structure in April 1514. These five buildings were the nucleus of what later would become the Casa Buonarroti.

Michelangelo occupied the two most spacious buildings of the complex from 1516 to 1525, renting out the other three. During that period he was working on the façade of the Basilica of San Lorenzo in Florence. In 1525, he moved to another residence in Florence and all five buildings were rented out.

After moving permanently to Rome in 1534, Michelangelo became increasingly obsessed with the idea of having an "honorable home" in his native city of Florence, as a palace that would represent his family with dignity. He repeatedly asked his nephew Leonardo (1519–1599) to transform the five buildings at the corner of via Ghibellina and via Santa Maria into a family palace, but no work was initiated. Upon the death of Michelangelo, Leonardo inherited the estate of his uncle. Showing little interest in the project, however, Leonardo committing only to a partial restoration of the complex that was carried out in 1590, 26 years after Michelangelo's death.

The palace Michelangelo desired finally was created and was given its present configuration by one of Leonardo's sons, Michelangelo Buonarroti the Younger (1568–1647), who further expanded the complex by purchasing an adjacent lot. He had the buildings reconfigured into a unified structure. Following the concept of the piano nobile, he arranged four monumental rooms dedicated to the celebration of his great-uncle and his family. He also dedicated a gallery for displaying the works of art in his art collection, including Michelangelo's Madonna of the Stairs, his earliest known work in marble, and the Battle of the Centaurs.

Michelangelo the Younger commissioned a number of contemporary Italian artists to decorate the interior rooms, including the work of Artemisia Gentileschi, Cecco Bravo, Pietro da Cortona, Jacopo da Empoli, Francesco Furini, Giovanni da San Giovanni, Domenico Passignano, Ottavio Vannini, and Jacopo Vignali.

In 1962, Santo Spirito Crucifix was put on display at the museum and investigations into its authenticity ensued. The investigations confirmed the attribution to Michelangelo in 2001 and determined that the sculpture was made for the high altar of the Church of Santo Spirito di Firenze in Florence, perhaps as early as 1492 when Michelangelo was a teenager. The crucifix now hangs in the octagonal sacristy of the Basilica of Santa Maria del Santo Spirito.

== Main works in the collections ==
Michelangelo

- Madonna of the Stairs, c. 1491
- Battle of the Centaurs, c. 1492
- Wooden model for façade of San Lorenzo

Artemisia Gentileschi

- Allegory of Inclination, 1615–1616

=== Gallery ===
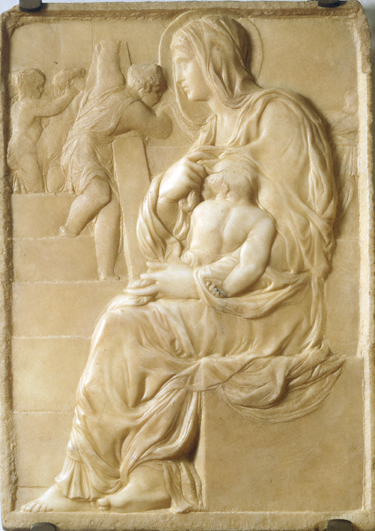
Madonna of the Stairs

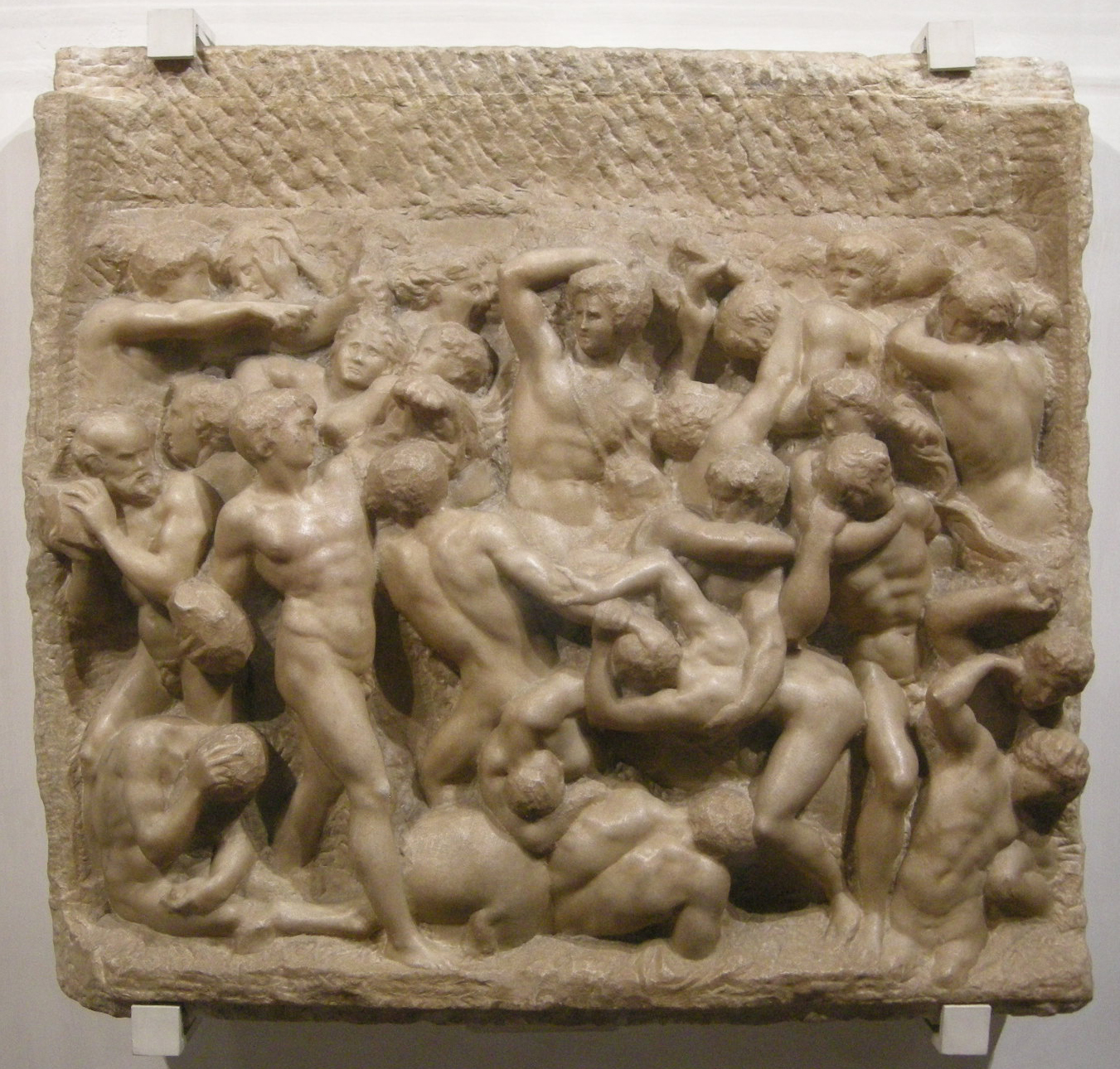
Battle of the Centaurs

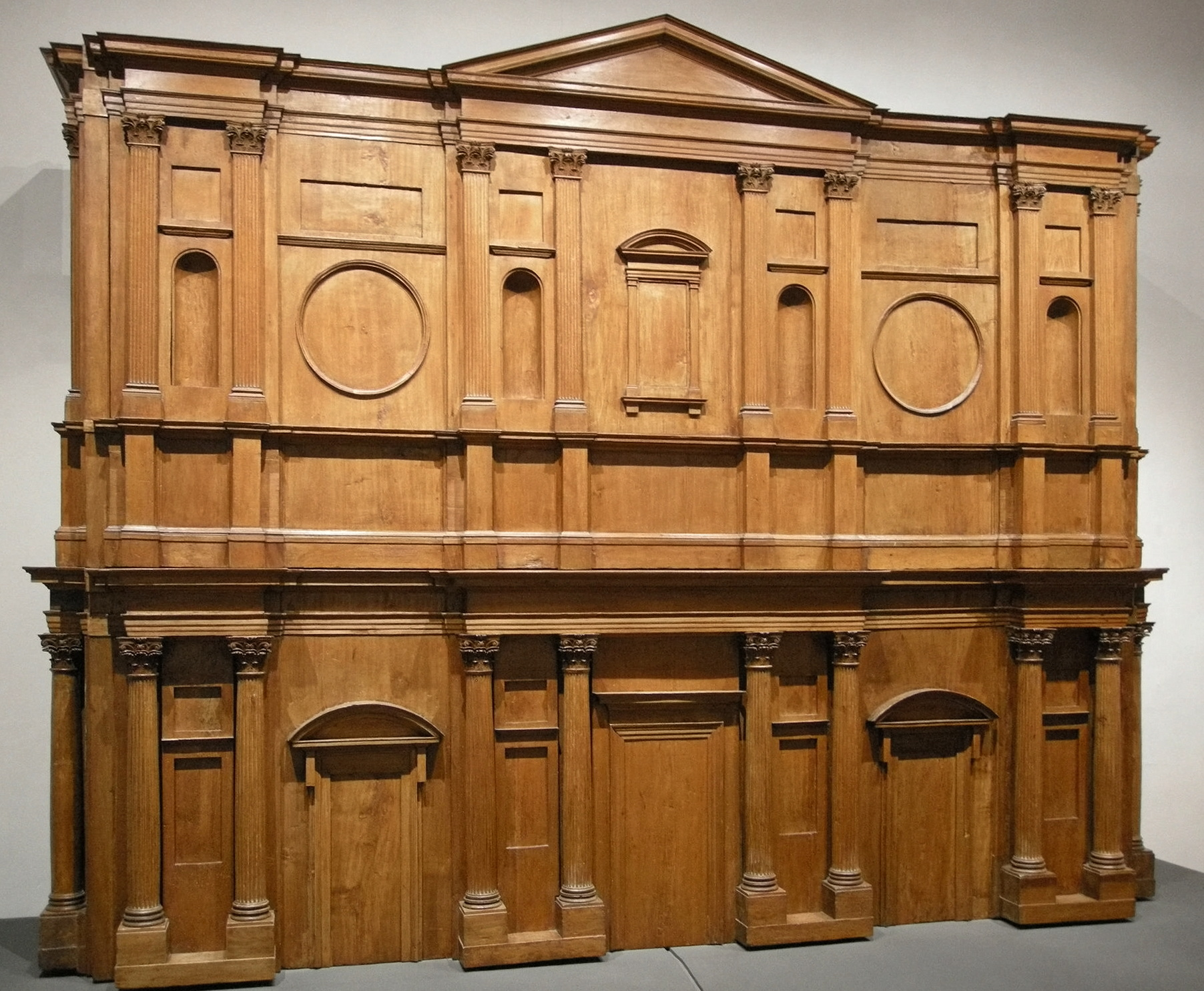
Model for San Lorenzo façade

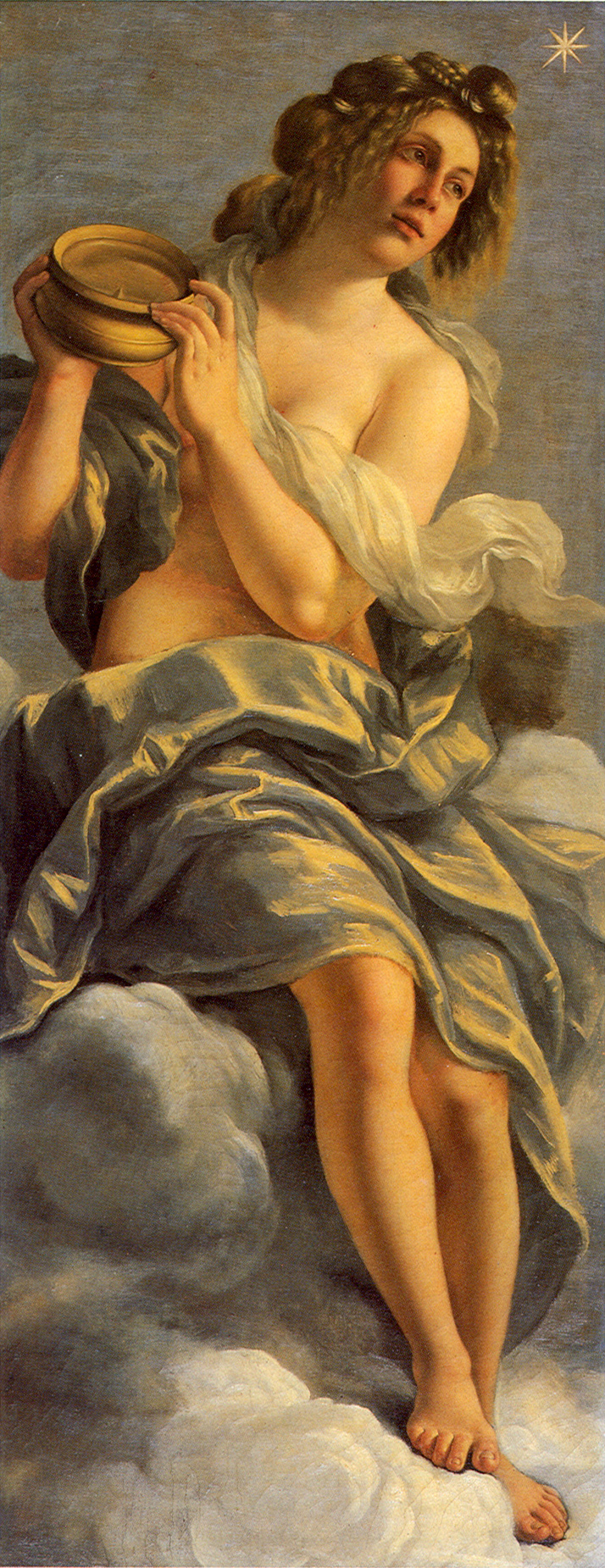
Allegory of Inclination
by Gentileschi

== See also ==
- List of single-artist museums
