= Crucifix (Núñez Delgado) =

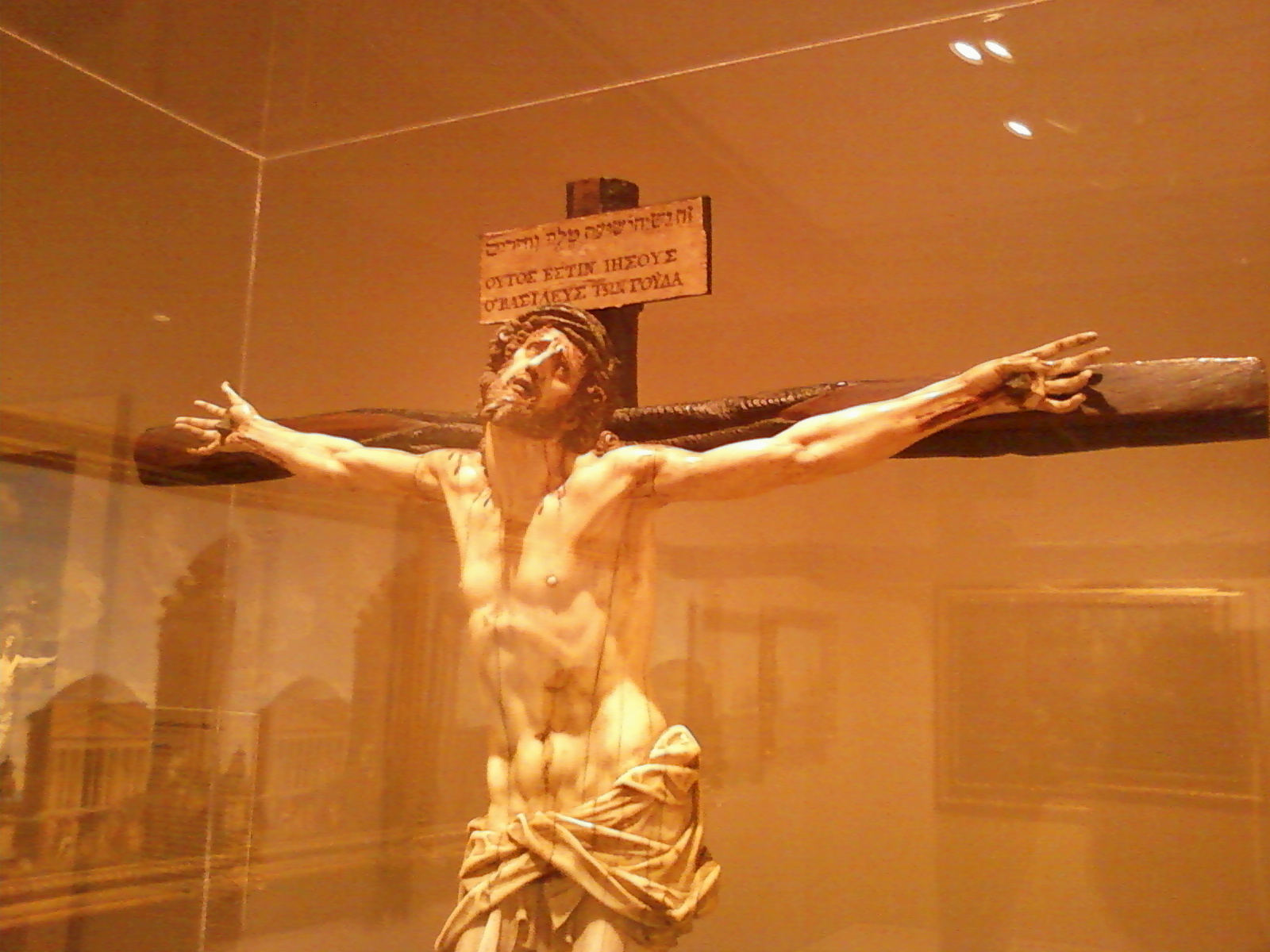
- Artist: Gaspar Núñez Delgado
- Year: 1599
- Type: Sculpture
- Dimensions: 67.9 cm × 8.3 cm × 36 cm (26.75 in × 3.25 in × 14 in)
- Location: Indianapolis Museum of Art, Indianapolis

The Crucifix by Spanish artist Gaspar Núñez Delgado, executed in 1599, and now in the Indianapolis Museum of Art, Indianapolis, Indiana. Made of ivory, ebony, mahogany, silver, and polychromy, it displays Núñez Delgado's mastery of human anatomy and human pain.

== Description ==
This crucifix, created at the turn of the century, marks a notable transition in Núñez Delgado's artistic style, from elegant Mannerism to the more robust Baroque style. Jesus's suffering is depicted with soul-searing intensity, making it a powerful devotional object. It is also quite costly: the cross is ebony inlaid with mahogany heartwood and the figure of Christ is carved from ivory. There are several splashes of color, in the red blood, brown hair, and green crown of thorns. The silver plaque below His feet is inscribed with the artist's name and year. The titulus reads "This is Jesus the King of the Jews" in Hebrew and Greek.

== Acquisition ==
The crucifix was acquired in 1995, by exchange with Walter E. and Tekla B. Wolf. It currently hangs in the William L. and Jane H. Fortune Gallery and has the accession number 1995.24.

== Artist ==
Gaspar Núñez Delgado was a Spanish sculptor active in Seville from 1576-1606. His style was heavily influenced by Jerónimo Hernández. He worked in primarily in wood, clay, and ivory. His masterpiece is the 1606 altarpiece of John the Baptist in the convent of San Clemente.

== See also ==
- Crucifix (Michelangelo)
