= Madonna of the Stairs =

Sculpture by Michelangelo

- Madonna della Scala (Italian)
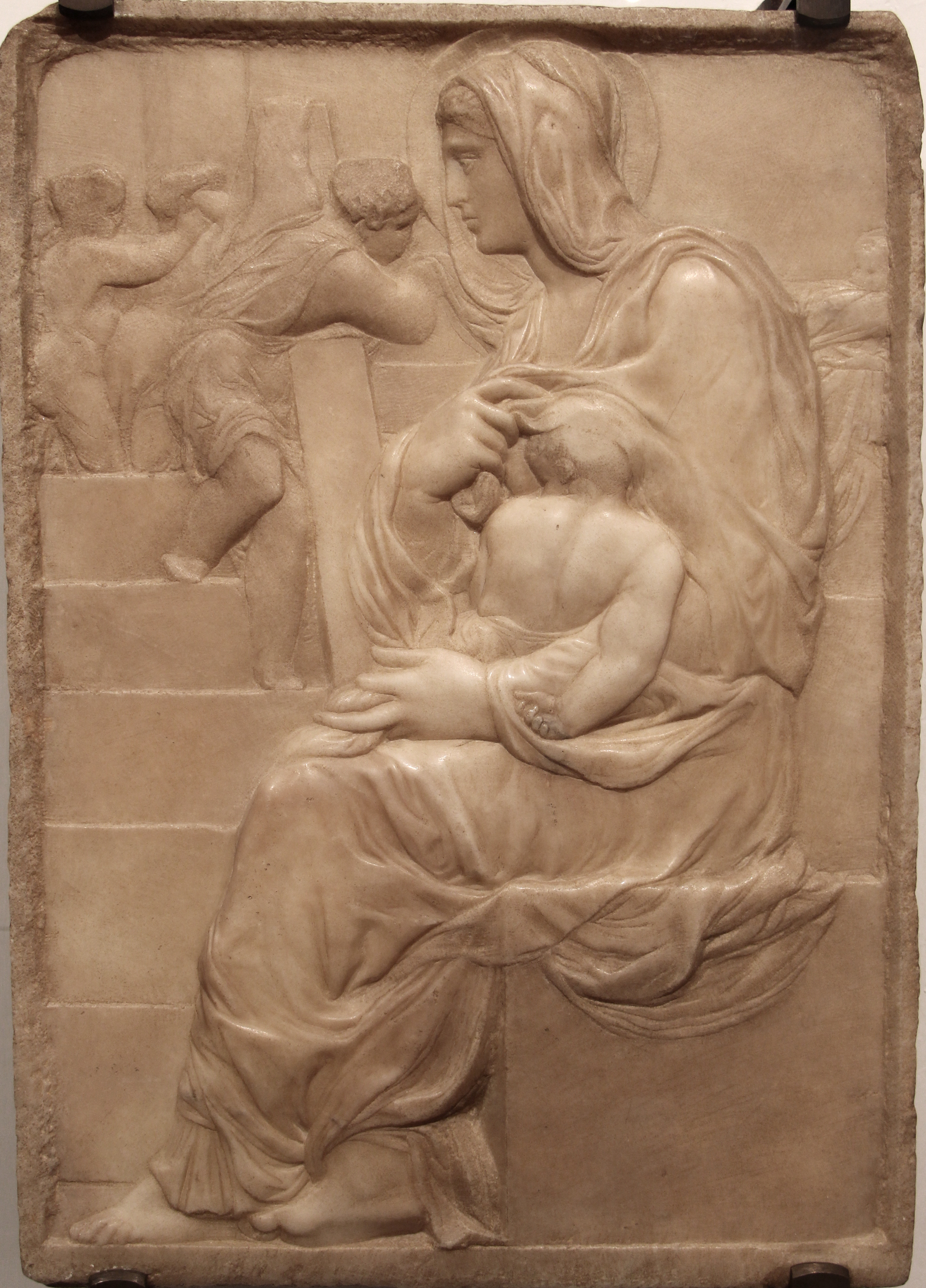
- Artist: Michelangelo
- Year: c. 1491
- Type: Marble
- Dimensions: 56.7 cm × 40.1 cm (22.3 in × 15.8 in)
- Location: Casa Buonarroti
- Preceded by: Head of a Faun
- Followed by: Battle of the Centaurs (Michelangelo)

The Madonna of the Stairs (or Madonna of the Steps) is a relief sculpture by Michelangelo in the Casa Buonarroti, Florence. It was sculpted around 1490, when Michelangelo was about fifteen. This and the Battle of the Centaurs were Michelangelo's first two sculptures. The first reference to the Madonna of the Stairs as a work by Michelangelo was in the 1568 edition of Giorgio Vasari's Lives of the Most Excellent Painters, Sculptors, and Architects.

The sculpture is exhibited at the Casa Buonarroti in Florence, Italy.

== Description ==
The work is an obvious homage to the stiacciato low reliefs of Donatello, as Vasari also noted, both in technique and sizes plans with millimeter thickness variations, both in iconography, starting from the scale pattern with pronounced steps and handrails foreshortened, visible for example in the Feast of Herod in Lille.

The figure of the Madonna, sitting on a square stone block, and in profile while looking away, occupies the entire height of the relief, from edge to edge, with a severity and monumentality reminiscent of classical reliefs. The composition of the sacred group is very original, at the same time blocked and dynamic, with the Virgin in a prophetic attitude, as she lifts her dress to feed or protect the child asleep, and generates a movement spiral thanks to the arrangement of opposite limbs. Jesus has let go of his arm behind his back and Mary comes to weave his feet, showing the right plant and breaking the stillness of the smooth surface of the bas-relief. The right hand of the Child turned out was later used more than once by the artist to symbolize the abandonment of the body in sleep or in death, as in the portrait of Lorenzo de 'Medici, Duke of Urbino or the Bandini Pietà and refers to the Farnese Hercules (since by Michelangelo man is seen as Hercules).

Pronounced is the muscle of the Child and the taking of Mary, especially with large hands, thanks to the different treatment of the surfaces, make it appear vigorous simple, everyday gesture. Virtuoso is finally the fall of the drapery, especially on Cubic's seat, which follows form with great realism.

On the left, on the steps that give the name to the work, there are two putti just blanks in attitude dance or fight and another who, leaning on the handrail, tents, along with a fourth figure placed behind the Virgin, a drape. It is difficult to determine the significance of this background scene, perhaps a simple exercise in style or a tribute to dancing putti Donatello.

== See also ==
- List of works by Michelangelo
- Medici Madonna
