= Crucifix (Michelangelo) =

Sculpture by Michelangelo

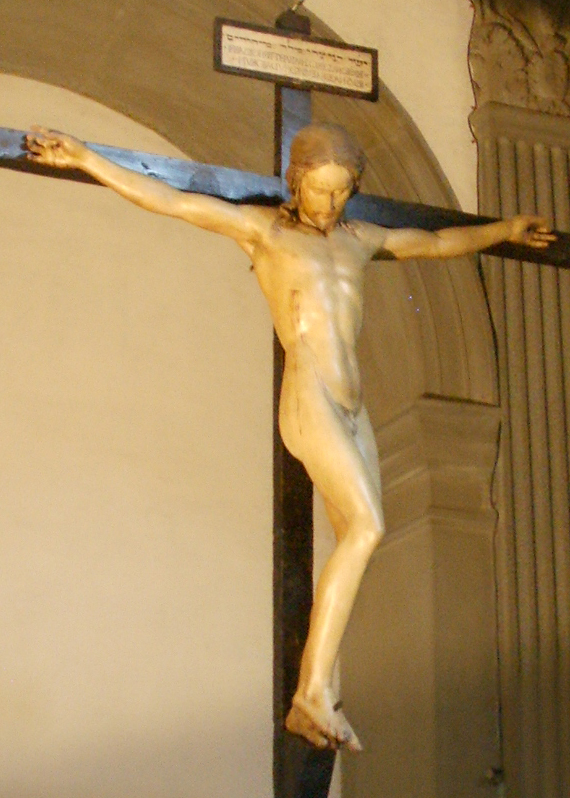
- Santo Spirito Crucifix
- Artist: Michelangelo
- Year: 1492
- Type: Polychrome wood
- Dimensions: 142 cm × 35 cm (55.9 in × 13.8 in)
- Location: Santo Spirito, Florence
- Preceded by: Battle of the Centaurs (Michelangelo)
- Followed by: St. Petronius (Michelangelo)

Two different crucifixes, or strictly, wooden corpus sculptures for crucifixes, are attributed to the High Renaissance master Michelangelo, although neither is universally accepted as his. Both are relatively small sculptures that would have been produced during Michelangelo's youth.

== Santo Spirito sculpture ==
One is a polychrome wood sculpture probably finished in 1493 that had been lost from view by scholars until it re-emerged in 1962. Usually the sculpture is entitled the Santo Spirito Crucifix to reflect its current location. Investigations in 2001 appear to confirm the attribution to Michelangelo and that the sculpture was made for the high altar of the Church of Santo Spirito di Firenze in Florence, Italy.

=== History ===
After the death of his protector, Lorenzo de' Medici, Michelangelo Buonarroti was a guest of the convent of Santa Maria del Santo Spirito in Florence when he was seventeen years old. There he was allowed to make anatomical studies of corpses coming from the convent hospital. In exchange for that opportunity, he is said to have sculpted the wooden crucifix that was placed over the high altar. After an undocumented date the sculpture was moved for display in the convent.

In 1962, Santo Spirito Crucifix was put on display at the museum in Florence that is dedicated to the works of Michelangelo and the history of his family, Casa Buonarroti, and the investigations into its authenticity ensued that confirmed the attribution to Michelangelo in 2001, determining that the sculpture might have been executed as early as 1492.

Today the crucifix is hung in the octagonal sacristy of the Basilica of Santa Maria del Santo Spirito.

=== Description ===
The work is especially notable for the fact that Christ is completely naked. The nudity of the figure is true to the Gospels. They assert that the removal of Christ's clothing by the Roman soldiers is the fulfilment of an Old Testament prophecy in Psalm 22:18, "They part my garments among them, and cast lots upon my vesture." All of the gospel writers suggest the nakedness, while John supplies the details:

Then the soldiers, when they had crucified Jesus, took his garments, and made four parts, to every soldier a part; and also his coat: now the coat was without seam, woven from the top throughout. They said therefore among themselves, Let us not rend it, but cast lots for it, whose it shall be: that the scripture might be fulfilled, which saith, 'They parted my raiment among them, and for my vesture they did cast lots.' These things therefore the soldiers did.

The sign attached to the cross includes a disparaging epithet the gospel writers report was attached above him to mock Jesus. It is inscribed in Hebrew, Greek, and Latin. The wording translates as, "Jesus of Nazareth King of the Jews". Although it varies slightly among them, all of the evangelists record this inscription. Here the artist favored the rendering from John's Gospel (John 19:19).

Also present in the sculpture is a spear wound recorded similarly as inflicted into the side of Jesus by a Roman soldier. His blood is depicted dripping from the wound on his right side.

== Bargello sculpture ==
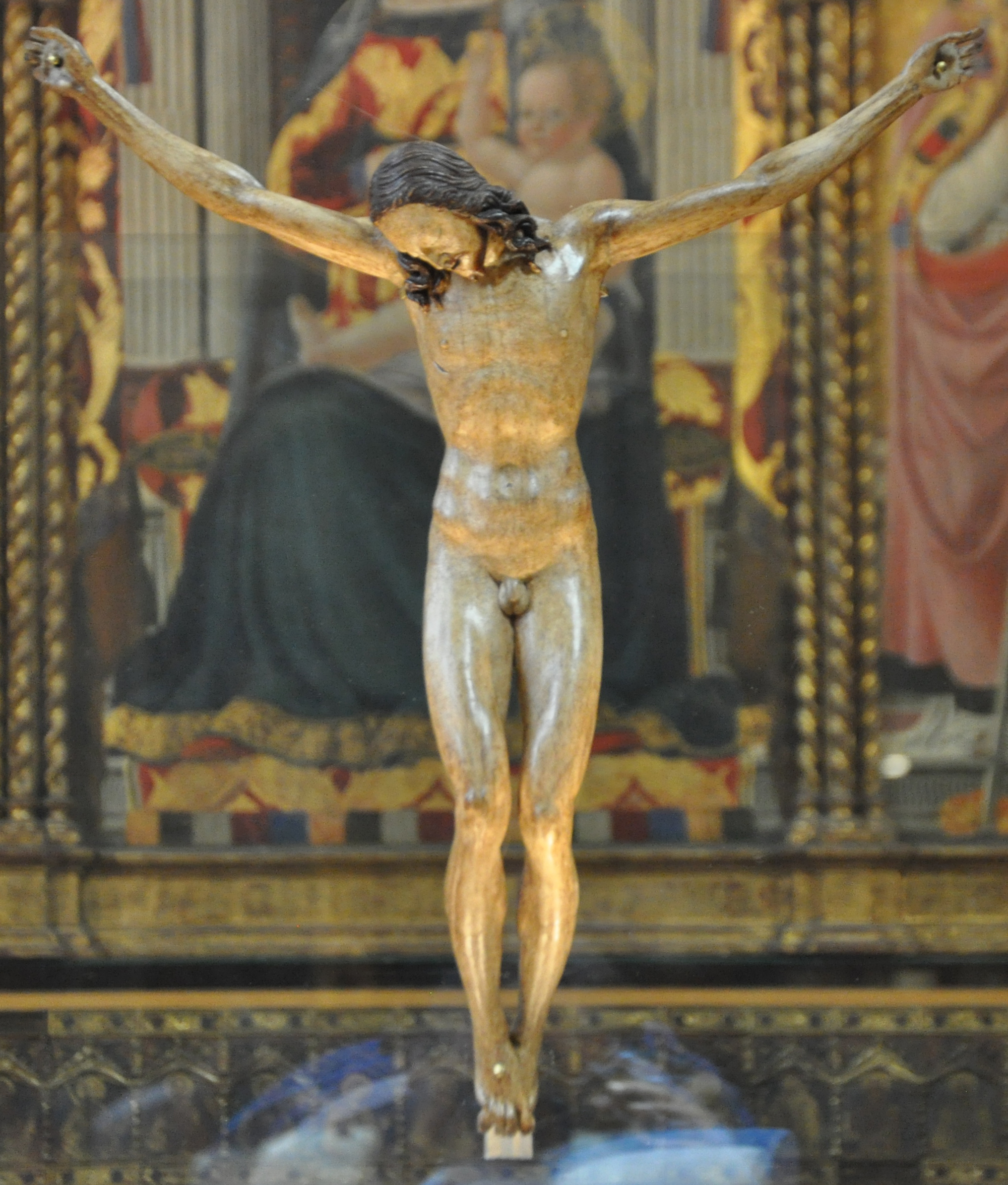
Crucifix Gallino is a sculpture displayed at the Bargello in Florence

In December 2008, the Italian government acquired another polychrome corpus sculpture for a crucifix in limewood from the antique dealer Giancarlo Gallino for €3.2 million, that is less than half the size of the Santo Spirito sculpture. It measures 41.3 by 39.7 centimetres (16.3 in × 15.6 in). The sculpture is entitled, Crucifix Gallino and is displayed at Bargello, a national art museum in Florence. In 2004, this smaller sculpture had been exhibited in the Museo Horne in Florence.

Since this sculpture is not documented by the contemporary biographers of Michelangelo, Ascanio Condivi and Giorgio Vasari, some art historians have attributed the work to Michelangelo based only on stylistic criteria and they have dated its creation to around 1495.

== Debates of authenticity ==
There have been academic debates regarding the authenticity of these two sculptures now attributed to Michelangelo.

In December 2009, an inquiry was opened into the acquisition of the Bargello crucifix by the Italian state. A journal, Agenzia Nazionale Stampa Associata (ANSA) reports that "several experts have cast doubts on the attribution, with the doyenne of Michelangelo cross studies, German art historian Margrit Lisner, saying it was probably a Sansovino" sculpture.

In a book published by the Leipzig University Press in 2019, the Milanese art historian Antonio Forcellino identifies the Michelangelo crucifix of Santo Spirito as a privately owned wooden sculpture. He attributes this work to Michelangelo not only because of its display of anatomical detail, but also, and primarily, because of an epigraph that was inscribed on the back of the work at the beginning of the eighteenth century.

== See also ==
- List of statues of Jesus
- List of works by Michelangelo
