= Diana and Cupid =

Painting by Pompeo Batoni

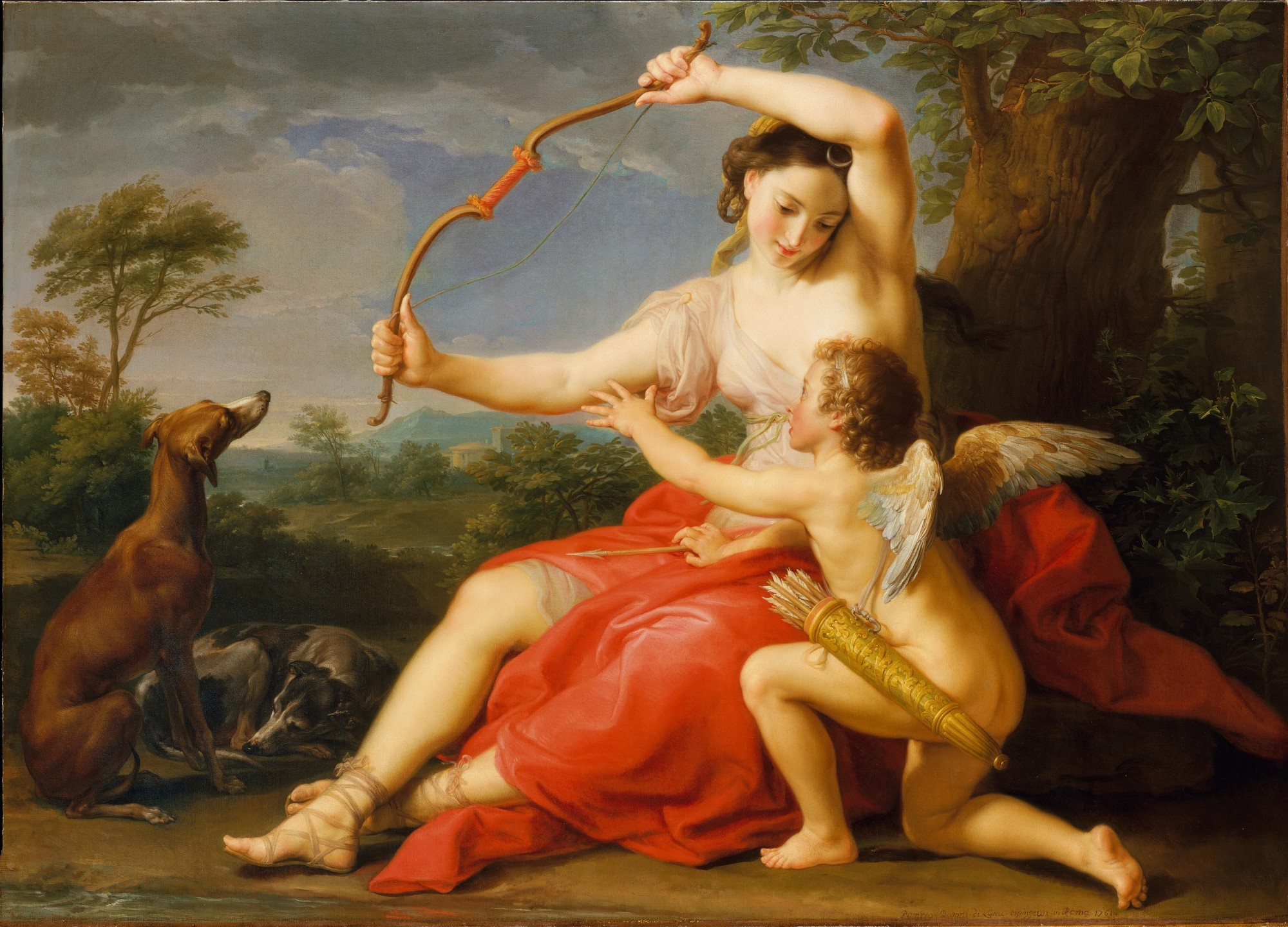
- Artist: Pompeo Batoni
- Year: 1761
- Medium: Oil on canvas
- Dimensions: 124.5 cm × 172.7 cm (49.0 in × 68.0 in)
- Location: Metropolitan Museum of Art, New York

Diana and Cupid is an oil painting by the Italian artist Pompeo Batoni, painted in 1761, and it is now in the Metropolitan Museum of Art in New York.

== Description ==
Sir Humphrey Morice, a businessman and the then Governor of the Bank of England, purchased the work from Batoni on April 1, 1762. Morice, an animal lover, commissioned Batoni to portray an allegory of himself resting on the Roman countryside in a form of a dog and mythical figures of Greek god and goddess namely Cupid and Diana respectively. The allegory illustrates where Diana snatches the bow of Cupid in order to make him rest for a while. The portraiture of Diana is based from a sleeping statue of Ariadne in the Vatican City. The painting is a counterpart for Anton Raphael Mengs Neoclassical type paintings.

Its dimensions are 124.5 by 172.7 cm (49.0 by 68.0 in).
