= Sagrestia Nuova =

Chapel in San Lorenzo, Florence, Italy

New Sacristy
- Sagrestia Nuova
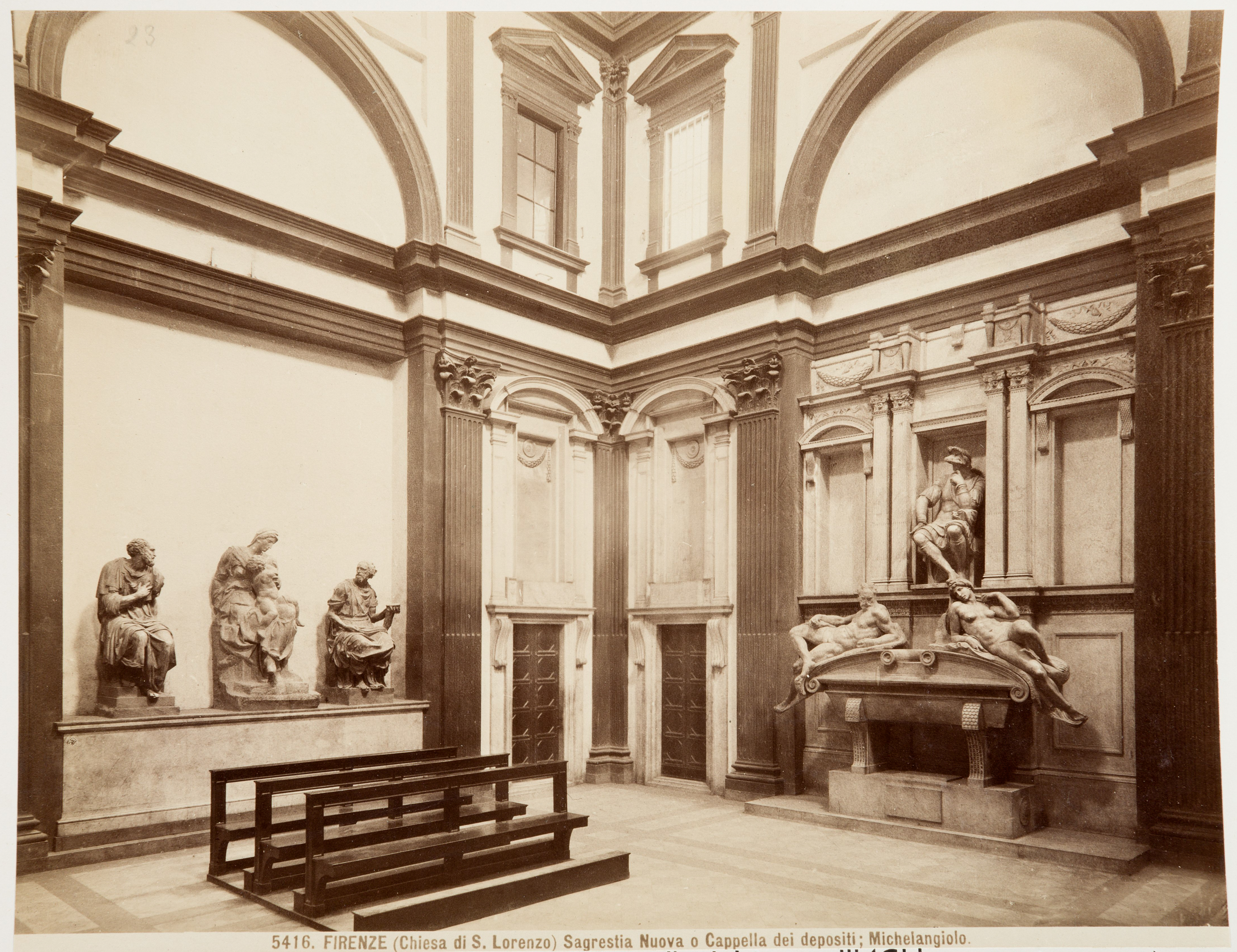
- Albumen print by Giacomo Brogi (c. 1870s) from a travel album

Location
- Location: Basilica of San Lorenzo, Florence, Italy
- Interactive map of New Sacristy
- Coordinates: 43°46′30″N 11°15′13″E

Architecture
- Type: Sacristy, sepulchre, memorial, monument
- Style: High Renaissance
- Established: 1520
- Completed: 1533

The Sagrestia Nuova, also known as the New Sacristy and the Medici Chapel, is a mausoleum that stands as a testament to the grandeur and artistic vision of the Medici family. Constructed in 1520, the mausoleum was designed by the Italian artist and architect Michelangelo. Situated adjacent to the Basilica di San Lorenzo in Florence, Italy, the Sagrestia Nuova forms an integral part of the museum complex known as the Medici Chapels.

== History ==
=== Background ===
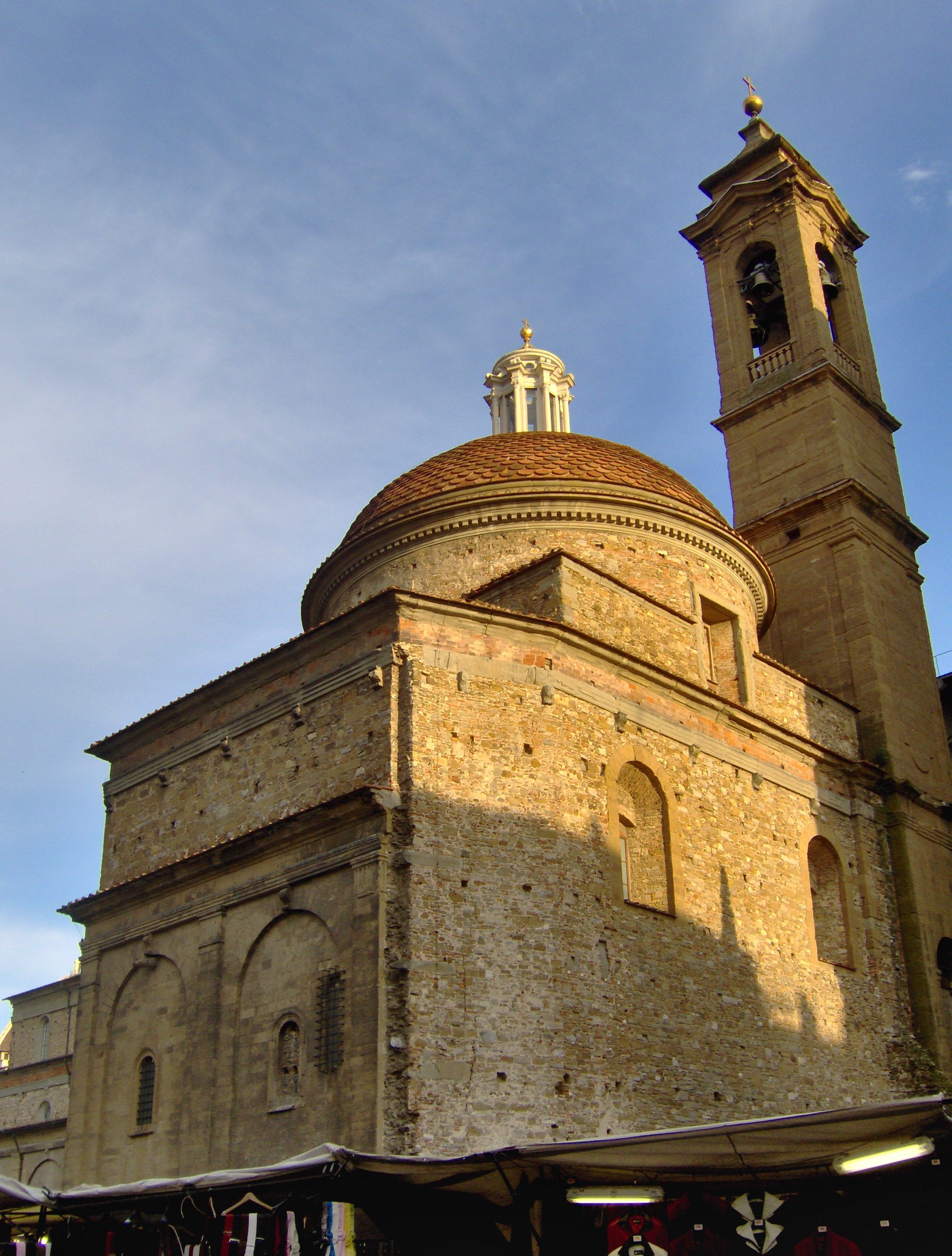
Exterior view

The death of two scions of the Medici family, Giuliano de' Medici, Duke of Nemours (in 1516), and Lorenzo de' Medici, Duke of Urbino (in 1519), had deeply embittered Pope Leo X, the brother of Giuliano and uncle of Lorenzo, who wanted to ensure that they obtained a princely burial. It was also suggested by their cousin Cardinal Giulio de' Medici (later Pope Clement VII), commissioning Michelangelo's project for the façade for Basilica di San Lorenzo, engaging the artist in a new project for the basilica. The church had been the burial place of the Medici family for a century, but at the time there were no spaces available in which to create a new monumental complex: the historic family chapel, the Old Sacristy, designed by Filippo Brunelleschi and Donatello, was a composition of sober and measured balance, to which no other decoration could be added without compromising the whole. The crypt, where some family members are buried, did not satisfy the clients' wishes for splendor and celebration. Not even for Lorenzo de' Medici and his brother Giuliano de' Medici had a worthy burial been prepared. There was a need to create a new environment as a resting place for the two "dukes" (or "captains") and the two "magnificents".

=== Design ===
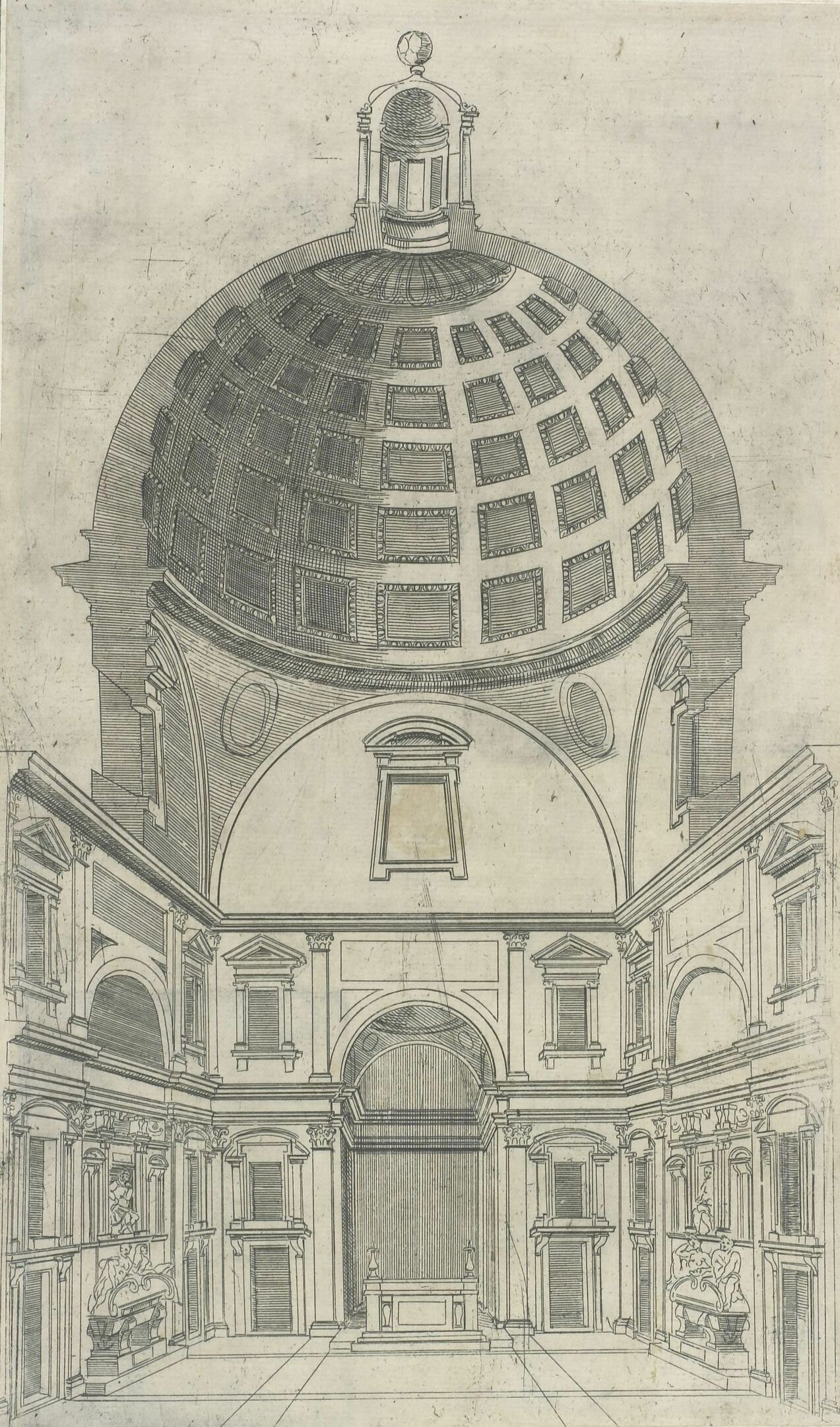
Section of the Sagrestia Nuova, looking towards the altar

Michelangelo was chosen for the construction, allowing him to recover from the impasse on the façade project, the contract for which was definitively terminated in March 1520. The exact contracting document for the Medici Chapel is not known, but from other documents and letters it is clear that in March work on a new chapel had been started.

During the design phase, Michelangelo thought of various solutions before choosing the version implemented. The question was how to arrange the four sepulchres in relation to the available space, with the altar and the entrance. The first idea was for tombs placed at the corners leaning against the walls (March 1520), but on 23 October 1520 Michelangelo presented Cardinal Giulio with a project with an aedicula in the center containing the tombs. A drawing was provided on 21 December 1520. The artist therefore abandoned the scheme of the tombs in the center, opting to arrange them against the walls and studying variants with single or double burials, until he arrived at a defined project with single tombs for the dukes in the side walls and double ones for the magnificents on the wall opposite the altar. Only those of the dukes were finally completed. In 1521 Pope Leo died and work was interrupted.

=== Second stage ===
With the election of Clement VII in 1523, in December of that year the artist returned to the works at San Lorenzo. It was thought to house the tombs of Pope Leo and, at the time, of Clement VII in the Sacristy, but the idea was soon abandoned in favor of the choir of San Lorenzo. In the end, however, both were buried in Santa Maria sopra Minerva in Rome.

In the spring of 1524, Michelangelo was working on the clay models for the sculptures and in the autumn the marbles arrived from Carrara. Between 1525 and 1527 at least four statues were completed (including the Night and the Dawn) and four others were already defined with the models.

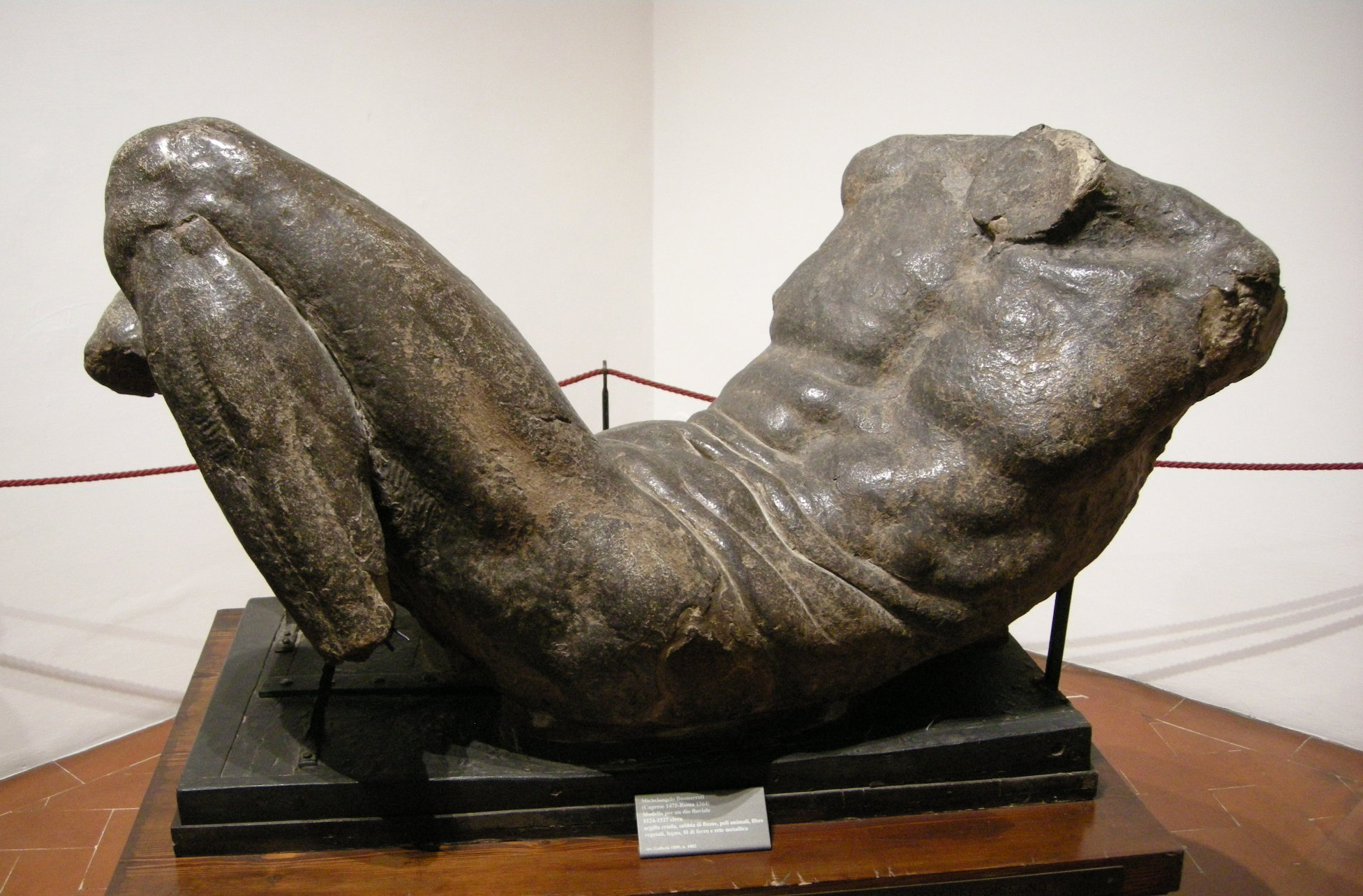
River God, Accademia delle Arti del Disegno, Florence

In 1526, the first tomb was walled up, that of Lorenzo de' Medici, Duke of Urbino. On 17 June, the artist sent a letter to Rome in which he wrote: "I work as hard as I can, and in fifteen days I'll get the other captain started, then I'll be left, of matters of importance, only and four figures. The four figures on the cassoni, the four figures on the ground, which are Rivers, and two captains and Our Lady going to the tomb at the head, are the figures I would like to make with my own hand: and of these there are six begun, and the courage is enough for me to do them in the right time and partly do the others that don't matter so much". It is therefore understood that in addition to the extant sculptures, four river allegories were also envisaged (the rivers of Hades, or perhaps the rivers under Medici rule) lying at the foot of the tombs; the only surviving work that relates to these is the model of the River God in the collection of the Casa Buonarroti (since 2018 in the Accademia delle Arti del Disegno in Florence.

=== Interrupting and resuming jobs ===
With the heavy blow received by Pope Clement during the Sack of Rome in 1527, the city of Florence rebelled against the Medici rule, driving out the little loved duke Alessandro de' Medici. Michelangelo, despite being linked to the Medici by working relationships since his youth, blatantly sided with the republican faction, actively participating, as person in charge of the fortifications, in the defense measures against the siege of the city in 1529–1530. When the Florentines were defeated Michelangelo fled the city, but was declared a rebel and presented himself voluntarily to avoid more serious punitive measures. Clement VII's pardon was not long in coming, provided that the artist immediately resume work in San Lorenzo where, in addition to the Sacristy, the project for a monumental Laurentian Library had been added five years earlier. It is clear how the pope was moved by the awareness of his not being able to renounce the only artist capable of giving shape to the dreams of glory of his dynasty, despite his ingratitude towards and betrayal of the Medici.

In April 1531, work resumed on the Sacristy and by the summer two more statues had to be completed and a third started. It is also known that the Portrait of Lorenzo de' Medici, Duke of Urbino, was executed between 1531 and 1534, while the Portrait of Giuliano de' Medici, Duke of Nemours, was given to Giovanni Angelo Montorsoli in 1533 for finishing. In that same period the artist was preparing two allegorical statues, the Heaven and the Earth, which were to have been sculpted by Niccolò Tribolo and placed in the niches on the sides of Giuliano's tomb; these however remained empty. Two more evidently had to be planned for the tomb of Lorenzo.

The Florentine works by now proceeded ever more slowly because in those same years Michelangelo was also working, in addition to the library, on the tomb of Julius II, for which he was preparing the Slaves. Michelangelo, not happy with the city's political climate, took the opportunity to take new assignments in Rome and left Florence, in 1534, never setting foot there again.

In 1559, on the initiative of Cosimo I de' Medici, the chapel was arranged according to the project by Giorgio Vasari. Although an entire wall with the tomb of the "Magnificent" was missing and the river deities, statues, stuccoes and frescoes required by the contract had yet to be created, the Sacristy was considered completed.

== Architecture ==
=== Lantern ===
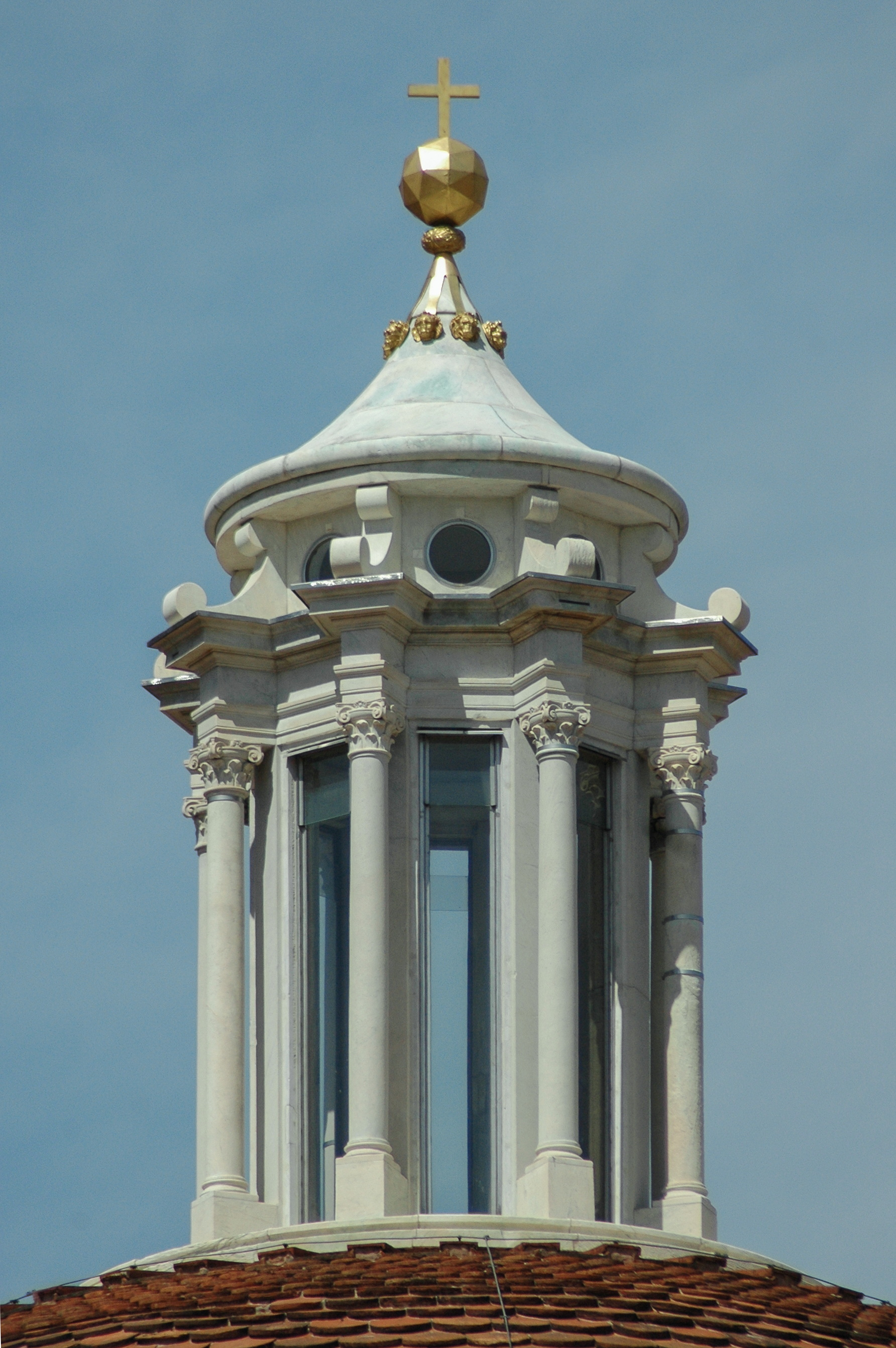
The lantern

The lantern at the top of the dome is made out of marble and has an "...unusual polyhedron mounted on the peak of the conical roof".

The lantern holding up the orb helps to accentuate the height and size of the chapel, which is fairly small. The lantern is slightly less than seven meters tall and "...is equal to the height of the dome it surmounts". The lantern metaphorically expresses the themes of death and resurrection; it is where the soul could escape and go from "...death to the afterlife".

== Sculptures ==
=== Side tombs ===
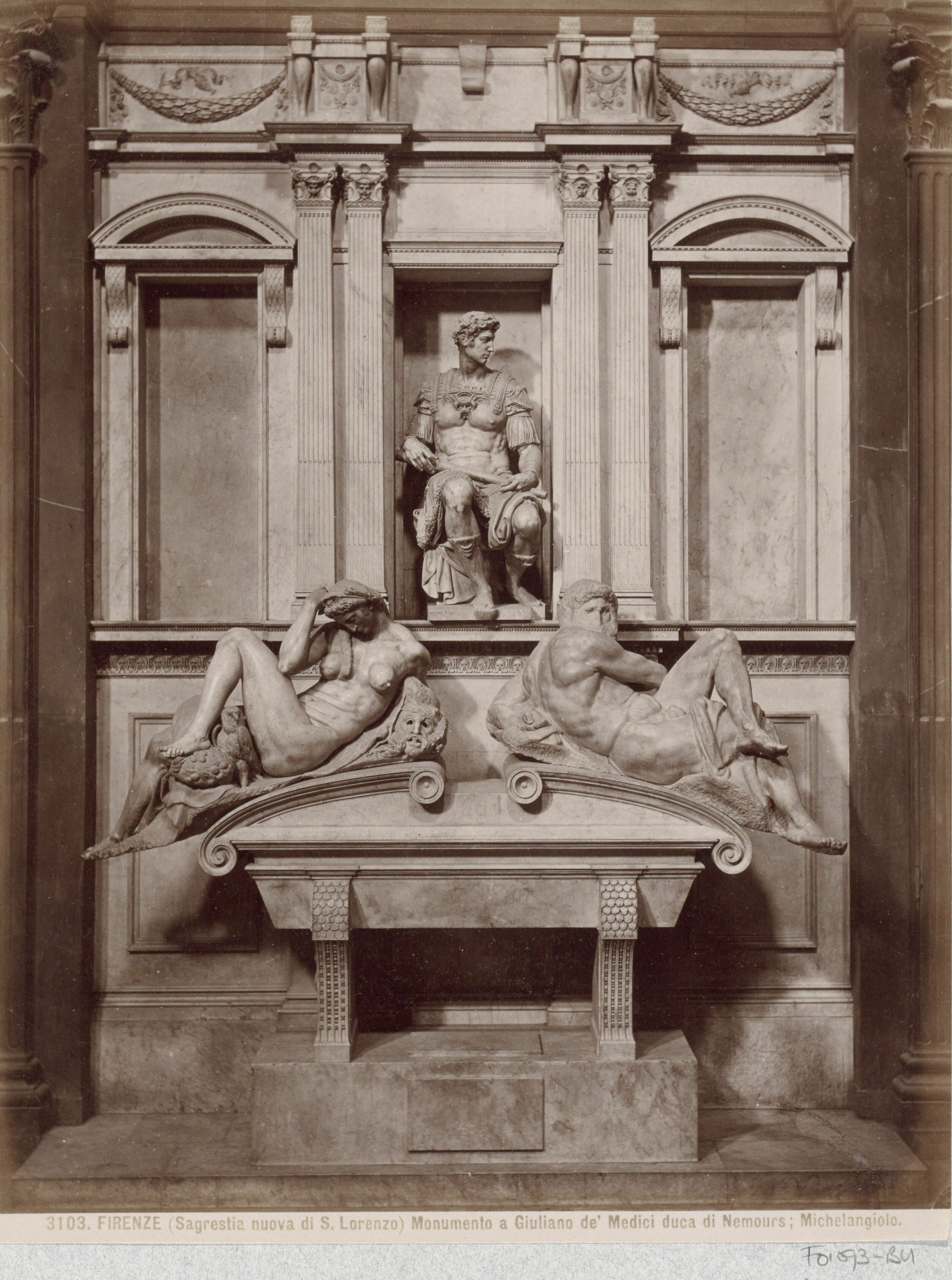
Tomb of Giuliano de' Medici,
with Night and Day

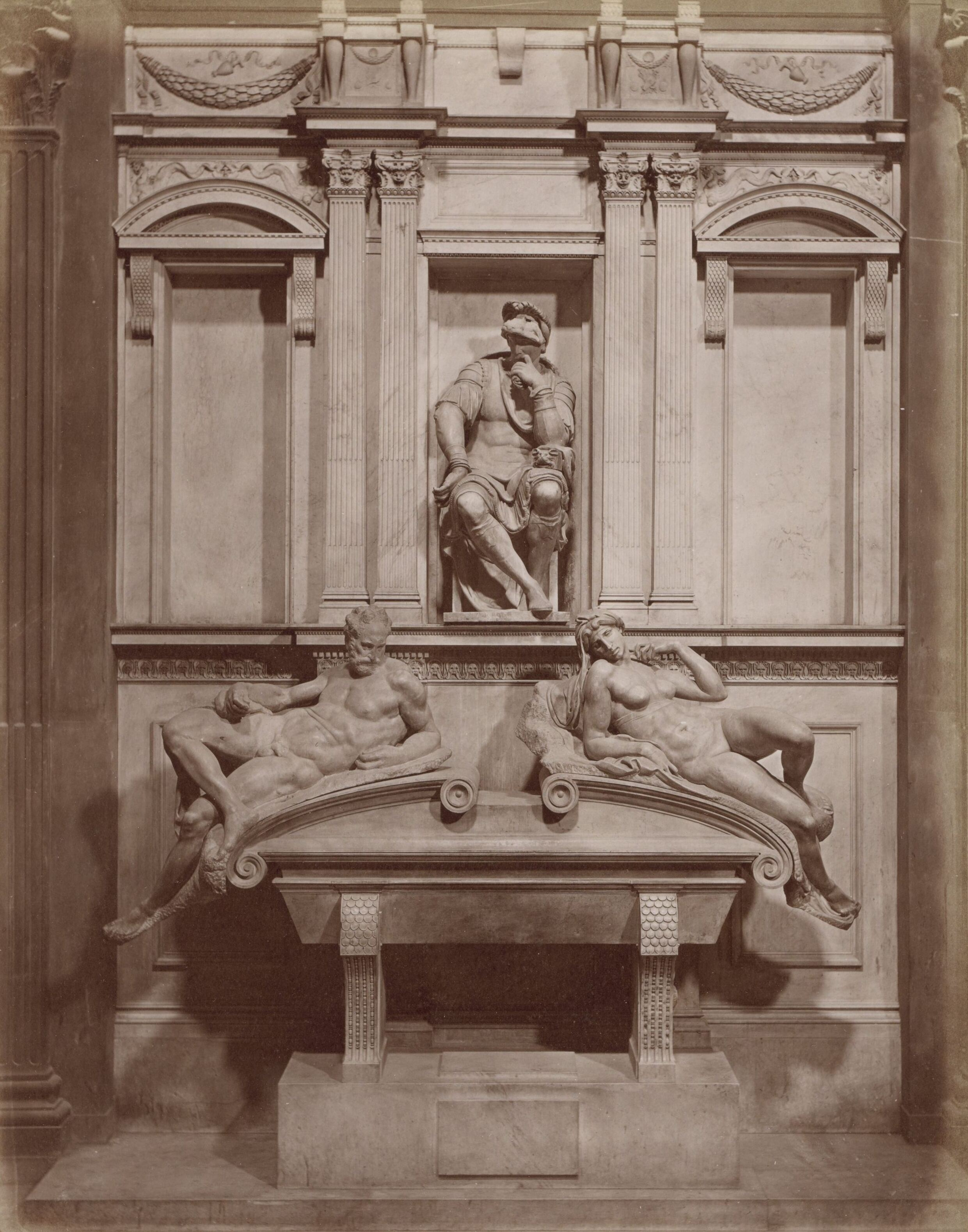
Tomb of Lorenzo de' Medici,
with Dusk and Dawn

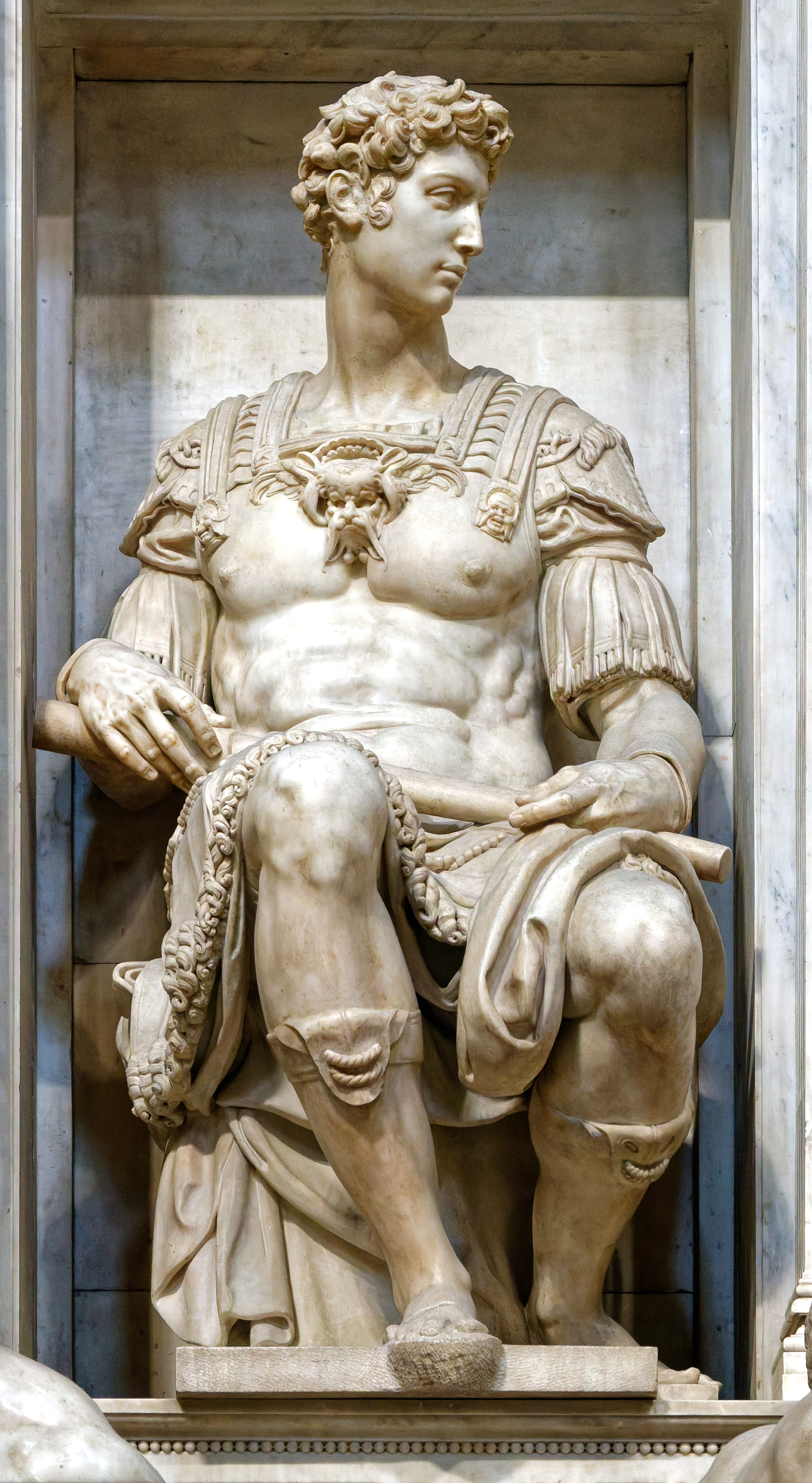
Portrait of Giuliano de' Medici, Duke of Nemours (1479–1516)

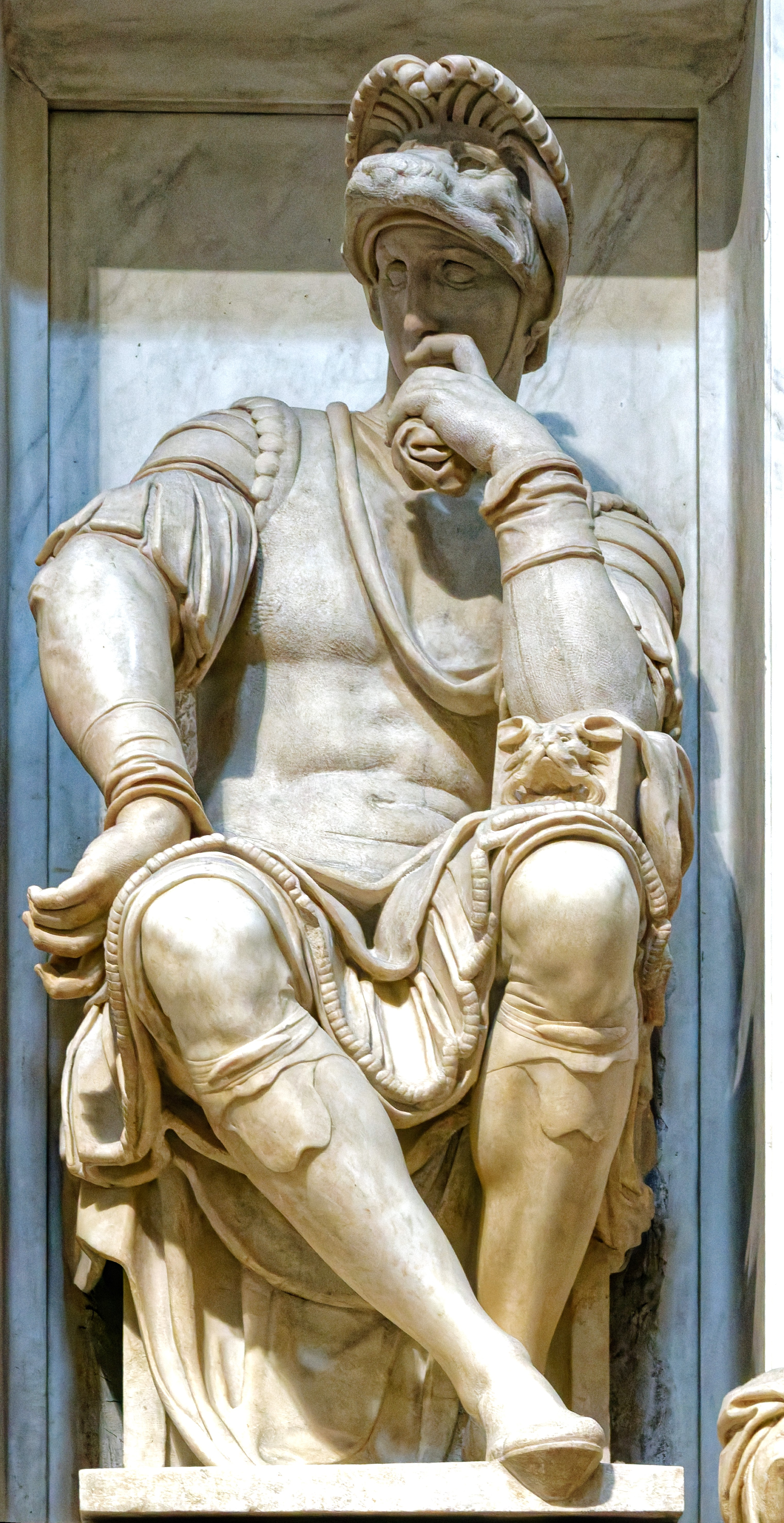
Portrait of Lorenzo de' Medici, Duke of Urbino (–1519)

Embedded in the two side walls are the monumental tombs of Giuliano de' Medici, Duke of Nemours, and Lorenzo de' Medici, Duke of Urbino. Initially up to five sculptures per tomb were to be carved, but the number was ultimately reduced to three. For the funerary monuments on both sides of the chapel, Michelangelo created the Allegories of Time, which symbolize the triumph of the Medici family over the passage of time. The four Allegories are placed above the sepulchres, at the feet of the dukes. The elliptical line on which they rest is an invention by Michelangelo that anticipates the curves of the Baroque, as in the staircase of the Laurentian Library. For the tomb of Giuliano de' Medici, he chose the Day and the Night for that of Lorenzo the Dusk (or Twilight) and the Dawn. The four Rivers, never executed, were also intended to recall the permanent and unstoppable flow of time.

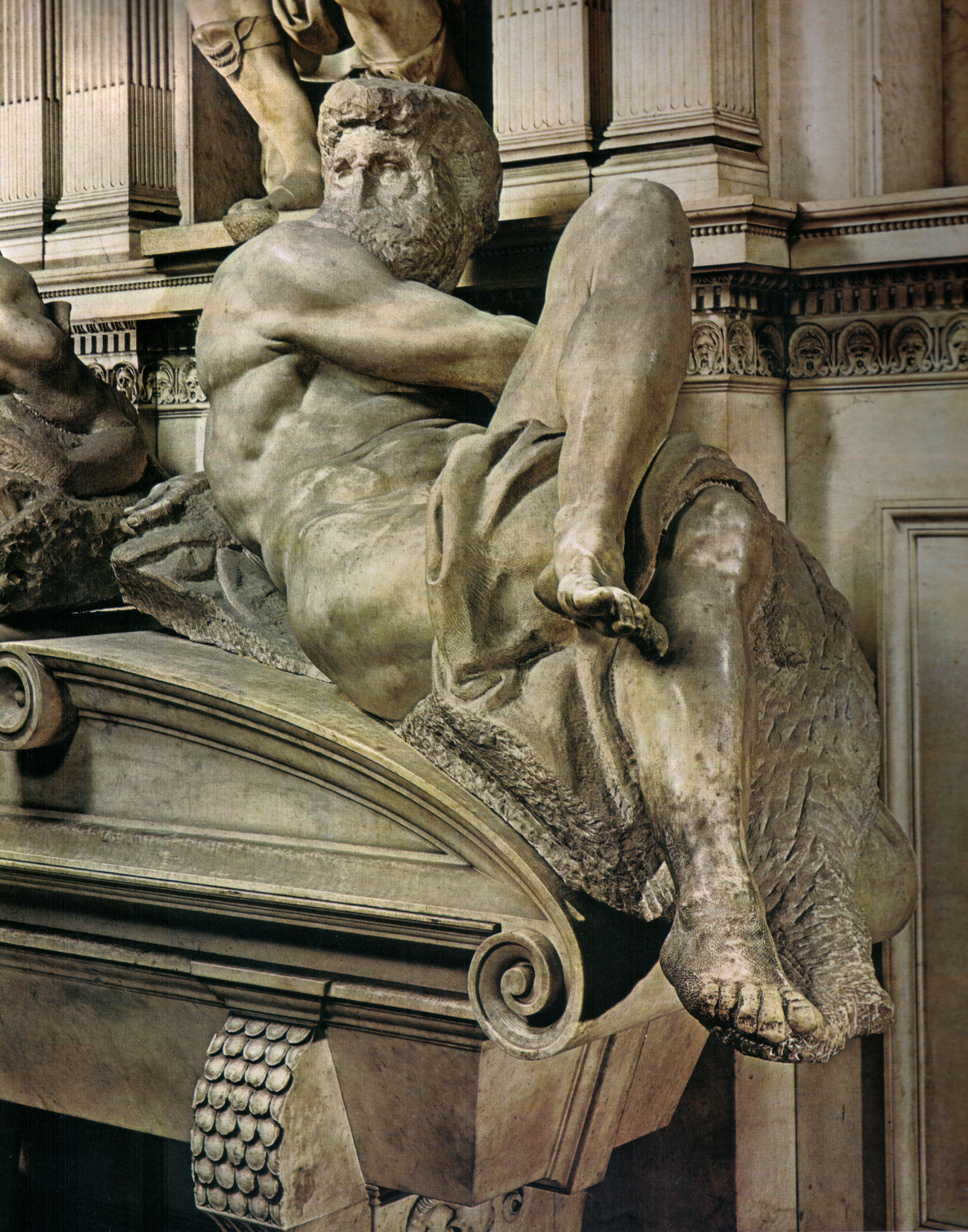
Day

All the Allegories are characterized by stretching and twisting and appear "unfinished" in some parts. Particularly beautiful are the emblematic position of the Day, turned from the back which shows only the mysterious expression of the eyes in a barely sketched face, or the body of the Night which perfectly represents abandonment during sleep. In the Renaissance, especially in environments influenced by the Florentine Neoplatonism of Marsilio Ficino, the Night rediscovers its attributes of Primordial Mother and is associated with the figure of Leda. The position of the goddess, with her head bowed, expresses the kinship of the Night with the melancholic temperament. The owl and the poppies are symbols of Death and Sleep, the twin sons of Night. According to the doctrines of Orphism and Pythagoreanism, Leda and the Night are the personification of a double theory of death, according to which joy and pain coincide.

As for the portraits of the dukes, Michelangelo sculpted them seated in two niches above their respective tombs, facing each other, both dressed as Roman leaders. These sculptures, with attention to the smallest details, are idealized and do not reproduce real features, but nonetheless have a strong psychological character (Giuliano sitting in a proud posture with the baton of command is more haughtier and decisive, while Lorenzo, in a thoughtful pose, is more melancholic and meditative). A popular tradition tells that someone criticized the lack of resemblance of the portrait to the true features of Giuliano; Michelangelo, aware that his work would be handed down over time, replied that in ten centuries no one would be able to notice. Giuliano personifies active life, one of the two roads that lead to God. His scepter alludes to royal power, characteristic of those born under the sign of Jupiter. The coins are a symbol of magnanimity and indicate that the active man loves to "expend" himself in action. Lorenzo, known by the name "pensive", represents the contemplative attitude. The shadowed face recalls the facies nigra of Saturn, protector of melancholics. The forefinger on the mouth traces the saturnine motif of silence. The reclining arm is an iconographic tope of the melancholy mood. The closed casket resting on a leg is an allusion to parsimony, a typical quality of saturnine temperaments.

In a statement in the biography of Michelangelo that was published in 1553 by his disciple, Ascanio Condivi, and largely was based on Michelangelo's own recollections, Condivi gives the following description of the sculptures on the two Medici tombs: "The statues are four in number, placed in a sacristy... the sarcophagi are placed before the side walls, and on the lids of each there recline two big figures, larger than life, to wit, a man and a woman; they signify Day and Night and, in conjunction, Time which devours all things… And in order to signify Time he planned to make a mouse, having left a bit of marble upon the work (which [plan] he subsequently did not carry out because he was prevented by circumstances), because this little animal ceaselessly gnaws and consumes just as time devours everything”.

==== Night ====
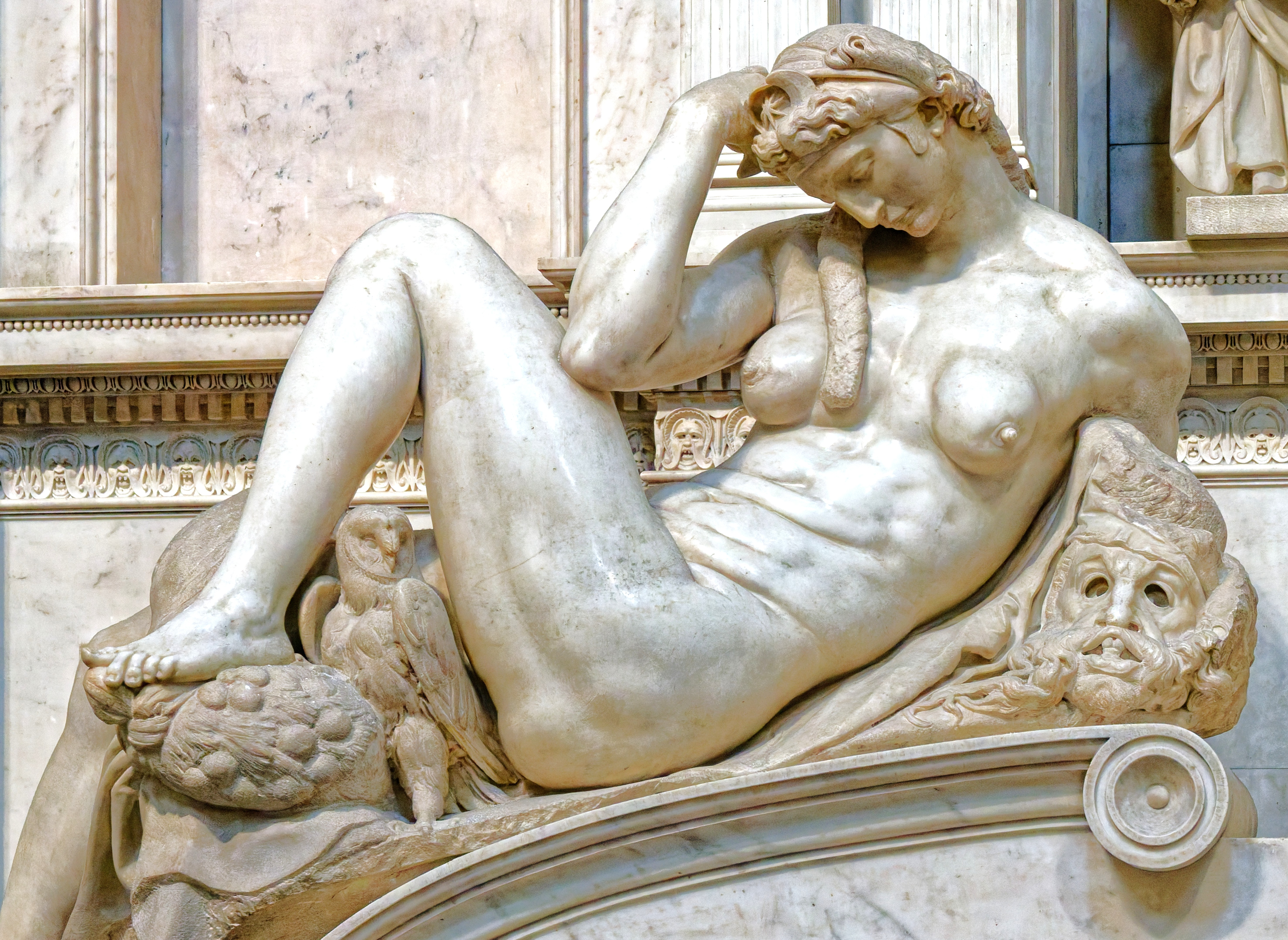
Night

Night is a sculpture in marble (155x150 cm, maximum length 194 cm diagonally) by Michelangelo. Dating from 1526 to 1531, it is part of the decoration of the New Sacristy and part of an allegory of the four parts of a day. It is situated on the left of the sarcophagus of the tomb of Giuliano di Lorenzo de' Medici, Duke of Nemours.

Along with his Dawn, Michelangelo drew from the ancient Sleeping Ariadne for his sculpture's pose.

In his poem "L'Idéal" from Les Fleurs du Mal, French Romantic poet Charles Baudelaire references the statue:

Ou bien toi, grande Nuit, fille de Michel-Ange,
Qui tors paisiblement dans une pose étrange
Tes appas façonnés aux bouches des Titans!

Or you, great Night, daughter of Michelangelo,
Who calmly contort, reclining in a strange pose
Your charms molded by the mouths of Titans!

In his Life of Michelangelo, Giorgio Vasari quotes an epigram by Giovanni Strozzi, written, perhaps in 1544, in praise of Michelangelo's Night:

La Notte che tu vedi in sì dolci atti
dormire, fu da un Angelo scolpita
in questo sasso e, perché dorme, ha vita:
destala, se nol credi, e parleratti.

Night, whom you see sleeping in such sweet attitudes
was carved in this stone by an Angel
and although she sleeps, she has life:
wake her, if you don't believe it, and she will speak to you.

Michelangelo responded in 1545–46 with another epigram, entitled "Risposta del Buonarroto" (Buonarroto's response). Speaking in the voice of the statue, it may contain a scathing critique of Cosimo I de' Medici's governance, according to Kenneth Gross:

Caro m'è 'l sonno, e più l'esser di sasso,
mentre che 'l danno e la vergogna dura;
non veder, non sentir m'è gran ventura;
però non mi destar, deh, parla basso.
My sleep is dear to me, and more dear this being of stone,
as long as the agony and shame last.
Not to see, not to hear [or feel] is for me the best fortune.;
So do not wake me! Speak softly.

==== Dawn ====
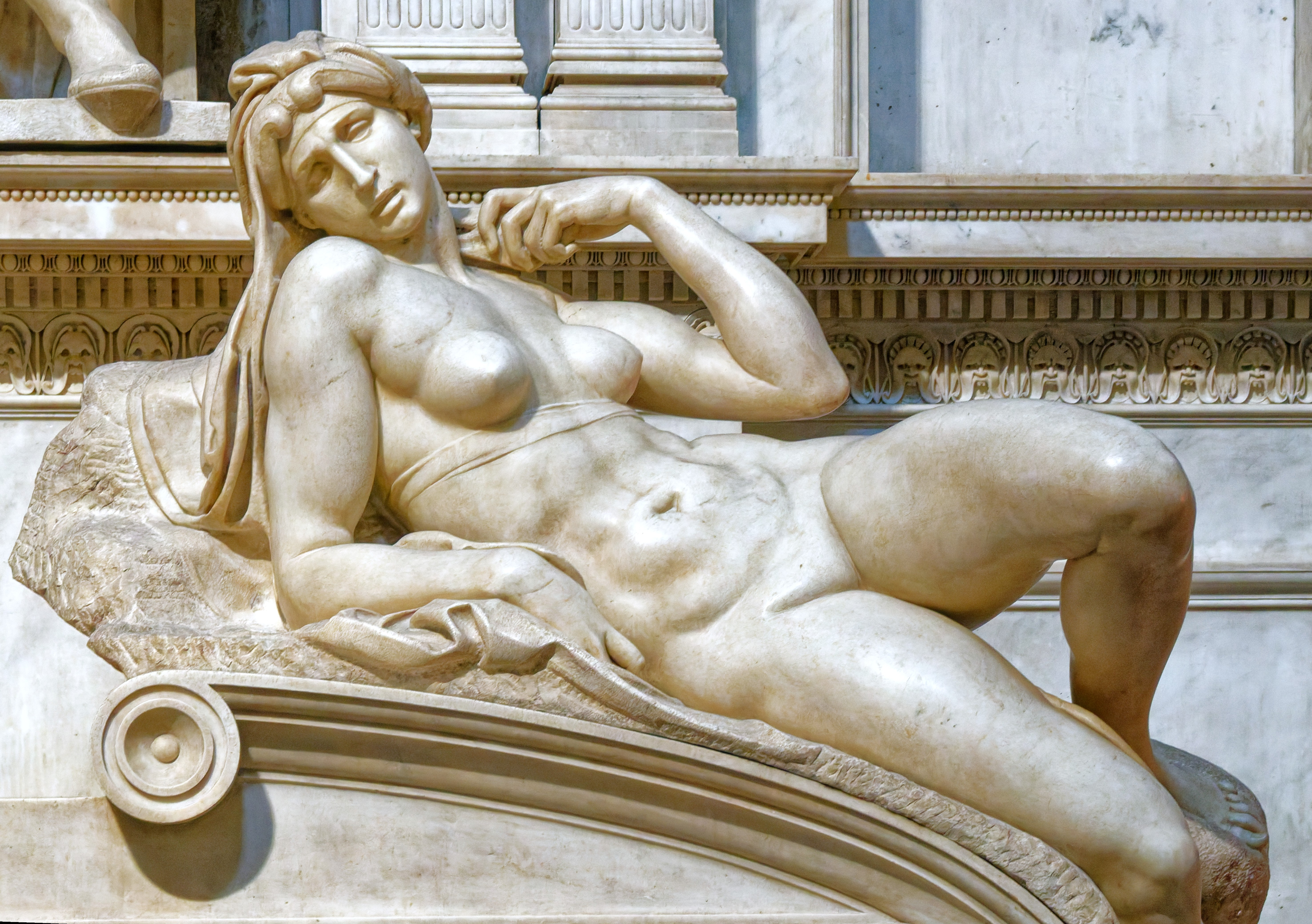
Dawn

Dawn is a sculpture by Michelangelo, executed for the chapel. It is 6 feet and 8 inches in length. Along with his Night, Michelangelo drew from the ancient Sleeping Ariadne for his sculpture's pose. This was in turn influential on Benvenuto Cellini's Diana of Fontainebleau.

==== Dusk ====
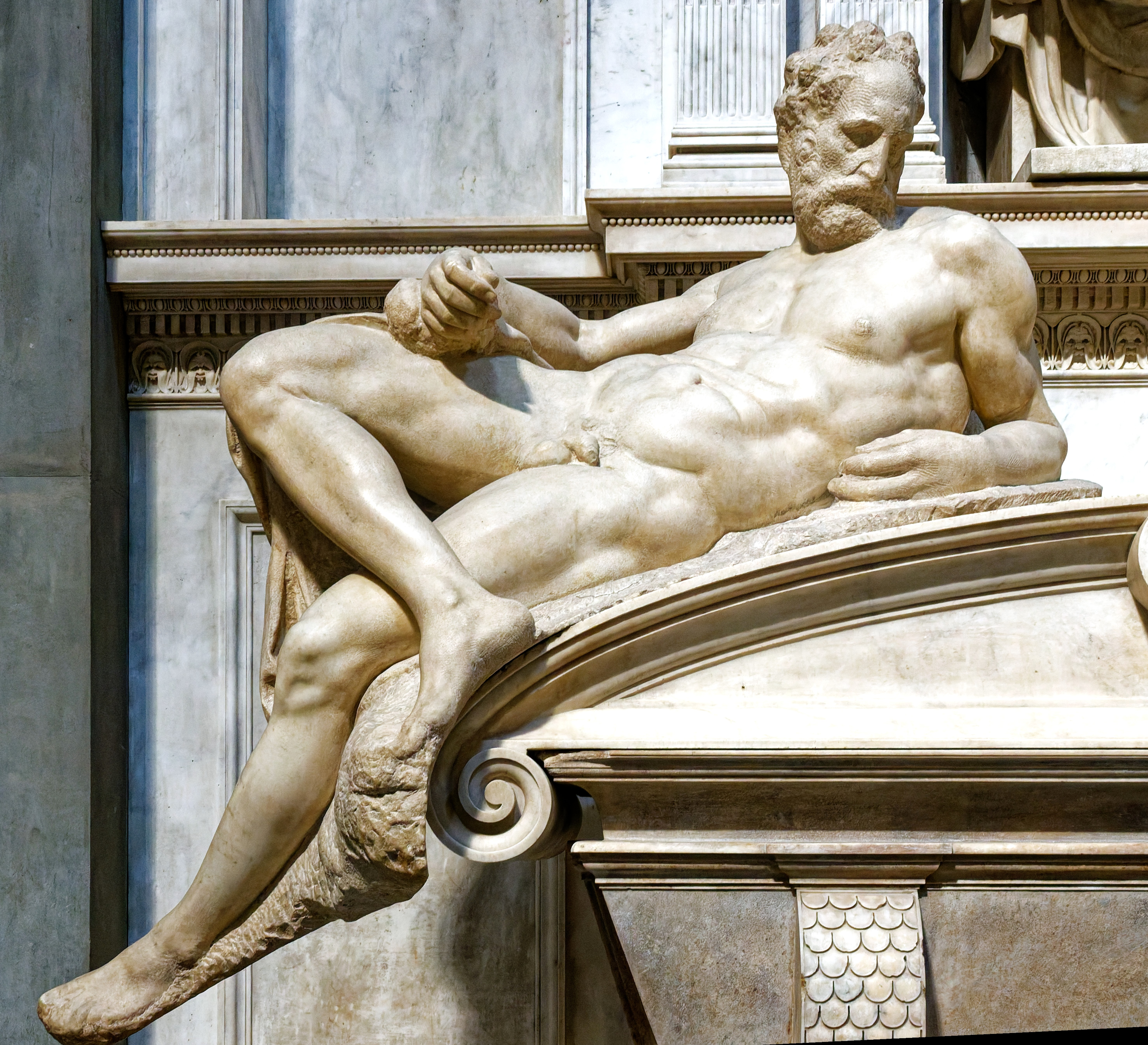
Dusk

Dusk is a marble sculpture by Michelangelo, datable to 1524–1534. It is paired with Dawn on the tomb of Lorenzo II de' Medici.

Among the various iconographic meanings proposed, the statue is seen as an emblem of the phlegmatic temperament or of the elements of water or earth. Michelangelo's study for Dusk is known for exemplifying his style of striking, unfinished drawings.

=== Tomb of Lorenzo the Magnificent and Giuliano de' Medici ===
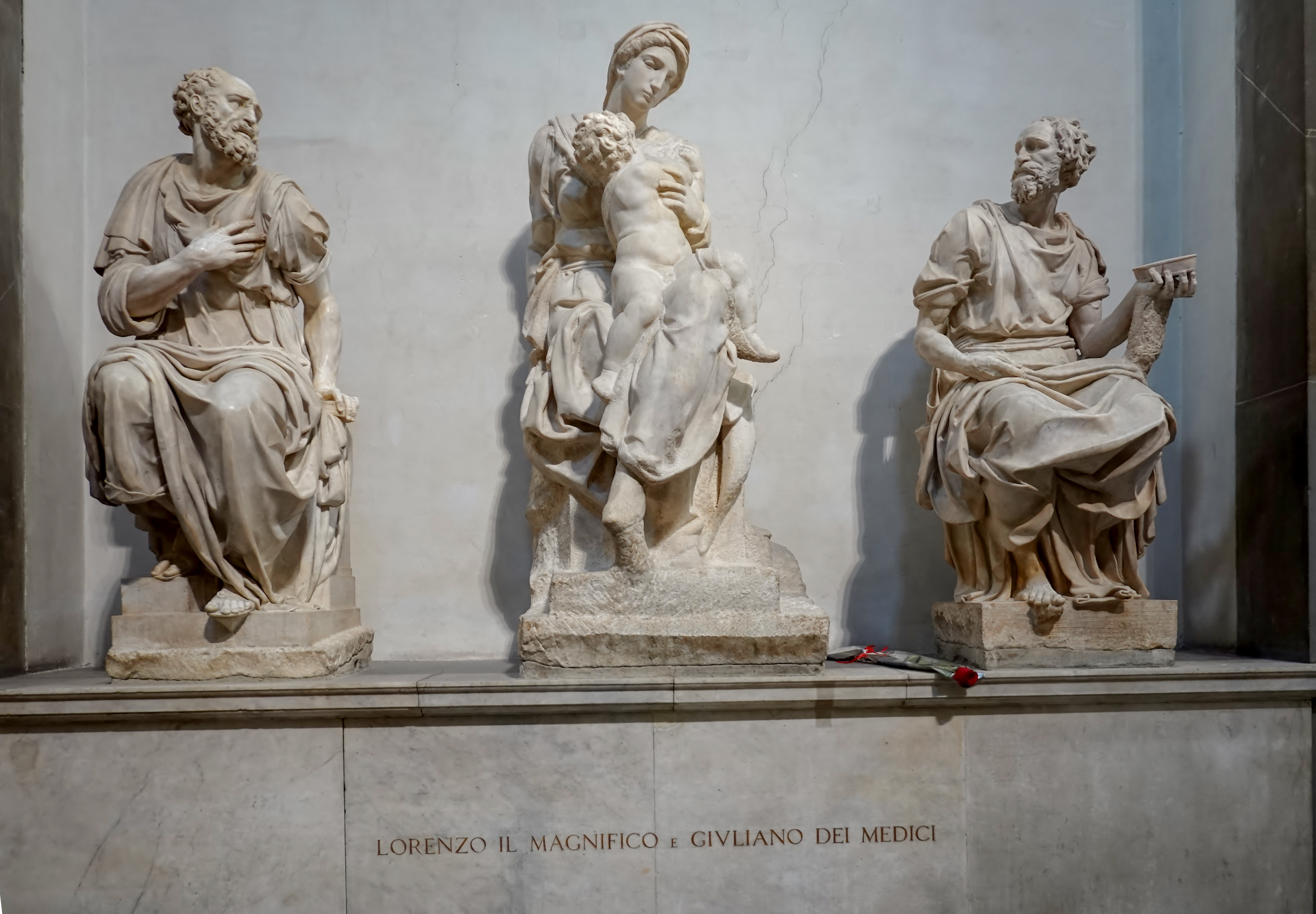
Madonna and Child (1521) between the patron saints Damian and Cosmas (1530s)

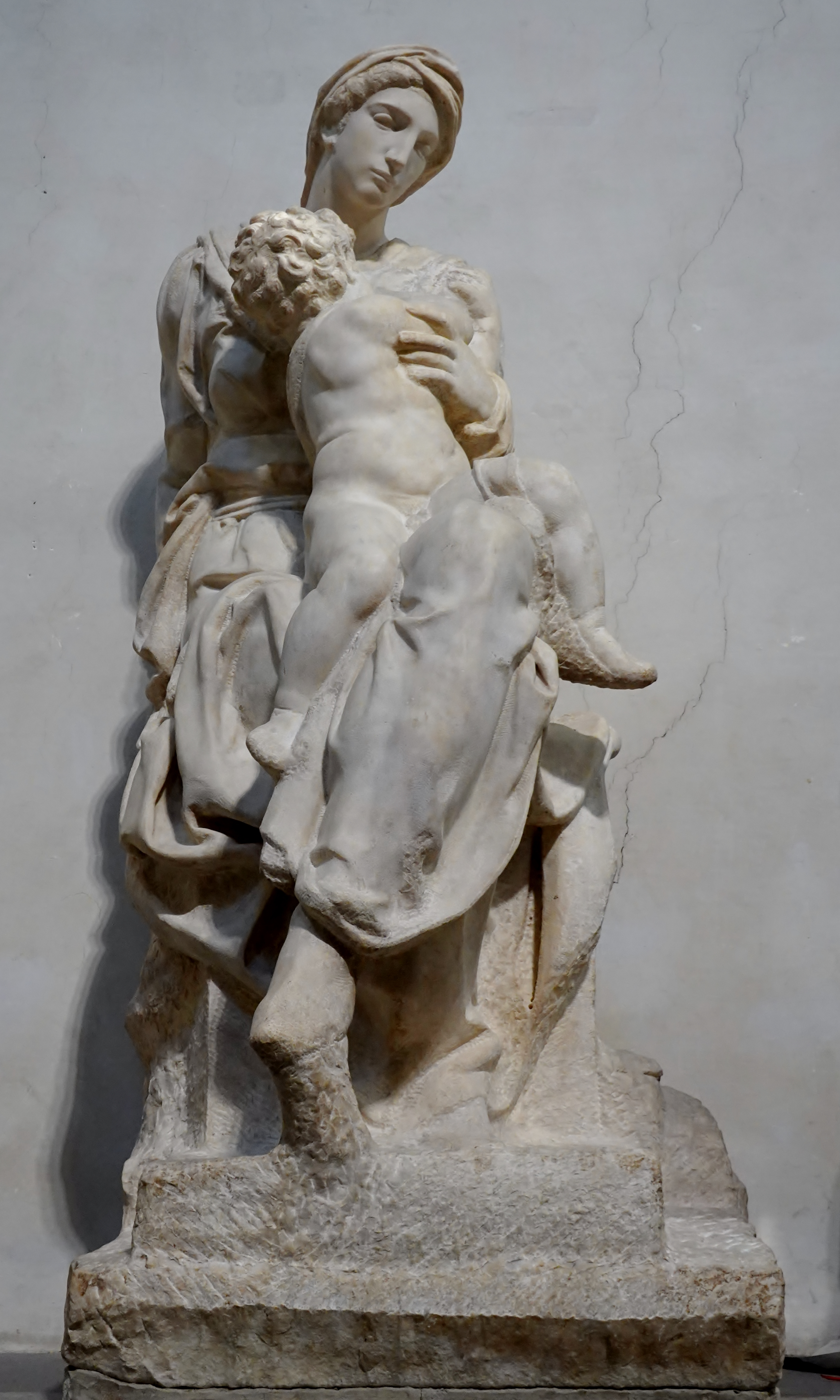
The Medici Madonna

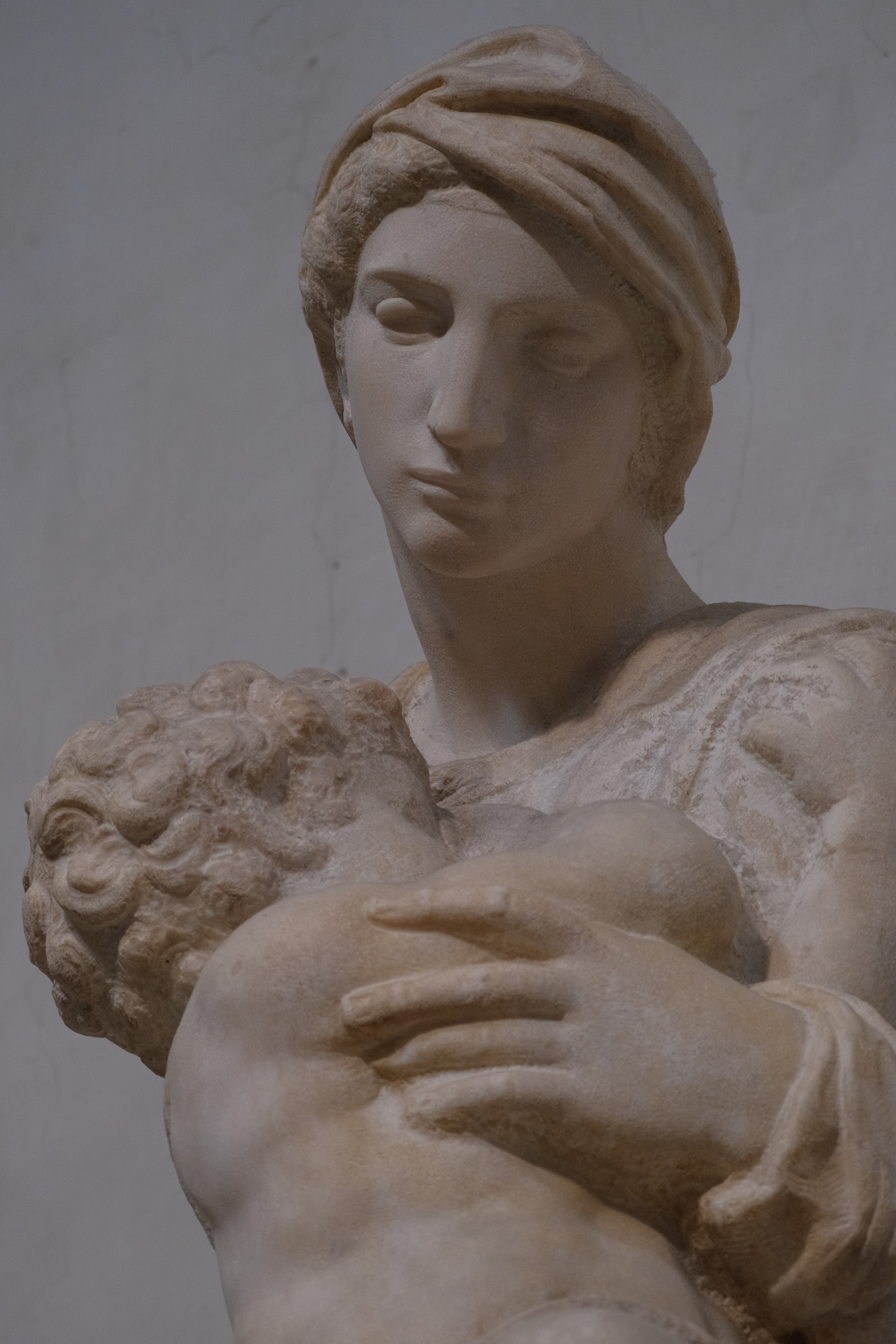
Detail

The main wall of the chapel is unfinished. Against it is the sepulchre with the mortal remains of Lorenzo the Magnificent (died in 1492) and his brother Giuliano (killed during the Pazzi Conspiracy in 1478), surmounted by three sculptures. In the center is Michelangelo's statue of Madonna and Child (known as the Medici Madonna), completed in 1521. The Madonna is flanked by the two patron saints of the Medici family: on the right Saint Cosmas, executed by the Florentine sculptor Giovanni Angelo Montorsoli in 1537, and on the left Saint Damian, by the sculptor and architect Raffaello da Montelupo in 1531, who began working with Michelangelo on the Sagrestia Nuova at an early age. Cosmas and Damian, who were physicians (medici), hold their doctor's boxes of salves and nostrums. Saint Cosmas is also attributed to Montelupo, together with Montorsoli, another assistant to Michelangelo, after a model by the master.

The three statues were later placed by Giorgio Vasari on a simple marble chest housing the remains of Lorenzo the Magnificent and his brother Giuliano de' Medici, for whom there was never the time to build a larger monumental tomb.

== Graffiti ==
On the walls of the scarsella is a series of graffitied figures and architectural motifs, referring to Michelangelo's assistants. A trap door in the room to the left of the altar leads to another small barrel-vaulted room, where the artist could retire in solitude. On the walls of this room a large number of graffiti drawings referable to Michelangelo himself were found. Since November 2023 the chamber has been open to visitors, who are limited to four at a time for reasons of conservation.

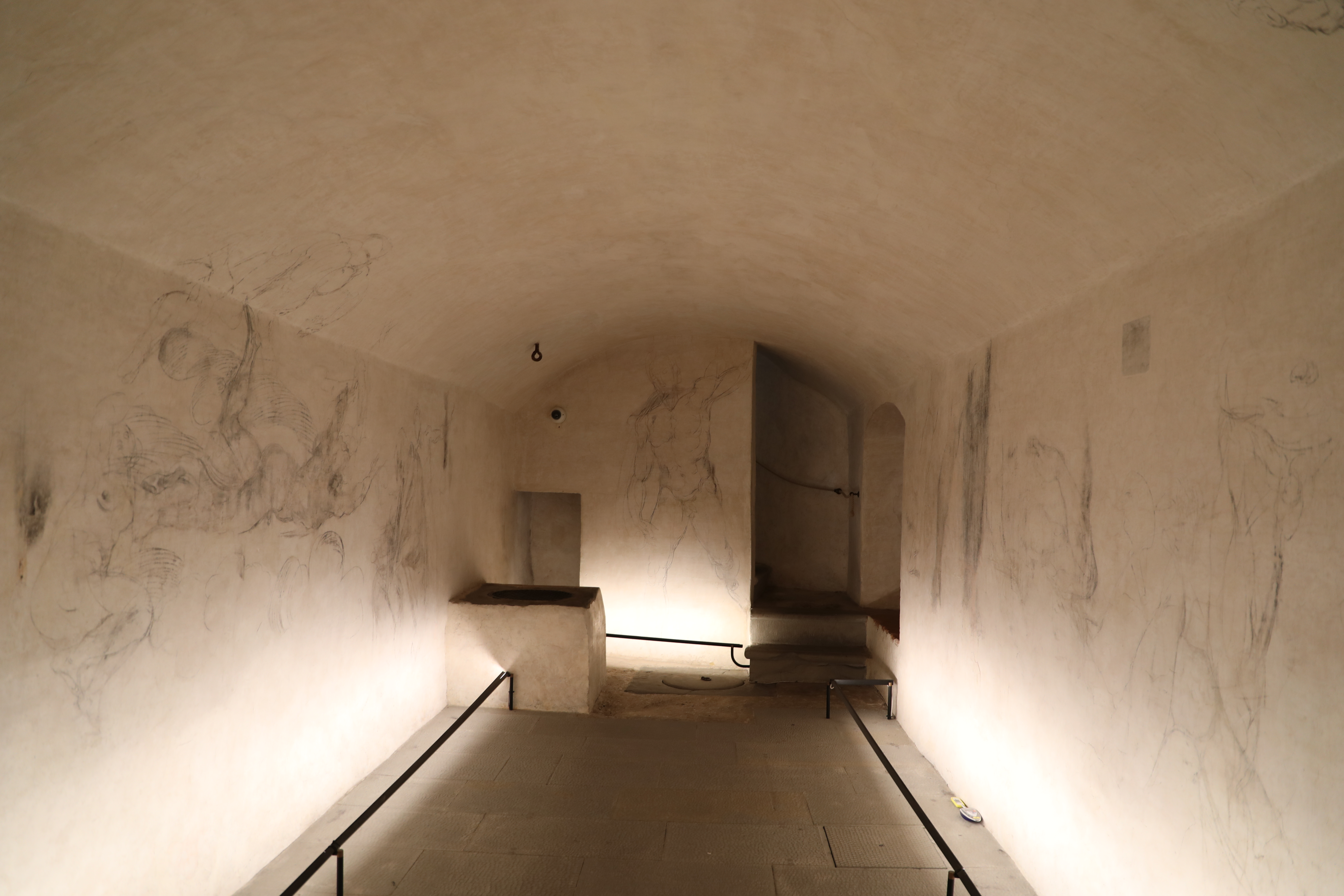
The barrel-vaulted room with drawings by Michelangelo of 1530

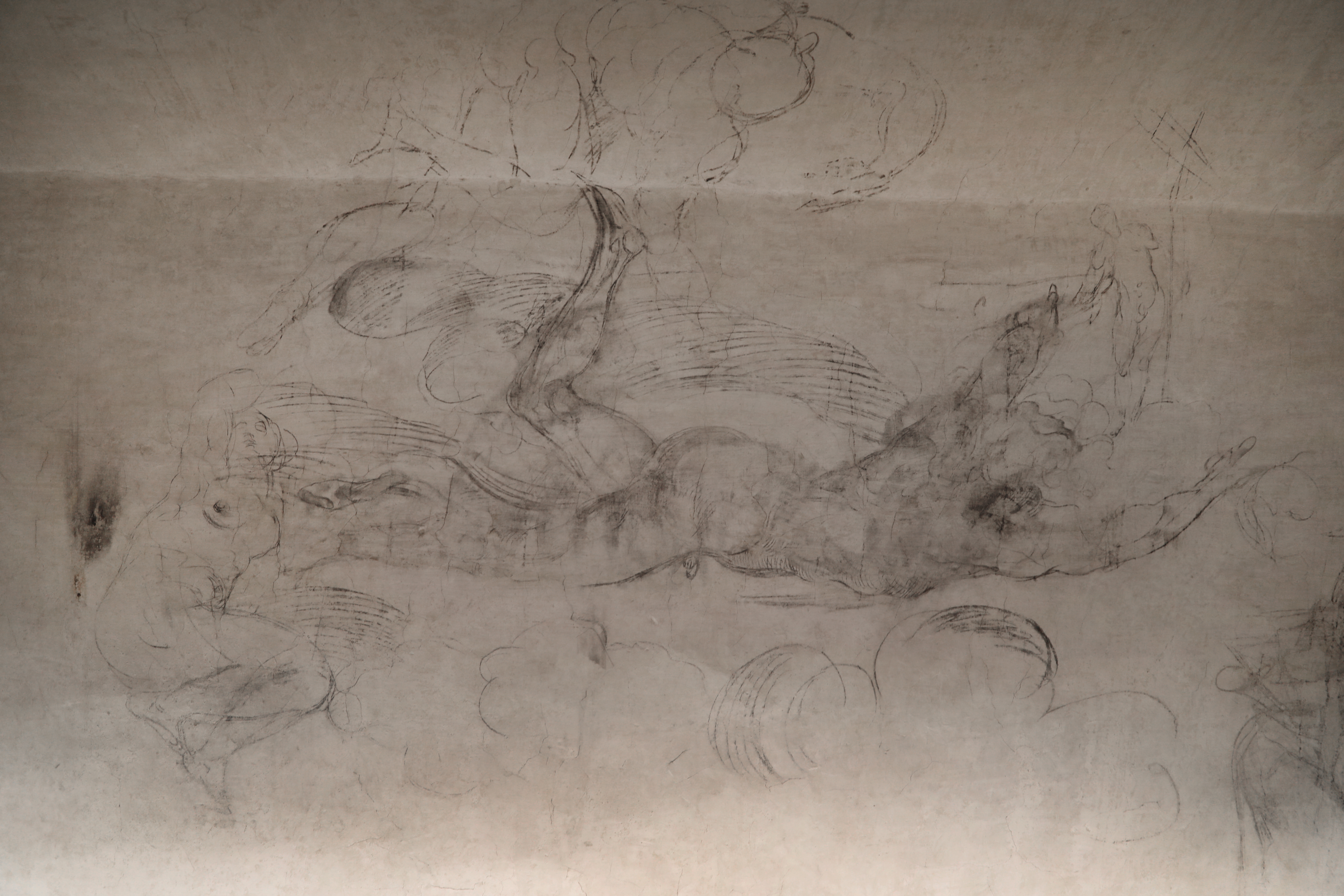
Drawings of a reclining woman and a flying man/angel on the south wall

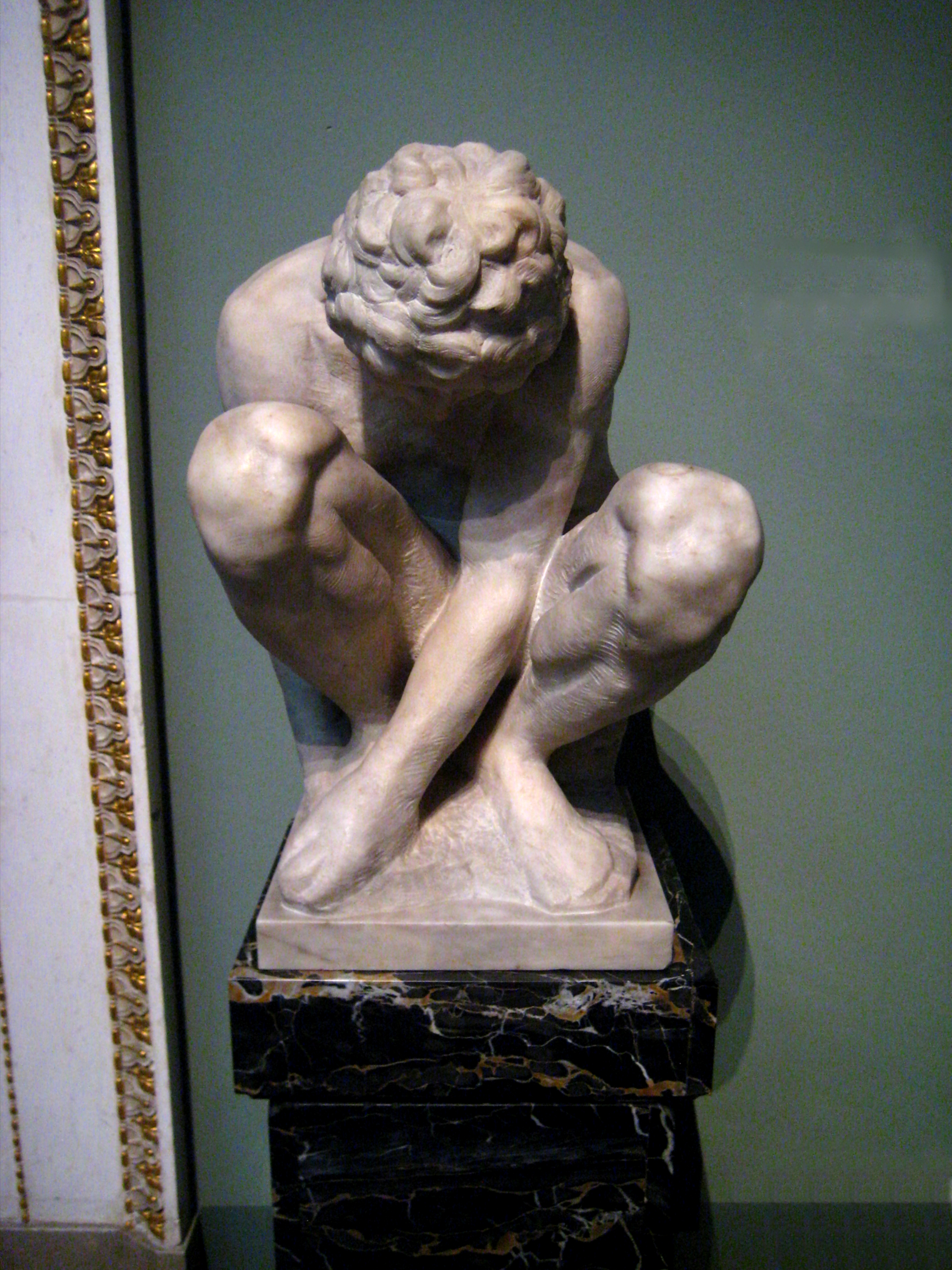
Crouching Boy, Hermitage Museum, Saint Petersburg

=== Other sculptures related to the New Sacristy ===
- River God, Galleria dell'Accademia, Florence (c. 1524), see at top
- Crouching Boy Hermitage Museum, Saint Petersburg (c. 1524)

== See also ==
- List of rulers of Tuscany
- Medici Chapels
- Basilica of San Lorenzo, Florence
- Florentine Renaissance art § Michelangelo at San Lorenzo
- List of works by Michelangelo
- 16th-century Western domes
