= Medici Madonna =

Sculpture by Michelangelo

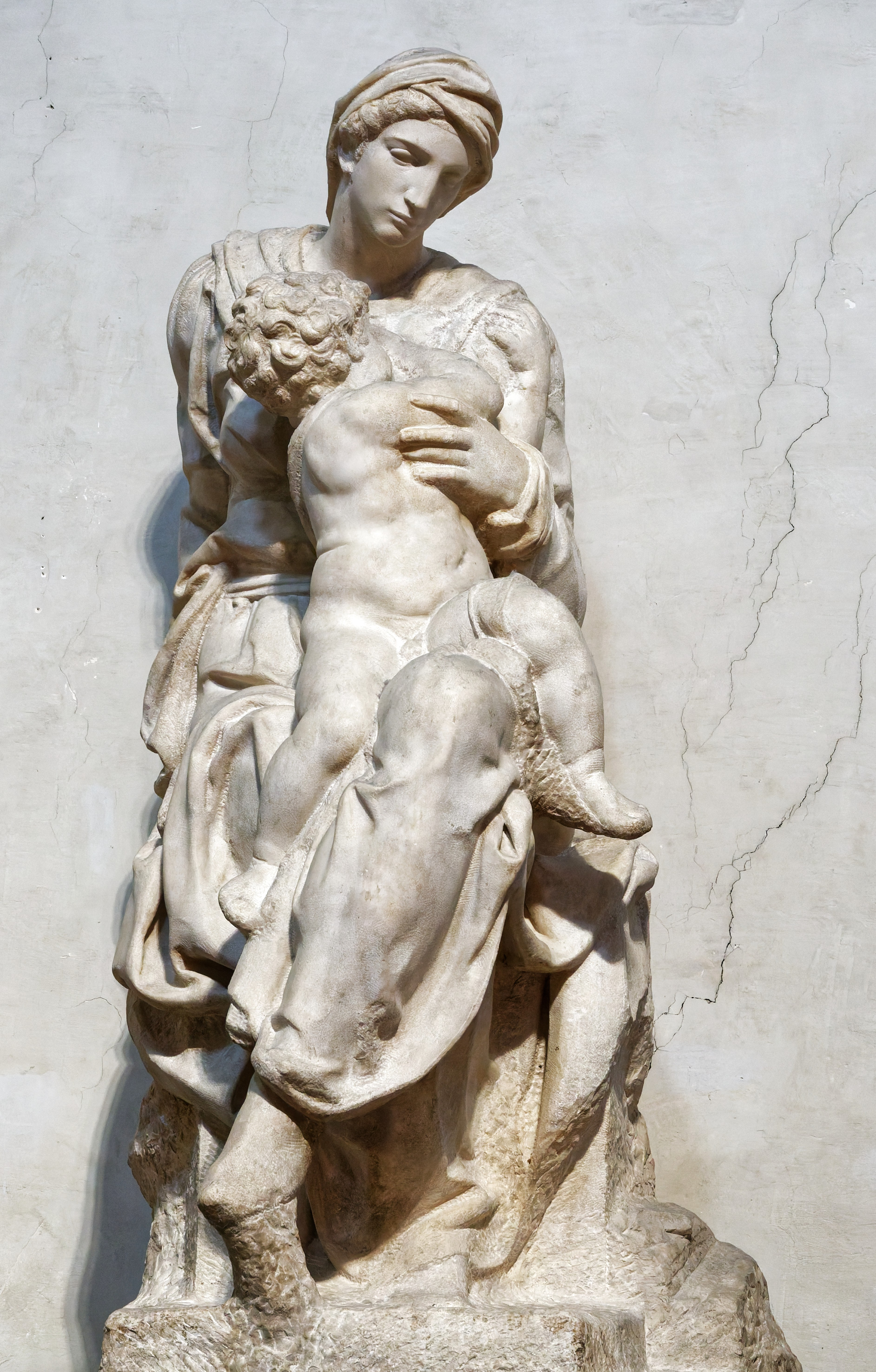
- Artist: Michelangelo
- Year: c. 1521–1534
- Type: sculpture
- Medium: Marble
- Dimensions: 226 cm (89 in)
- Location: San Lorenzo, Florence

The Medici Madonna is a marble sculpture carved by the Italian Renaissance master Michelangelo Buonarroti measuring about 226 cm (88.98 inches) in height. Dating from 1521 to 1534, the sculpture is a piece of the altar decoration of the Sagrestia Nuova in the Basilica of San Lorenzo, Florence.

The work, according to Michelangelo's letters and other documents, was one of the first works begun for the decoration of the Sagrestia Vecchia (Old Sacristy), as early as 1521. In 1526 it was still incomplete and in 1534, when Michelangelo moved to Rome, it was left in its current unfinished state and moved to the current location by Niccolò Tribolo.

The Medici Madonna shows the Christ Child sitting in the lap of the Virgin Mary and facing away from the viewer. Christ is attempting to nurse from the Virgin Mother, who by every indication appears to be denying her breast to her child. The Virgin is positioned sitting with her right arm behind her and she is gripping the edge of her seat; her left hand rests on Christ's arm but is in no way securing him to her or offering an embrace. Another indication of the Virgin denying the infant Christ of her breast is shown through the girdled chiton garment she is wearing that completely conceals her. There has been speculation that a Roman copy of a 5th-century statue of Penelope influenced the pose in this sculpture.

Several preparatory drawings (at the British Museum and the Albertina) show a less compact composition, in which the Madonna's legs were parallel to each other. The composition is somewhat similar to Michelangelo's Madonna of the Stairs, with the Virgin sitting on nearly cubic block and breastfeeding the Child. The latter is turning his body towards his mother, hiding the face from the viewer.

Through Michelangelo's personal writings, letters, and poetry that include recollections of his wet nurse, it is known that Michelangelo was very emotionally engaged with the motherhood of Mary, relating the Virgin Mother to his own wet nurse. It is believed that although the work was commissioned, the Medici Madonna is largely tied to his own deep-rooted personal issues.

== See also ==
- List of works by Michelangelo

== Bibliography ==
- Goffen, Rona (1999). "Mary's Motherhood According to Leonardo and Michelangelo". Artibus et Historiae. 20 (40): 35–69. doi:10.2307/1483664. JSTOR 1483664.
- Steinberg, Leo (March 1971). "Michelangelo's Madonna Medici and Related Works". The Burlington Magazine. 113 (816): 144–9.
- Baldini, Umberto (1973). Michelangelo scultore. Milan: Rizzoli.
