= Sleeping Ariadne =

Roman copy of a Hellenistic sculpture

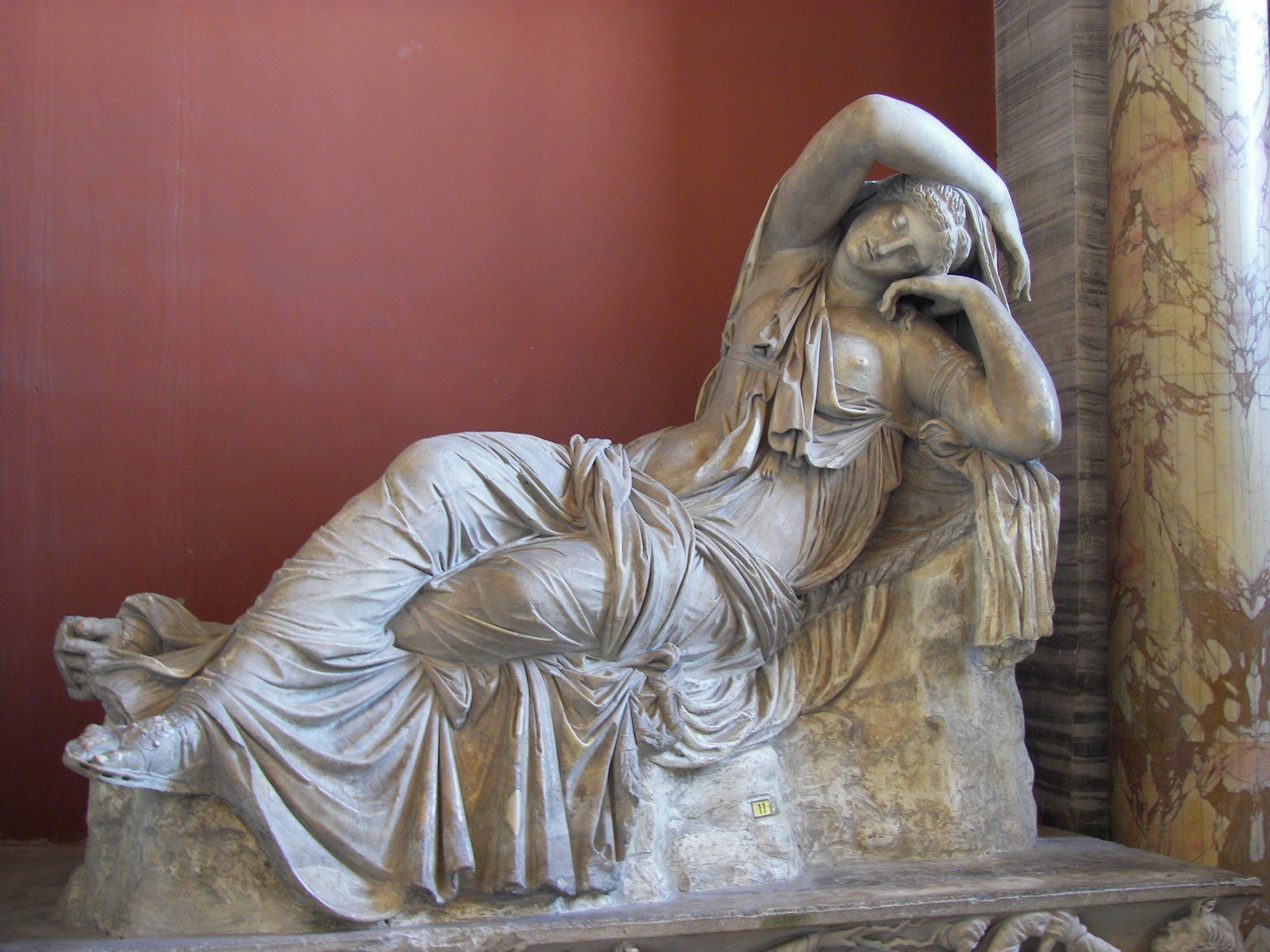
The Sleeping Ariadne, long called Cleopatra

The Sleeping Ariadne, housed in the Vatican Museums in Vatican City, is a Roman Hadrianic copy of a Hellenistic sculpture of the Pergamene school of the 2nd century BC, and is one of the most renowned sculptures of Antiquity. The reclining figure in a chiton bound under her breasts half lies, half sits, her extended legs crossed at the calves, her head pillowed on her left arm, her right thrown over her head. Other Roman copies of this model exist: one, the "Wilton House Ariadne", is substantially unrestored, while another, the "Medici Ariadne" found in Rome, has been "seriously reworked in modern times", according to Brunilde Sismondo Ridgway. Two surviving statuettes attest to a Roman trade in reductions of this familiar figure. A variant Sleeping Ariadne is in the Prado Museum, Madrid. A later Roman variant found in the Villa Borghese gardens, Rome, is at the Louvre Museum.

Purchased from the Roman Angelo Maffei in 1512 by Pope Julius II, it was immediately installed in the Belvedere Courtyard, which links the Vatican Palace with the papal casina called the Belvedere; there its neighbors were the recently discovered Laocoön and the Belvedere Apollo. Once she had been initially identified as Cleopatra because of the snake bracelet on the upper left arm, which was taken for the asp by which she died, supportive narrative could easily be brought to bear: Ulisse Aldrovandi thought he detected that "she appears to have collapsed and fainted", and a sense of fitful uneasiness has been ascribed to her by the modern viewer Sheila McNally (below).

The "Cleopatra" became the main model through which a conventional pose signifying sleep, with one elbow cocked above the head, was transmitted from Antiquity to High Renaissance and later painters and sculptors.

T.B.L. Webster noted the uneasy pose of the sleeper, between sleep and wakening, a Hellenistic innovation in the sleeping Ariadne motif long known from vase-painting, which now placed greater emphasis on the stress of Ariadne herself; perhaps, Webster suggests, it was reflecting a new, literary source that has not survived. Sheila McNally detected in the sculpture a new "sense of unease that informs the whole" and "an effort to throw off some inner discomfort — a sluggish effort, restrained by a slumber that is more oppressive than relaxing. Her drapery bunches about her legs, imprisoning her loins." Soon she may wake to threaten vengeance on Theseus, as in Catullus' description in "Peleus and Thetis".

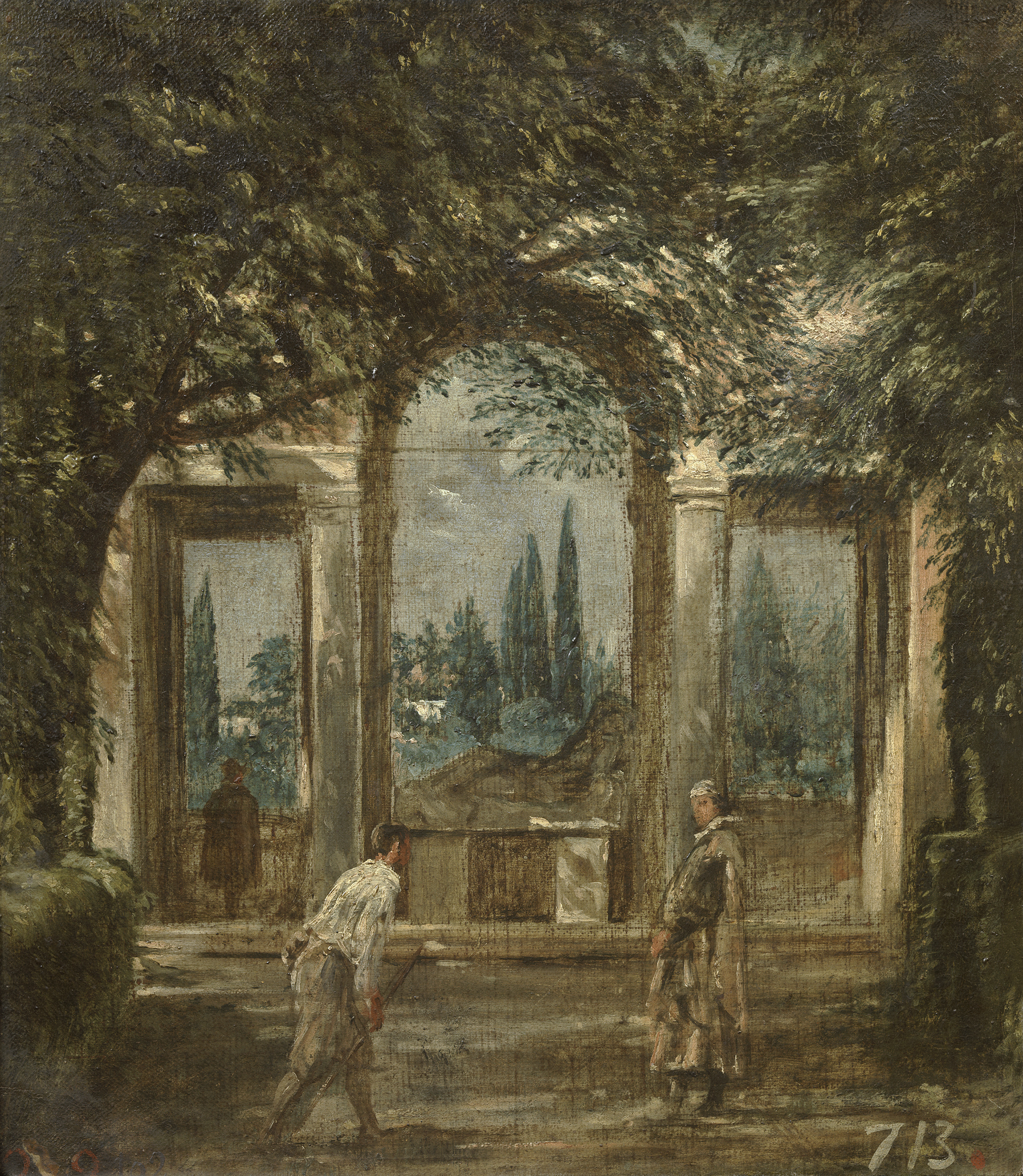
The Medici version of the Sleeping Ariadne painted in the gardens of the Villa Medici, Rome, by Diego Velázquez, c. 1630 (Prado Museum)

== Renaissance ==
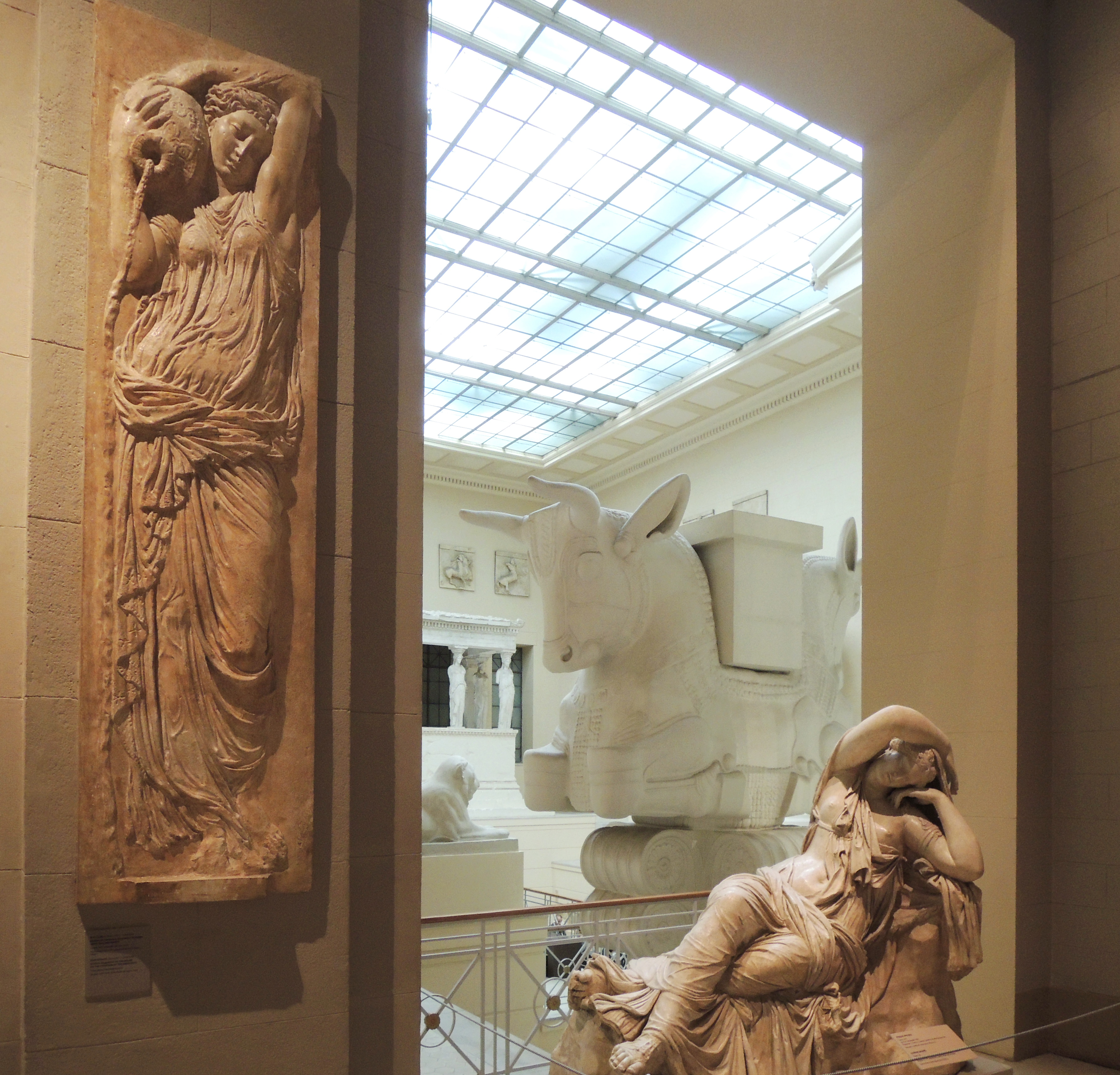
Castings of Sleeping Ariadne vs Nymph from Fontaine des Innocents.

Michelangelo drew from the sculpture's wrapping of the arms around the head in his Night and Dawn.

The Cleopatra, as it was then known, was set upon a Roman sarcophagus and fitted as a fountain in a niche at one end of the uppermost terrace of the Cortile del Belvidere, embodying in its setting the description of a Sleeping Nymph allegedly found by the far-off Danube, with a suitably Antique-sounding four-line Latin epigram beginning HUIUS NYMPHA LOCI... that was then making the humanist rounds. The epigram, which passed until modern times for a Roman one, was composed by Giovanni Antonio Campani, a humanist at the court of Pius II who moved in the academic circle of Julius Pomponius Laetus. But the Sleeping Nymph motif and the accompanying inscription applied to it became part and parcel of humanistic and fashionable recreations of paradisal garden spots with classical affinities— loci amoeni— right through the 18th century, all the while assimilated to the "Cleopatra", Leonard Barkan observes, "by a contagion among quite separate narratives that happen to converge in the enigmatic space of the signum/statue". The niche, if it was not a grotto from the first, was redecorated as a grotto in the 1530s, when Francisco de Holanda made a drawing of it.

In the 1550s, under the general direction of Giorgio Vasari the sculpture was reinstalled indoors in an adjoining long gallery, for which, still as a fountain in a shallow grotto niche, it served as the visual focus at one end; Danielle da Volterra provided the designs for the setting in what became known as the Stanza Cleopatra. When the Museo Pio-Clementino was established, it received its similar new setting, set on a sarcophagus that bears a frieze of the Titanomachy.

== Since the Renaissance ==
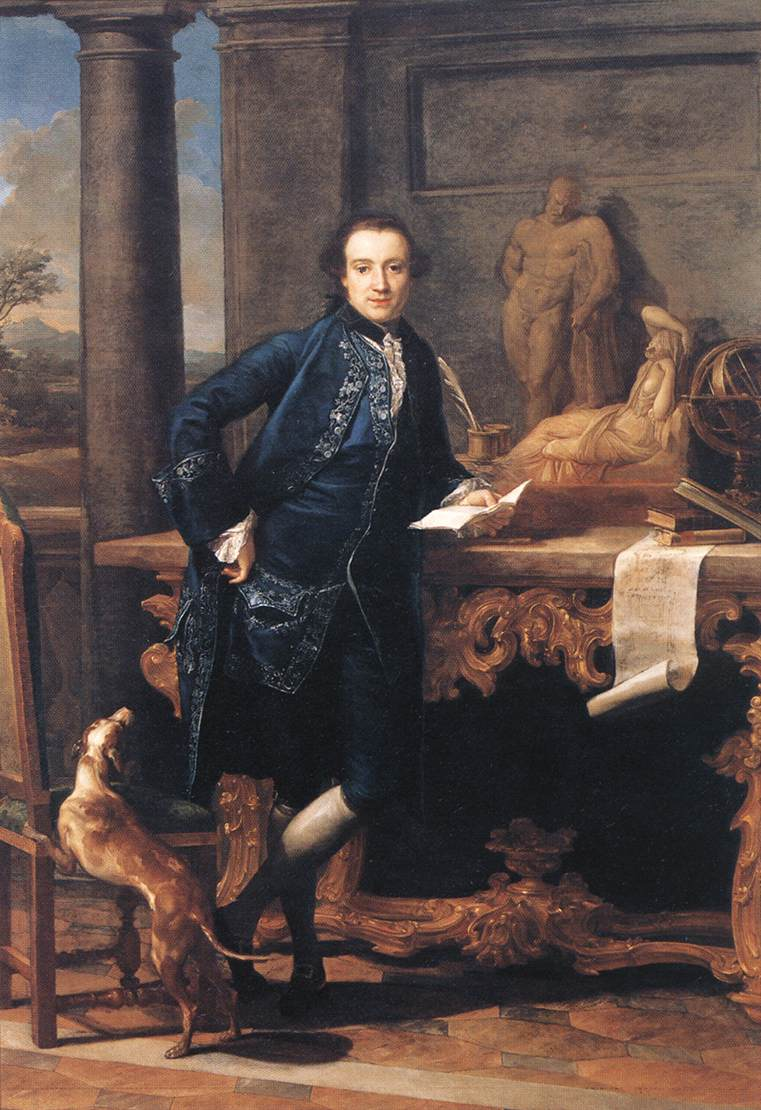
Portrait of Charles Crowle by Pompeo Batoni, 1762 (Louvre): as "Cleopatra" the Ariadne often figured in Batoni's portraits of Grand Tourists

Poems were dedicated to the sculpture during the 16th century, sometimes expressed as if in the statue's own voice, in the rhetorical device called prosopopoeia; Baldassare Castiglione wrote one of these, in the form of a dramatic monologue, which Alexander Pope Englished in the early 18th century.

The sculpture was one of a dozen selected by Primaticcio to be molded for plaster copies and then cast in bronze for Francis I at the château de Fontainebleau. In the process, the pose was slightly adjusted, and the sleeping nymph's limbs were gently lengthened, to accord better with French Mannerist canons of female beauty. From the bronze at Fontainebleau numerous copies and reductions were made. In Rome Nicolas Poussin made a small wax copy of the papal sculpture to keep by him, which has come to be preserved in the Louvre Museum. Copies in marble were commissioned by Louis XIV. Pierre Julien sculpted a marble copy during his sojourn at the French Academy in Rome, 1768 to 1773, and shipped it to France to demonstrate the progress he was making, as was the expected gesture of the king's pensionnaires. In Henry Hoare's picturesque garden at Stourhead, a lakeside temple contained John Cheere's whited-lead copy (1766) of the Vatican Ariadne with the suitably Antique-sounding verses beginning HUIUS NYMPHA LOCI.... In America, not very much later, Thomas Jefferson acquired a small marble copy of the Cleopatra, as he first knew it, for the sculpture gallery he planned at Monticello but which was never realised. It was a gift from James Bowdoin, in 1805, and remains in Jefferson's hallway.

Napoleon's agents in Rome naturally selected the Cleopatra to join the choicest antiquities to be taken to Paris, forming the short-lived Musée Napoléon; with Napoleon's fall, it was returned to Rome with the other treasures.

== Reidentification as Ariadne ==
Previously, Johann Joachim Winckelmann noticed that the snake actually represented a serpentine-form bracelet, and that the sleeping figure had no reason to be called a Cleopatra; she was a sleeping nymph, he suggested, or a Venus. Ennio Quirino Visconti made the secure identification as Ariadne, based on similar motifs in carved gems and sarcophagus reliefs. By 1816, Jefferson was declaring that his "Cleopatra" was Ariadne.

== Medici Sleeping Ariadne ==
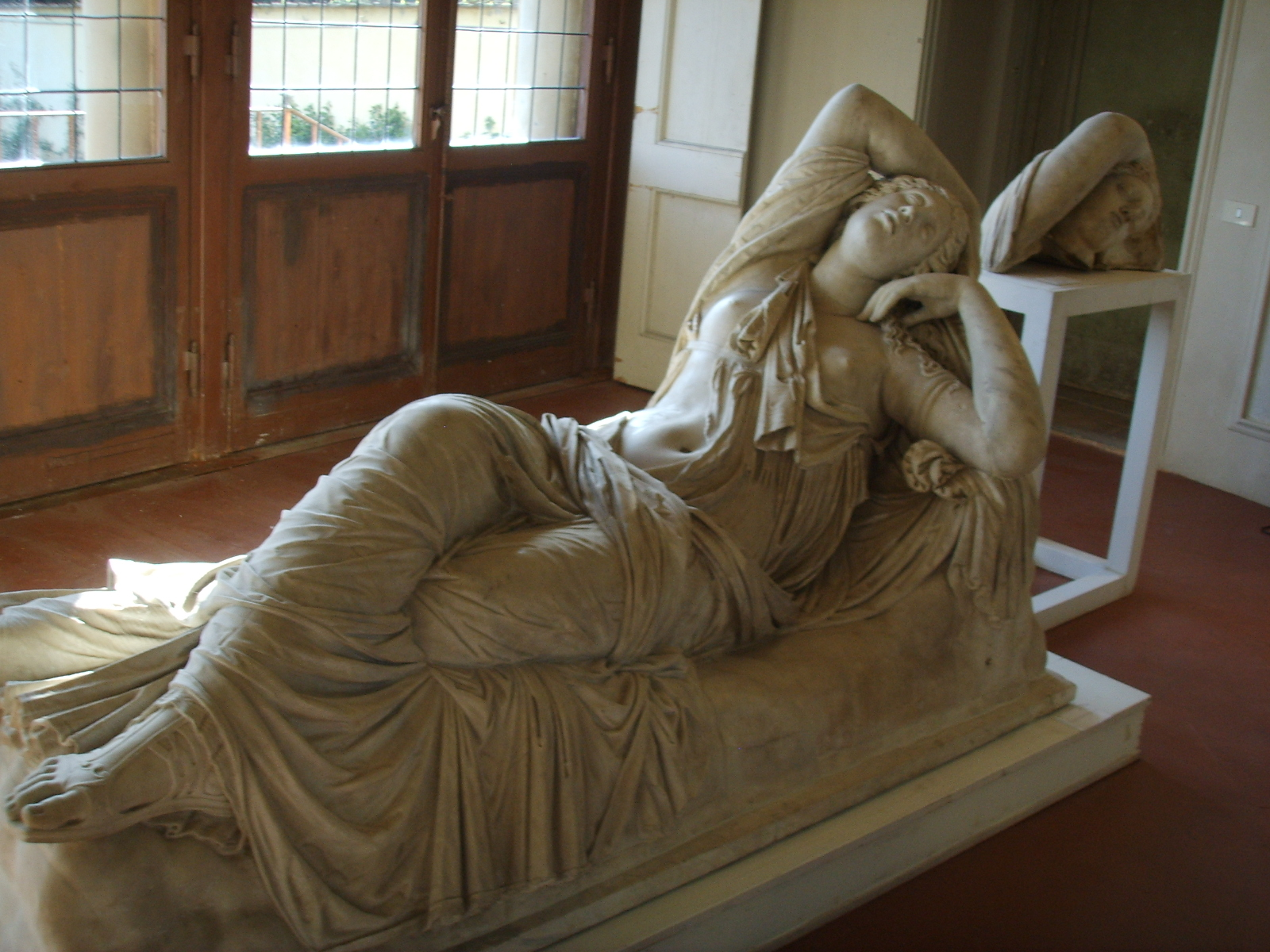
The Medici Sleeping Ariadne

Another version of the sculpture that was so long identified as Cleopatra was in the collections at the Villa Medici, Rome. It was not removed to Florence until 1787, and some connoisseurs disputed whether it was not in fact finer than the pope's. Today it is at the Uffizi Gallery.
