= Serge Venturini =

French poet (born 1955)

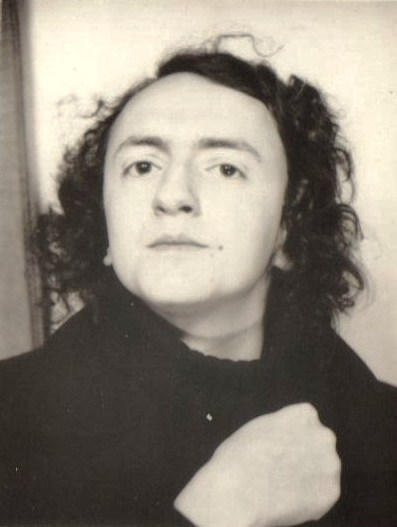
- Serge Venturini at 20
- Born: Serge Jean Venturini; 12 October 1955 (age 71); Paris, France
- Occupation: Poet

Serge Venturini (born October 12, 1955, in Paris) is a French poet. Poet of devenir ("destiny"), several metamorphoses run through his poetry. From his poetics of human destiny, through post-human and transhuman poetics, he came to the transvisible thematic.

== Biography ==
Serge Venturini is a poet and a French teacher in Val-d'Oise since 1996, when he came back to France after having lived in Lebanon (1979–1981) and Morocco (1981–1984). After a brief come back to France (1984–1987), he lived in Armenia (1987–1990) and in Poland (1990–1996), on temporary assignment for the French Foreign Affairs Ministry.

His mother (born in Figline di Prato) worked sometimes as dressmaker, sometimes as cleaning lady, and his father (born in Rutali) was a cartographic designer at the Institut Géographique National during the week, and, with his brother Jean, guitarist and singer at feast days in Corsican receptions during the 1950s in Paris. He spent his childhood not far from the Musée Rodin in the 7th arrondissement of Paris. From 1955 till 1979, he stayed in 3 rue Rousselet. He was introduced to Heraclitus, Empedocles, Arthur Rimbaud and Friedrich Nietzsche. He began to write when he was fifteen.

His poésie du devenir ("poetry of destiny"), lightning and crystal-clear according to Geneviève Clancy who revealed him, is influenced by Pierre Reverdy and even more by René Char, and is at the junction of poetry and prose, of politics and philosophy. It was recognised as such by Yves Bonnefoy, André du Bouchet, Abdellatif Laabi and Laurent Terzieff.

His books deal with the "fight of the being". Air, earth, water and most of all fire have a peculiar importance in his works. The Resistance of poetry lies at the heart of his daily fights in favour of a rebellious speech, freer and freer, more and more opened up. He elaborates upon his Poétique du devenir ("poetics of destiny") in his premier livre d'Éclats (1976–1999) with a questioning of human destiny.

Le livre II d'Éclats (2000–2007) carries on with this reflexion and questions the post-human destiny. Le livre III has been published in 2009 and deals with the transhuman destiny. At the end of 2007, he elaborates upon a theory according to which there would be, between the visible and the invisible, a passage, in a flash, a brief vision: the "transvisible". He wrote:

The dark underground fire burns the dead's white bones.

Behind my name is hidden a real warmachine.

My Word isn't a penpusher one. — It's a sharp blade.

— Serge Venturini, Fulguriances, n° 79, p. 28

== The transvisible ==
The transvisible is a theory according to which there is a passage between the visible and the invisible world which lasts no longer than a flash of lightning, no longer than a vision.

To fully understand this theory that is still in the making, it is necessary to refer to other key notions of the transvisible; we still have not found the way out of Plato's cave and we still mistake the appearance of reality for reality itself, in a world trapped in the fallacies of images and when the absence of such images is accepted as a token of un-reality, of untruth and consequently of falsehood, a world in which reality itself has become fiction; in "a world truly turned upside down", as Guy Debord once said, the virtual has become a reality.

The first of these notions is the posthuman which witnessed the death of the old Humanist movement that was born out of the Italian Renaissance. Beyond this notion, as in a second step, one could refer to the transhuman as the necessary move to go beyond the notion we have just mentioned. Dante's transumanar remains a major reference in the issue. "Transhumaner" would mean "to go beyond what is human", "beyond Good and Evil" as Nietzsche once said.

On a symbolical level, the transvisible could be epitomized by an arrow shot from the visible and that would vanish in the invisible. As the symbol of a philosophy of destiny and of evolution, the transvisible is the moment between what is already no more and what is yet to come, a moment with dreamlike qualities, when the mind itself passes from day-time subconscious to evening slumber and sometimes premonitory dream. According to Henri Bergson, it is the first function of consciousness to hold onto what is no more in order to look into the future.

Water too would seem to be a metaphor between the liquid word (the visible) and vapor (the invisible). The wind serves as another metaphor. When you do not notice it rustling the leaves or conversely, when nothing seems to move.

This is why it is difficult to explain how quick the passage moves between what is visible for the eye and the mind and what is not, as is revealed by the notorious fade in-fade out effect used in the movies when one picture succeeds another: as one picture gradually vanishes, the following one gets clearer and clearer.

Another example is the work of the Florentine engineer Maurizio Seracini, a specialist in reflectography and infrared imaging, who has used these techniques to search for Leonardo da Vinci's lost The Battle of Anghiari and to reveal Leonardo's underdrawing beneath the unfinished Adoration of the Magi. Seeing another reality beneath the surface of a representation is, in Venturini's terms, an encounter with the transvisible. Pablo Picasso raised a similar idea when he said that "it would be necessary to reveal the paintings beneath the actual painting".

Therefore, between being and non-being, in a world in which communication is increasingly being dematerialised as time goes by, the supporters of rationality see in all this nothing more than just an expression of what is not determined, improbable or unmentionable, thereby refusing to get involved in the whole issue. All that is not clearly expressed does not hold water and is consequently deemed irrelevant.

However, there were people like Merleau-Ponty, who at one time happened to be passionate about the links between the visible and the invisible. As a philosopher, Merleau-Ponty even discovered in it some sort of "profondeur charnelle". Poets too have also attempted to meet the transvisible in the flesh. What is void, empty and unthinkable offers countless possibilities in this respect. To see, to pass from what is opaque to what is transparent is required before reaching the transparency of the invisible. The openness of such worlds should also be emphasised for people with too rational a mind have chosen not to trouble themselves with such interactions. As media of transvisibility, poets act as torch-bearers in charge with the fire of eloquence; they are walkers between worlds. As we cross from the visible to the invisible, the transvisible transfigures Time itself.

== Works ==
- (in French) D'aurorales clartés : Choix de poèmes réunis par l'auteur, 1971-1995, Gutenberg XXIe siècle, Paris, 2000 (dedicated to Osip Mandelstam) OCLC 47692464
- (in French) Éclats : d'une poétique du devenir humain, 1976-1999, L'Harmattan, Paris, 2000 (dedicated to Paul Celan) OCLC 44448871
  - Review: (in French) Paul Van Melle, "J'ai trouvé une autre Bible", in Bulletin, n° 44 (2000), La Hulpe
- (in French) Le sens de la terre, followed by L’Effeuillée, Aphrodite en trente variations, 1999-2003, Éditions Didro, Paris, 2004 (dedicated to Yves Battistini) ISBN 2-910726-64-9
  - Review: (in French) Paul Van Melle, "Prose... sans ateliers", in Bulletin, n° 84, La Hulpe
- (in Armenian and French) Sayat-Nova, Odes arméniennes (translation of the 47 odes), with Elisabeth Mouradian, L’Harmattan, 2000–2006, Paris, 2006 (dedicated to Sergei Parajanov) ISBN 2-296-01398-8. This book has been labelled for the Armenian year in France, September 2006-July 2007 : "Arménie, mon amie!", and selected for the Price Charles Aznavour on 19 November 2006, at the Marseille Armenian Book Festival.
  - Reviews:
    - (in French) Annie Pilibossian, in Bulletin de l'ACAM, n°66 (January–March 2007), Val-de-Marne
    - (in French) Paul Van Melle, "Ressusciter les auteurs méconnus", in Bulletin, n°208 (September 2006), La Hulpe
    - (in Armenian) "Սայաթ-Նովայի ստեղծագործությունները ֆրանսերենով" (Sayat-Novayi stértsagortsutyunnére fransérénov, "Sayat-Nova's works in French"), in Հայաստանի Հանրապետություն (Hayastani Hanrapetutyun, "Republic of Armenia"), 16 February 2007, Erevan
    - (in French) Jean-Baptiste Para, "Historiens de l'Antiquité", in Europe, n° 945-946 (January–February 2008), p. 345-346
- (in French) Éclats d’une poétique du devenir posthumain, 2000-2007 (Livre II), L’Harmattan, Paris, 2007 (dedicated to Lucie Aubrac) ISBN 978-2-296-03301-6
  - Review: (in French) Paul Van Melle, "Pour une poétique de la pensée", in Bulletin, n° 214, La Hulpe
- (in French) Fulguriances et autres figures, (1980–2007), postface by Philippe Tancelin, L'Harmattan, Paris, May 2008 (dedicated to Alexander Blok) ISBN 978-2-296-05656-5
  - Reading of Fulguriances at the Théâtre Noir du Lucernaire in Paris, 16 June 2008
- (in French) Éclats d’une poétique du devenir transhumain, 2003-2008 (Livre III), L’Harmattan, Paris, 2009 (dedicated to Missak Manouchian) ISBN 978-2-296-09603-5
- (in French) Éclats d’une poétique du devenir, Journal du transvisible, (Livre IV) 2007-2009 Editions L’Harmattan, Paris, February 2010, collection « Poètes des cinq continents » ISBN 978-2-296-11117-2
- (in French) Avant tout et en dépit de tout (2000–2010), (dedicated to Marina Tsvetaeva), Editions L’Harmattan, Paris December 2010, collection « Poètes des cinq continents », ISBN 978-2-296-13176-7
- (in Armenian and French) Yeghishe Charents, Dantesque legend (1915–1916), (dedicated to Liu Xiaobo), Editions L’Harmattan, Paris December 2010, collection "Armenian letters", ISBN 978-2-296-13174-3
- (in French) Éclats d’une poétique de l'inaccompli, (2009-2012) (Livre V), (dedicated to René Char) L'Harmattan, coll. « Poètes des cinq continents », Paris, 2012 ISBN 978-2-296-55628-7
- (in French) Éclats d'une poétique de l'approche de l'inconnaissable, (Livre VI), (dedicated to Laurent Terzieff) (2010–2013), coll. « Poètes des cinq continents », éd. L'Harmattan, Paris, 2013, ISBN 9782343005225
- (in French) Éclats d'une poétique des métamorphoses, (Livre VII), (2013–2015), (dédicated to Gilles-Claude Thériault), coll. « Poètes des cinq continents », éd. L'Harmattan, Paris, nov. 2015, ISBN 9782343078311
- (in French) Du fleuve débordant Du fleuve sans retour (essai en poésie), postface de Philippe Tancelin, coll. « Poètes des cinq continents », éd. L'Harmattan, Paris, sept. 2017, ISBN 9782343127323
  - (in Armenian): "Հորդացող գետի մասին Անվերադարձ գետի մասին" (title in Armenian), by Yvette Nvart Vartanian, foreword by Hovik Vardoumian, preface by David Shahnazarian, afterword of Philippe Tancelin, project manager of the Élisabeth Mouradian edition, ed. VMV Print, November 2024 Yerevan 174 p. ISBN 978-9939-60-879-2
- (in French) Tcharents, présentation chronologique, dans le vent de l'histoire suivi de Nausicaa de Yéghiché Tcharents (Version de Serge Venturini avec l'aide d'Élisabeth Mouradian), coll. « Lettres arméniennes », éd. L'Harmattan, Paris, octobre 2018, ISBN 9782343158617.
- (in French) Tcharents our contemporary suivi de la traduction du poème Foules affolées avec l'aide d'Élisabeth Mouradian, coll. « Lettres arméniennes », éd. L'Harmattan, Paris, février 2020. ISBN 9782343158617
- (in French) Vie au bord des livres (2017–2026) suivi de Du style contre l'homme et contre le temps (long article en poésie dédié à « Marielle Macé l'inspirante ») (2018–2026), éd. VMV Print, Erevan mai 2026, 801 p.. ISBN 9789939609690 Book dedicated to Pierre Reverdy
