= Male Back with a Flag =

Drawing by Michelangelo

Coordinates: 48.2042°N 16.3678°E

Male Back With a Flag
- Studie zu dem eine Lanze tragenden Soldaten des geplanten Wandgemäldes "Schlacht von Cascina" (German)
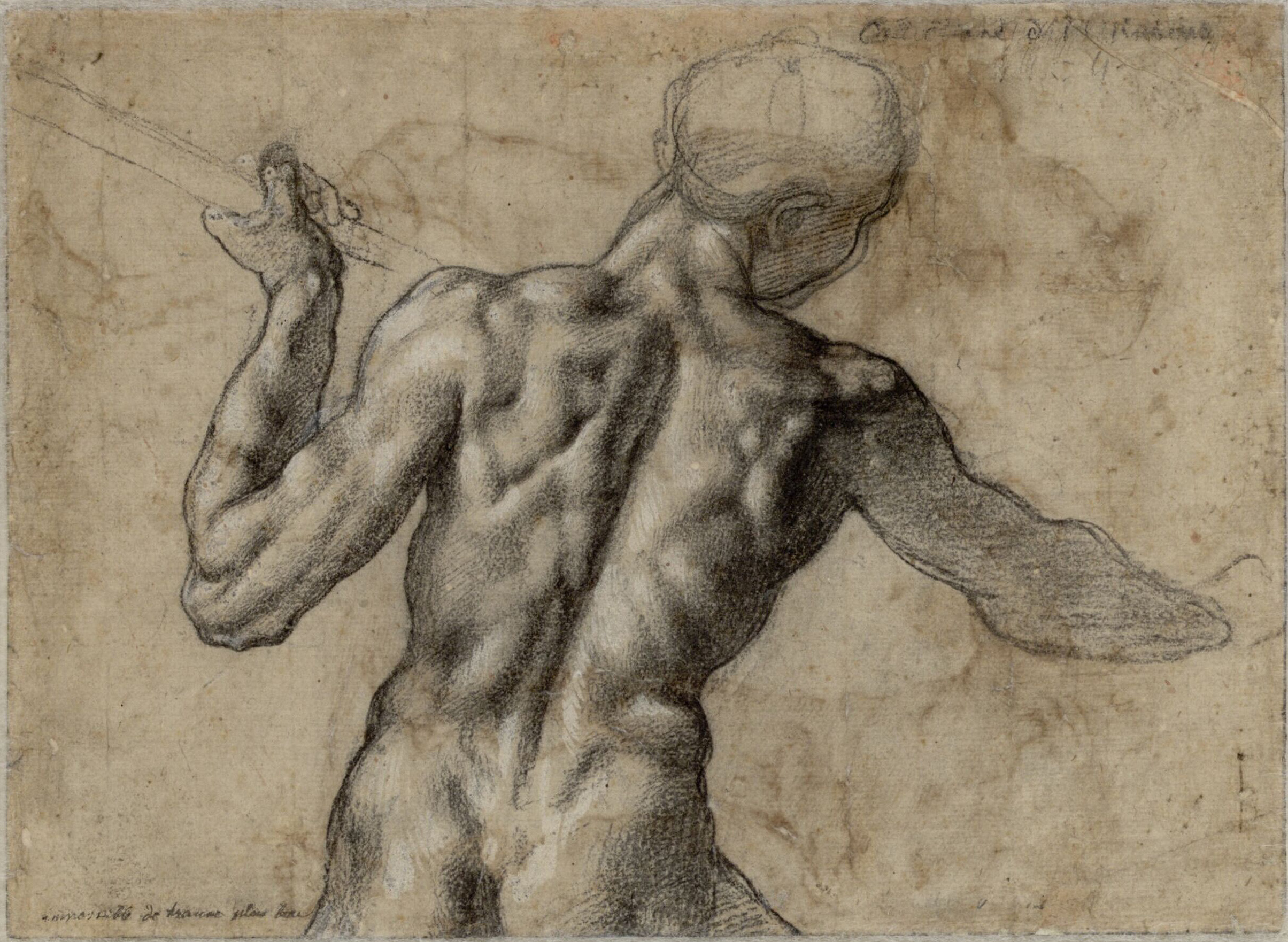
- Medium: chalk drawing
- Dimensions: 19.6 cm × 27 cm (7.7 in × 11 in)
- Location: Albertina; Vienna

Male Back With a Flag is a chalk drawing by Michelangelo Buonarroti, from 1504.

== Description ==
The painting is a drawing on paper, with dimensions of 19.6 x 27 centimeters. It is in the collection of the Albertina, Vienna.

== Analysis ==
It was a study for the planned fresco Battle of Cascina.

== See also ==
- List of works by Michelangelo

== Sources ==
- Eugène Müntz (17 January 2012). Michelangelo. Parkstone International. pp. 207–. ISBN 978-1-78310-023-1.
- Ludwig Goldscheider, ed. (1951). Drawings. Phaidon Press.
