= Battle of Cascina (Michelangelo) =

Fresco commissioned from Michelangelo

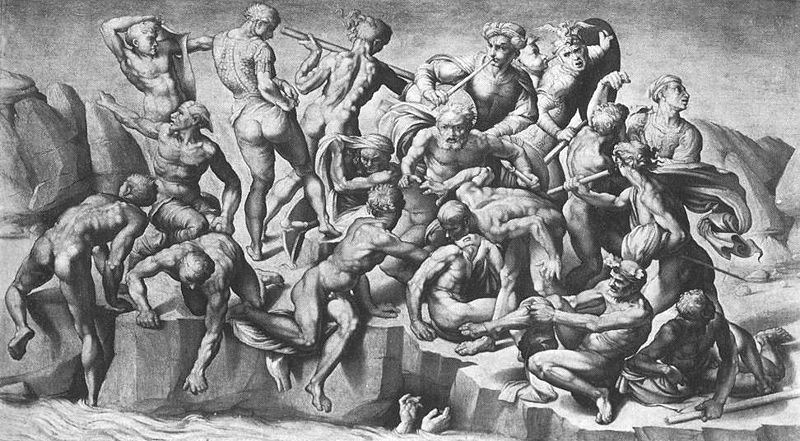
- Copy of the Battle by Michelangelo's pupil Aristotele da Sangallo
- Artist: Michelangelo
- Preceded by: Doni Tondo
- Followed by: Sistine Chapel ceiling

The Battle of Cascina is a painting in fresco commissioned from Michelangelo for the Palazzo Vecchio in Florence. He created only the preparatory drawing before being called to Rome by Pope Julius II, where he worked on the Pope's tomb; before completing this project, he returned to Florence for some months to complete the cartoon.

== Origins ==
The work was commissioned from Michelangelo by Piero Soderini, statesman of the Republic of Florence. It was intended for a wall of the Salone dei Cinquecento in the Palazzo Vecchio. The opposite wall was to be decorated by Leonardo da Vinci, who was commissioned to depict the Battle of Anghiari. The two battles were notable medieval Florentine victories. The Battle of Cascina was fought on 28 July 1364 between the troops of Florence and Pisa, resulting in victory of the former. A thousand Pisans were killed and two hundred more were captured.

== Description ==
Michelangelo never completed the painting, but did produce a complete cartoon of the composition. The cartoon was copied by several artists, the most notable extant copy being by Michelangelo's pupil Sangallo. Some of Michelangelo's preparatory drawings also survive, along with prints of part of the scene by Marcantonio Raimondi. According to Michelangelo's biographer Giorgio Vasari, the original cartoon was deliberately cut up, while its owner the Duke Giuliano de Medici was recovering from an illness, by other admiring artisans and distributed across Italy. Vasari states that the last pieces he saw were in Mantua.

Michelangelo depicted a scene at the beginning of the battle, when the Florentine army was initially taken by surprise in the attack by the Pisans. He depicts Florentine soldiers bathing naked in the river Arno, responding to a trumpet warning of the Pisan attack. As the soldiers emerge from the river and buckle on their armour, they are threatened by shots from the Pisans. Several soldiers look or point toward the Pisan position to the left. One soldier has apparently been hit and fallen back into the river, while others leap energetically into action.

By choosing this episode, Michelangelo could depict his favoured topic: the nude male figure in various postures.

== Studies ==
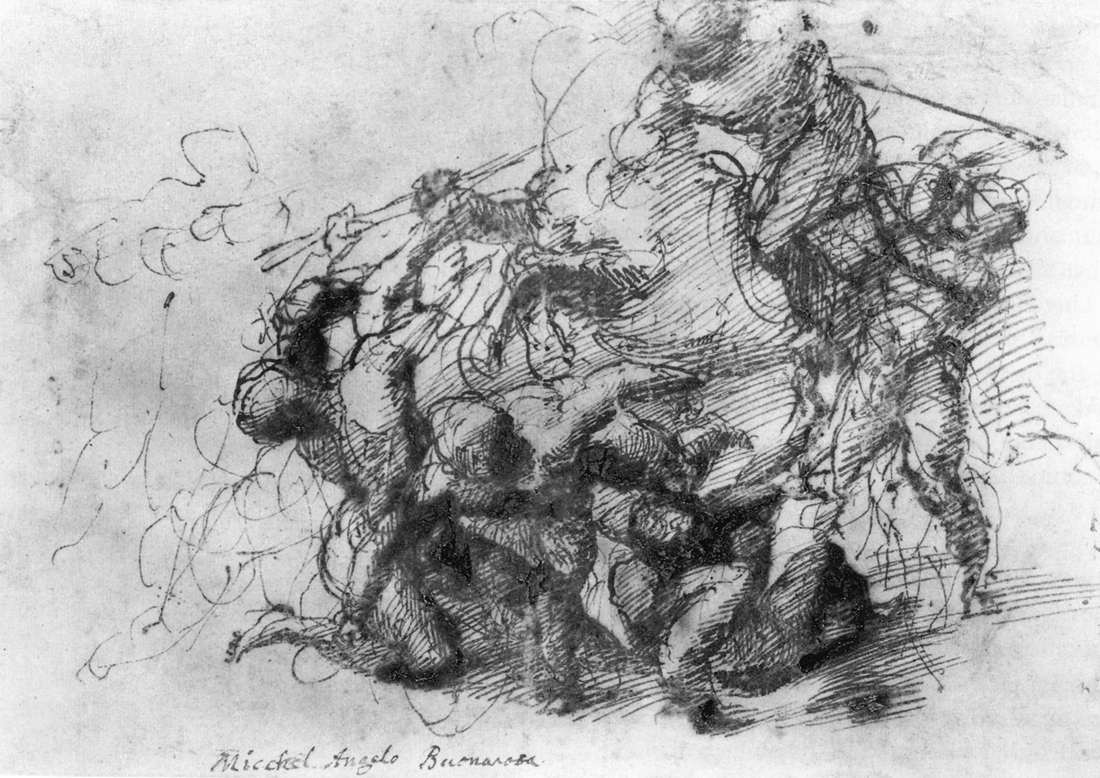
Study for the composition of Battle of Cascina

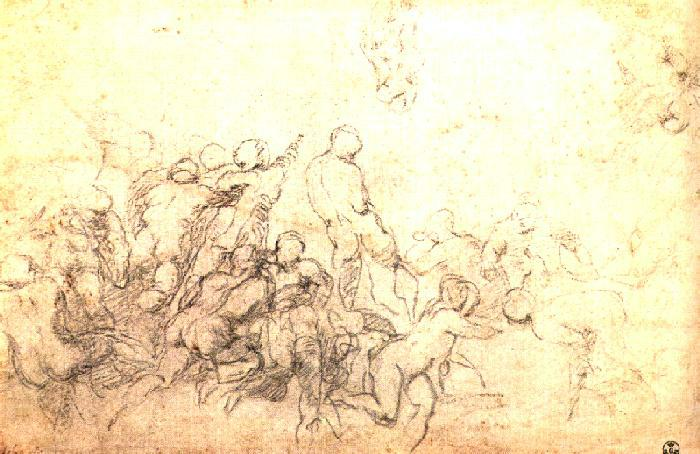
Compositional study for the Battle of Cascina

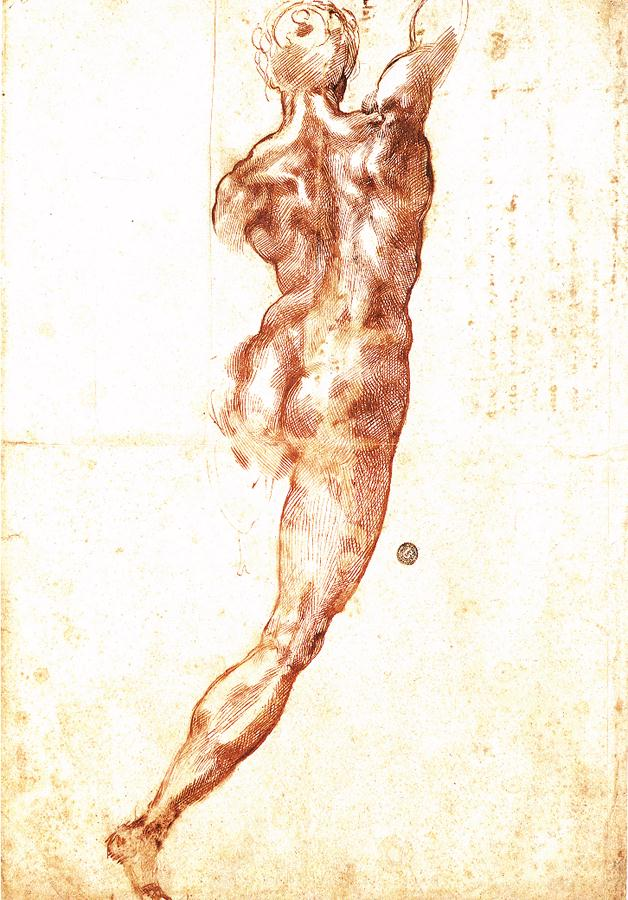
Figure study not used in final composition

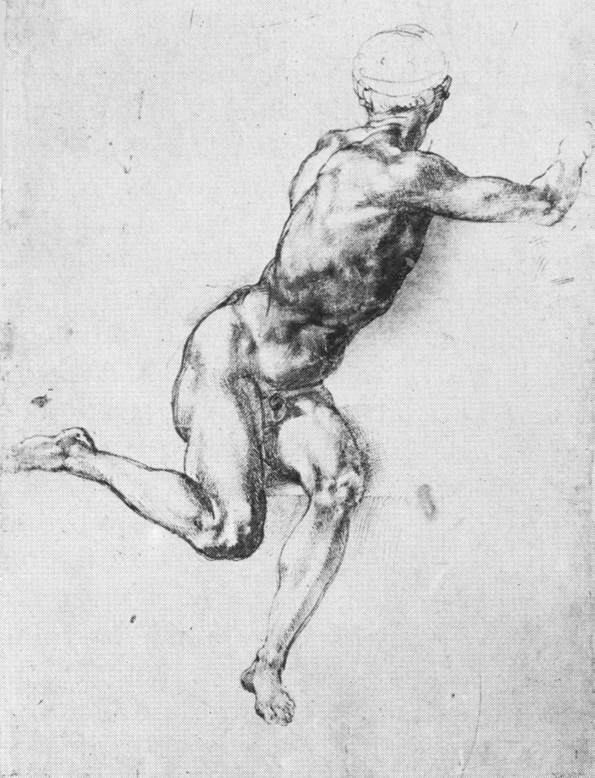
Study for the twisted man leaning into the center

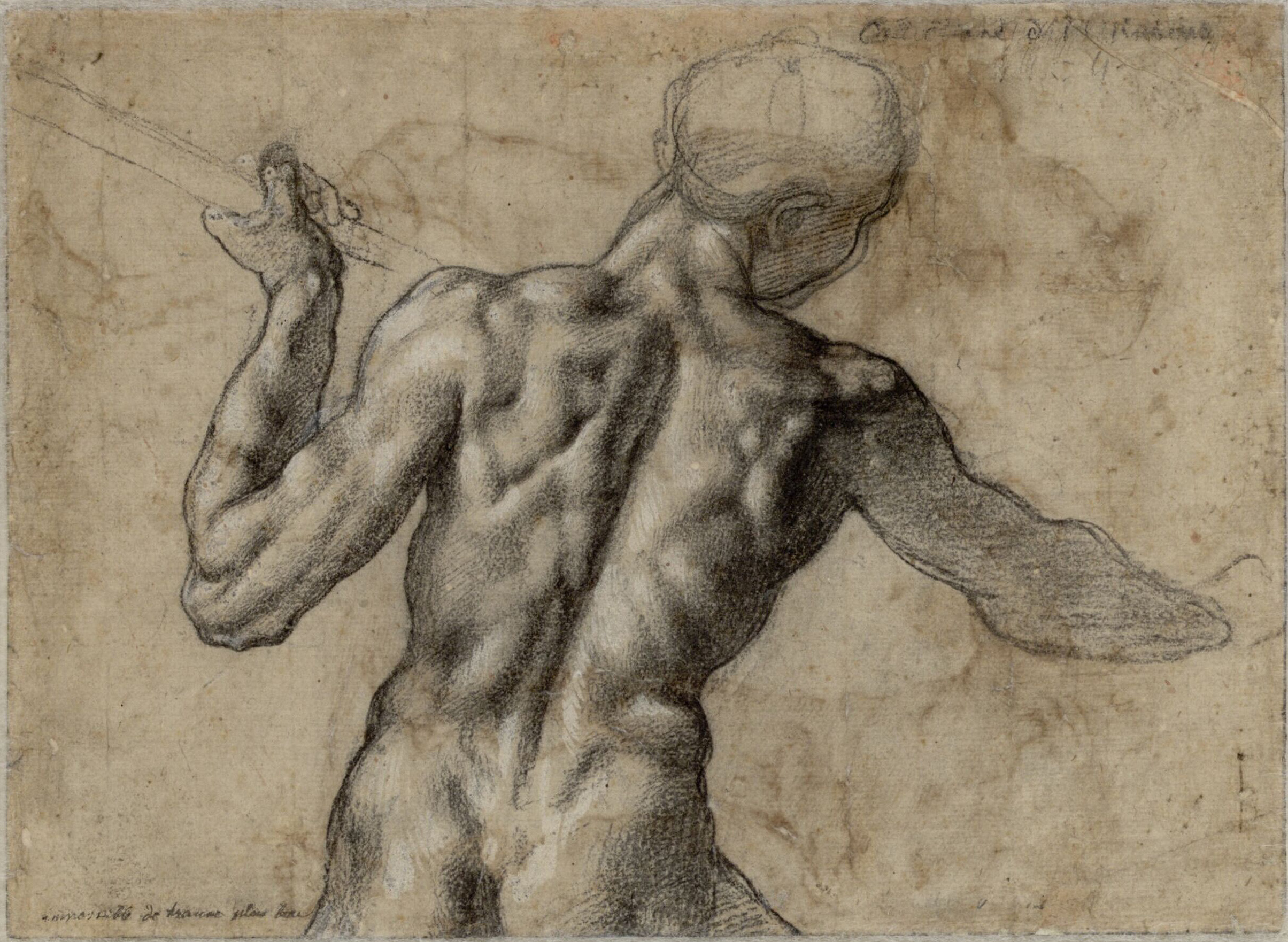
Male Back with a Lance in the upper background left off center

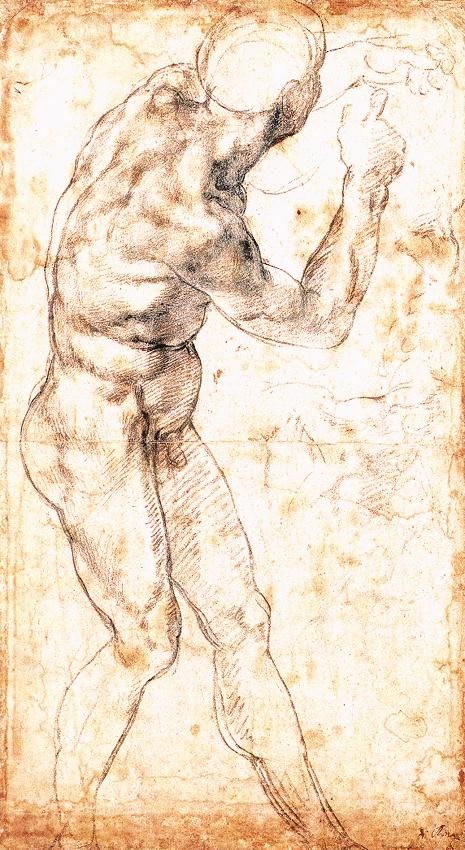
Study for the standing figure third from the right

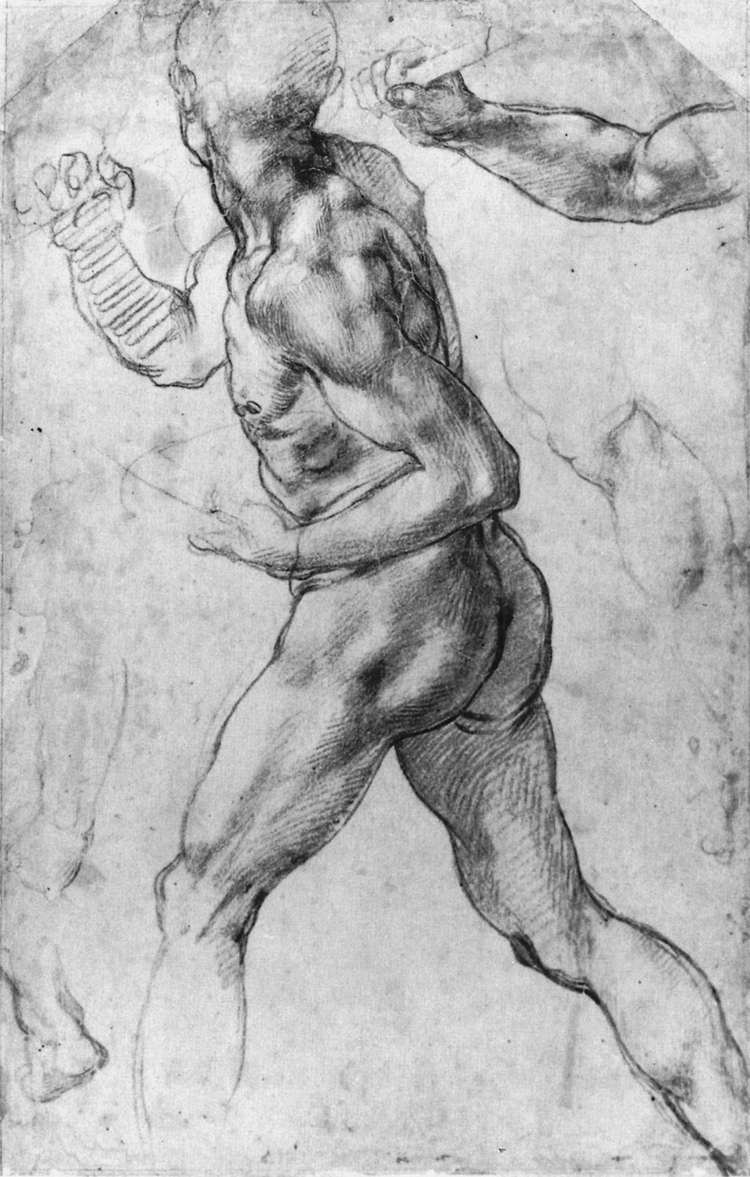
Study for the first figure on the right standing with a mace in his right hand

== See also ==
- List of works by Michelangelo
- The Battle of Anghiari by Leonardo da Vinci, the pendant to this painting (also lost)
