= The Battle of Anghiari (Leonardo) =

Uncompleted mural by Leonardo da Vinci

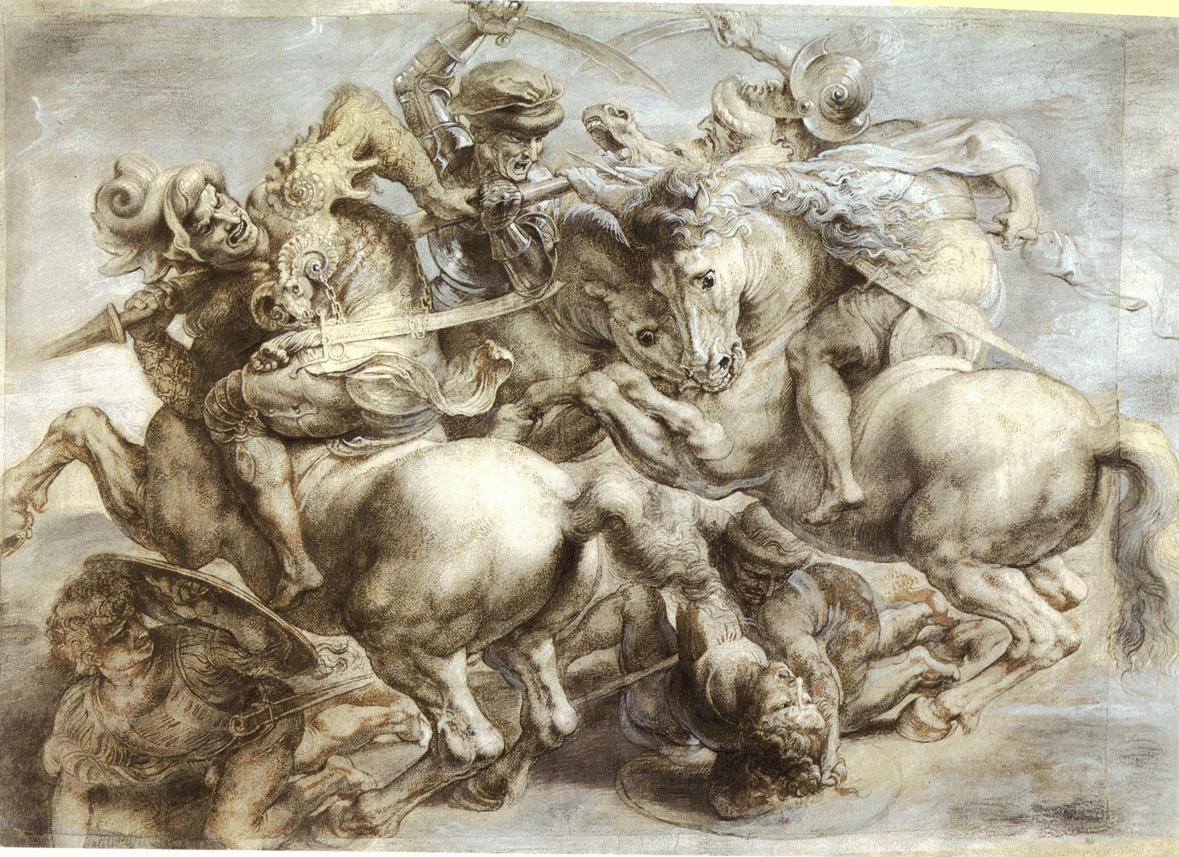
Copy of The Battle of Anghiari made in the 16th century and owned and extended by Rubens. Purportedly, from left to right are Francesco Piccinino, Niccolò Piccinino, Ludovico Trevisan and Giovanni Antonio Del Balzo Orsini.

The Battle of Anghiari (Italian: La Battaglia di Anghiari, 1505) is a lost fresco painting by Leonardo da Vinci in the Salone dei Cinquecento (Hall of the Five Hundred) in the Palazzo Vecchio, Florence. Its central scene would have depicted four men riding raging war horses engaged in a struggle for possession of a standard at the Battle of Anghiari in 1440.

Leonardo never completed the commission and left the work unfinished in 1505. According to an early biographer, Leonardo had experimented working in a different fresco technique involving walnut oil but the colors were too unstable, leading the master to abandon the project. Leonardo's unfinished work remained on site for a while and was admired by many visitors and artists; it was ultimately destroyed and replaced by a new work (today, Giorgio Vasari's frescoes from 1563-65 can be seen in its place).

Many preparatory studies by Leonardo still exist. The composition of the central section is best known through a drawing which was made in the 16th century and later acquired by Peter Paul Rubens who extended the edges of the drawing. The drawing is in the collection of the Louvre in Paris, where it is referred to as The Battle of the Standard. This drawing succeeds in portraying the fury, the intense emotions and the sense of power that were presumably present in the original painting. Similarities have been noted between this Battle of Anghiari and the Hippopotamus Hunt painted by Rubens in 1616.

In March 2012, a team led by Maurizio Seracini announced that they had found evidence that the painting still exists on a hidden inner wall behind a cavity, underneath a section of Giorgio Vasari's fresco in the chamber. The search was discontinued in September 2012, without any further progress having been made, due to conflict among the involved parties.

In 2020, a group of art historians submitted the findings of their research on the work. Their conclusion was that the work had never been commenced or executed because Leonardo could not have created the painting as his proposed gesso and oil technique for making the layer for the painting would not have allowed the paint to attach to the wall.

== History ==
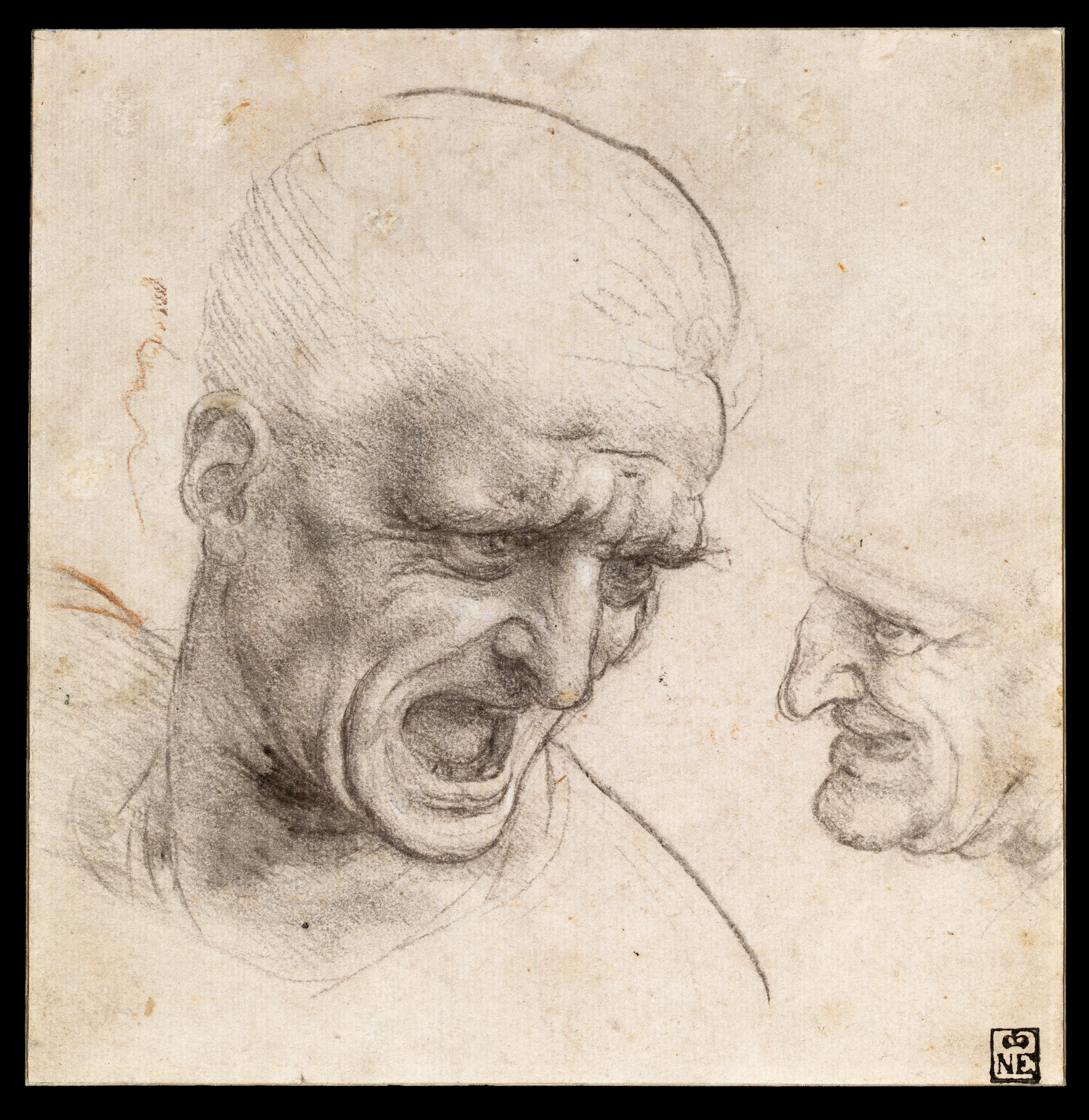
Study of Two Warriors’ Heads for The Battle of Anghiari (c. 1504–5). Black chalk or charcoal, some traces of red chalk on paper, 19.1 × 18.8 cm. Museum of Fine Arts, Budapest

In 1504 Leonardo da Vinci was given the commission by gonfaloniere Piero Soderini, a contract signed by Niccolò Machiavelli, to decorate the Palazzo Vecchio's Salone dei Cinquecento (Hall of the Five Hundred). At the same time his rival Michelangelo, who had just finished his David, was assigned the opposite wall. This was the only time that Leonardo da Vinci and Michelangelo worked together on the same project; the proximity of their respective works intensified their rivalry. The painting of Michelangelo depicted an episode from the Battle of Cascina, when a group of bathing soldiers was surprised by the enemy. However Michelangelo did not stay in Florence long enough to complete the project. He was able to finish his cartoon, but only began the painting. He was invited back to Rome in 1505 by the newly appointed Pope Julius II and was commissioned to build the Pope's tomb.

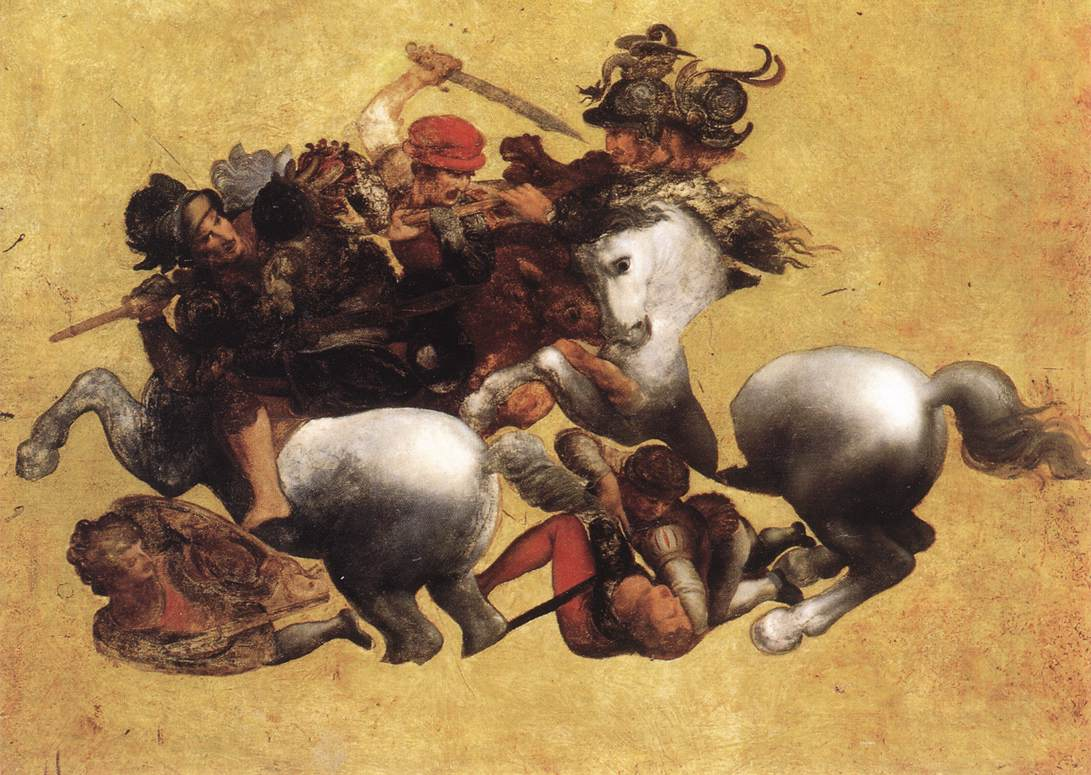
A copy possibly made from the original incomplete work (c. 1504–5)

Leonardo da Vinci drew his large cartoon in the Basilica of Santa Maria Novella, on the east wall, depicting a scene from the life of Niccolò Piccinino, a condottiere in the service of Duke Filippo Maria Visconti of Milan. He drew a scene of a violent clash of horses and a furious battle of men fighting for the flag in the Battle of Anghiari. Giorgio Vasari in his book Lives of the Most Excellent Painters, Sculptors, and Architects praised the magisterial way in which Leonardo had put this scene on paper:

It would be impossible to express the inventiveness of Leonardo's design for the soldiers' uniforms, which he sketched in all their variety, or the crests of the helmets and other ornaments, not to mention the incredible skill he demonstrated in the shape and features of the horses, which Leonardo, better than any other master, created with their boldness, muscles and graceful beauty.

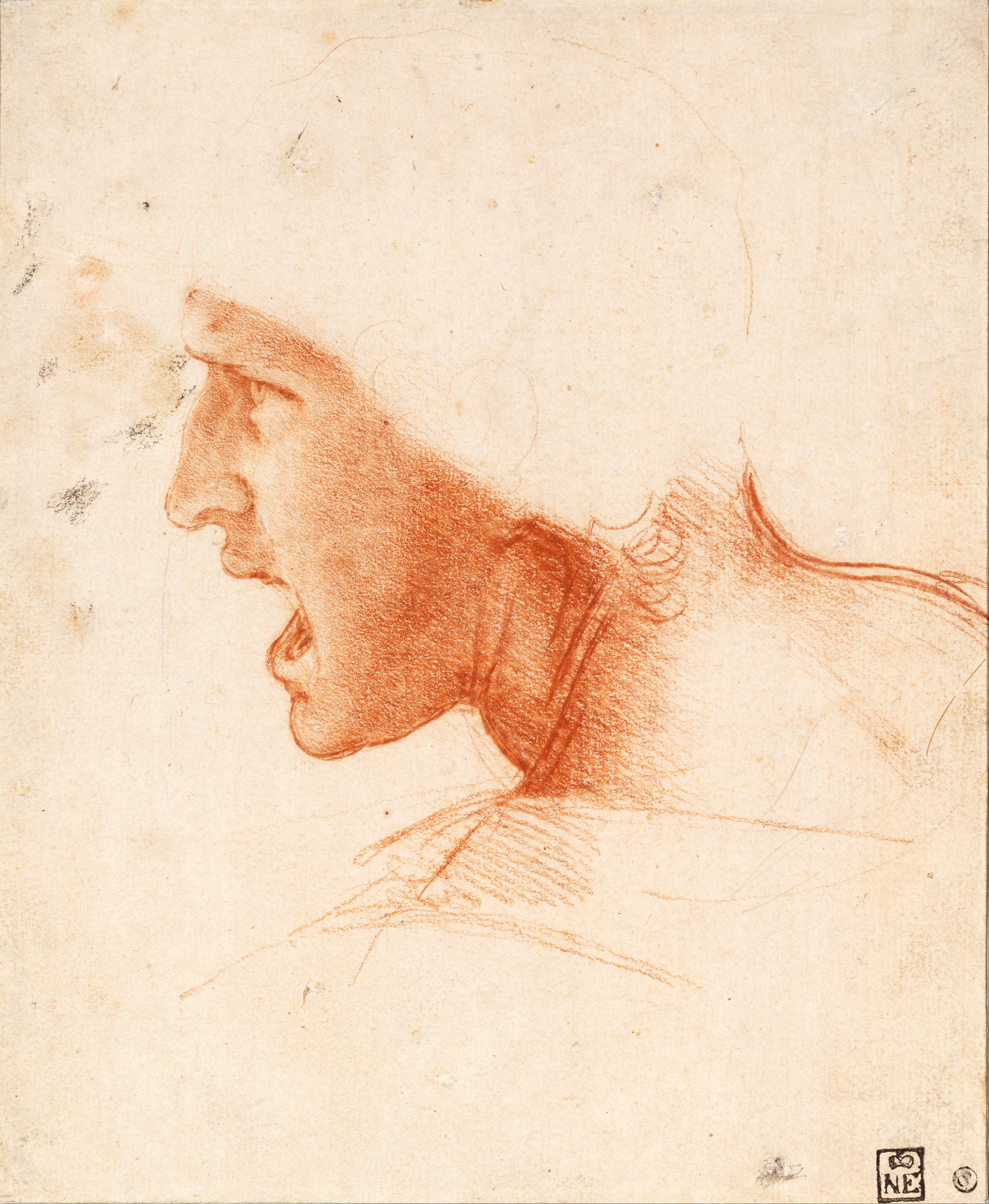
Study of a Warrior’s Head for the Battle of Anghiari. Red chalk on very pale pink prepared paper, 22.6 × 18.6 cm. Museum of Fine Arts, Budapest

Leonardo built an ingenious scaffold in the Hall of Five Hundred that could be raised or folded in the manner of an accordion. This painting was to be his largest and most substantial work. Since he had a bad experience with fresco painting (The Last Supper; refectory of Santa Maria delle Grazie, Milan), he wanted to apply oil colours on the wall. He began also to experiment with such a thick undercoat (possibly mingled with wax), that after he applied the colours, the paint began to drip. Trying to dry the painting in a hurry and save whatever he could, he hung large charcoal braziers close to the painting. Only the lower part could be saved in an intact state; the upper part couldn't dry fast enough and the colours intermingled. Leonardo then abandoned the project.

Michelangelo's and Leonardo's unfinished paintings adorned the same room together for almost a decade (1505–1512). The cartoon of Michelangelo's painting was cut in pieces by Bartolommeo Bandinelli out of envy in 1512. The centerpiece of The Battle of Anghiari was greatly admired and numerous copies were made for decades.

== Reconstruction of room ==
During the mid-16th century (1555–1572), the hall was enlarged and restructured by Vasari and his helpers on the instructions of Cosimo I, in order that the Duke could hold court in this important chamber of the palace. In the course of the renovations, the remnants of famous (but unfinished) artworks from the previous plan of decoration for the hall, were lost; including The Battle of Cascina by Michelangelo and The Battle of Anghiari by Leonardo da Vinci.

Vasari himself painted new frescoes on the now-extended walls. On the walls are large and expansive frescoes that depict battles and military victories by Florence over Pisa and Siena :

- The Taking of Siena
- The Conquest of Porto Ercole
- The Victory of Cosimo I at Marciano in Val di Chiana
- Defeat of the Pisans at the Tower of San Vincenzo
- Maximillian of Austria Attempts the Conquest of Leghorn
- Pisa Attacked by the Florentine Troops

== Possible rediscovery ==
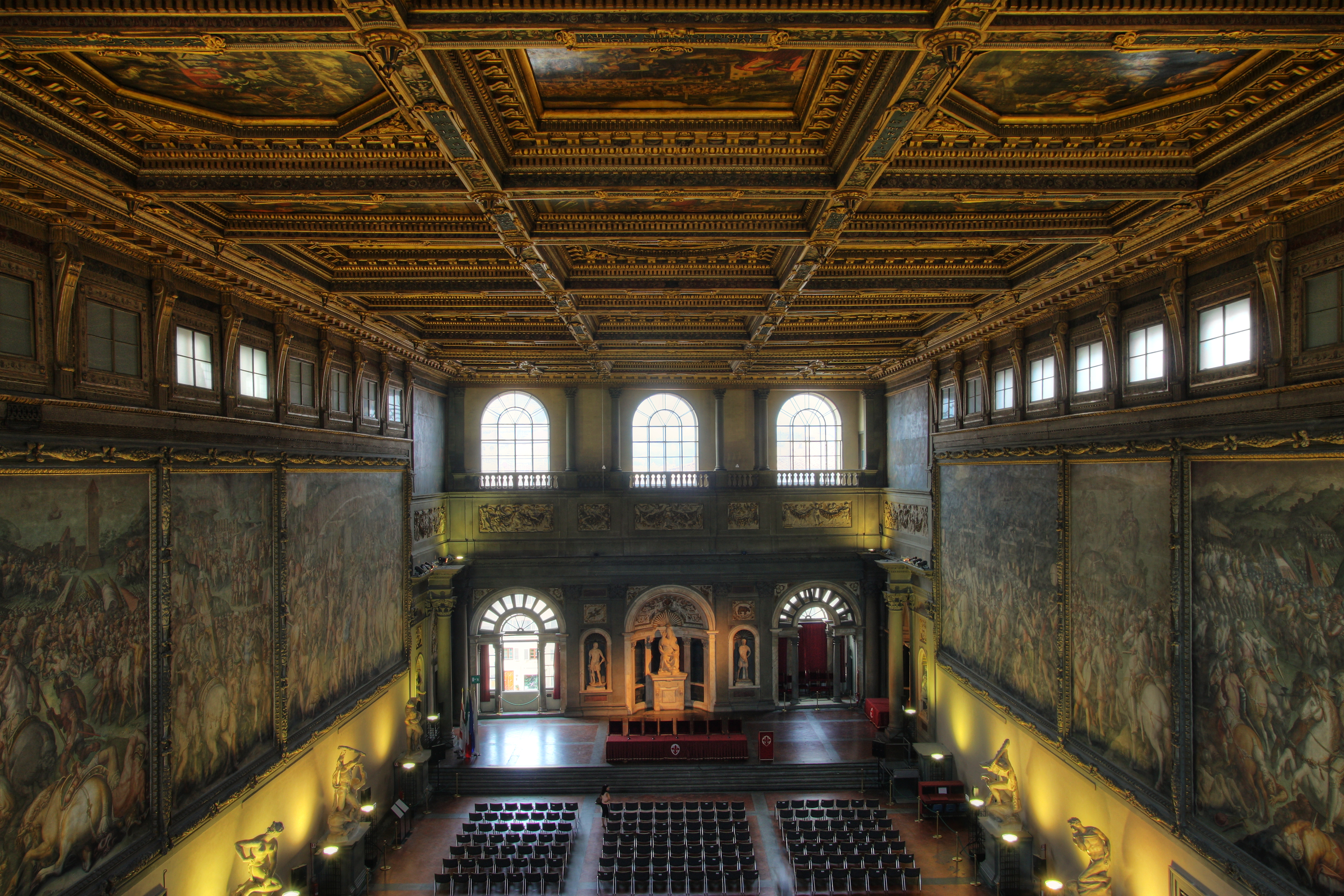
Palazzo Vecchio, where it is believed the painting may be concealed

Maurizio Seracini, an Italian expert in high-technology art analysis, believes that Leonardo's Anghiari is hidden behind Vasari's Battle of Marciano in Val di Chiana (1572). In the upper part of Vasari's fresco, 12 meters above the ground, a Florentine soldier waves a green flag with the words "Cerca trova" ('He who seeks, finds'). These enigmatic words are suggested to be a hint from Vasari, who had praised The Battle of Anghiari highly in his writings, incomplete and damaged as it was. Seracini believes it is unlikely that Vasari would have willingly destroyed Leonardo's work. Vasari's concealment and preservation of another painting, Masaccio's Holy Trinity, during a subsequent renovation project also assigned to him by Cosimo I, is cited as precedent.

Using non-invasive techniques, such as a high-frequency, surface-penetrating radar and a thermographic camera, Seracini made a survey of the hall. Among other findings, he discovered that Vasari had built a curtain wall in front of the original east wall, and painted his fresco on the new wall. Seracini believes the original fresco of Leonardo da Vinci to be located on the older wall, beneath it. Sensors found a gap of 1 to 3 centimeters between the two walls, large enough for the older fresco to be preserved.

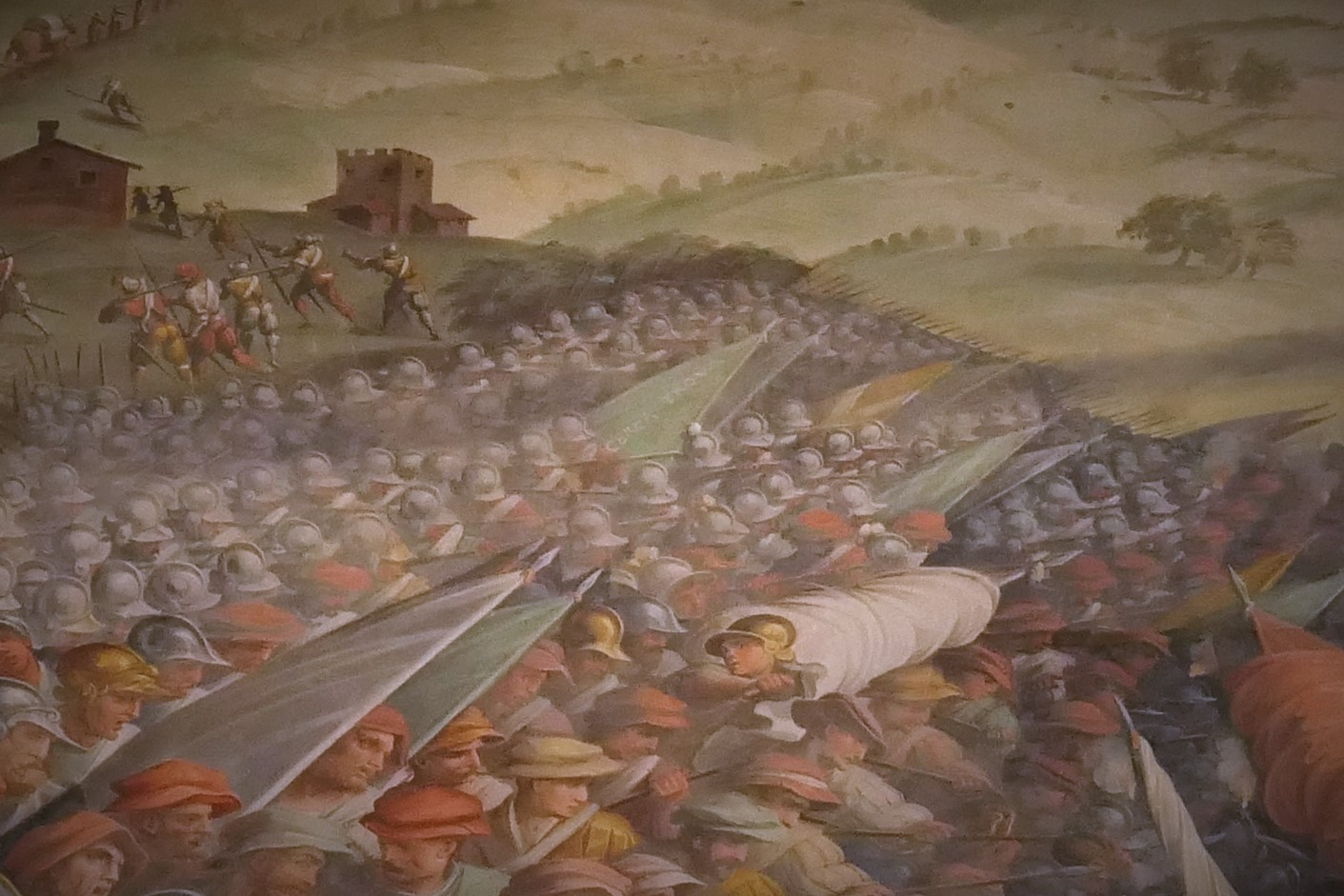
Upper section in Vasari's painting, Battle of Marciano in Val di Chiana, showing the banner inscribed with the words "CERCA TROVA"

In early 2007, the city council of Florence and the Italian Minister of Culture approved further investigation. After unsuccessful attempts to fund the development of a more advanced non-invasive scanning system, in December 2011 Seracini and his associates drilled small holes through areas of the Vasari fresco believed to have been previously damaged and restored, hence no longer comprising "original paint" from Vasari's work. An endoscopic probe with a camera was extended into the cavity behind the curtain wall, and the team discovered fragments of pigment and indications of fresco surfacing on the plaster of the inner wall; samples were taken at the time, with the results being announced publicly on 12 March 2012. Seracini believes that this is conclusive evidence for the continued existence of Leonardo's fresco. Seracini's research is highly controversial with strong criticism being levelled against him for drilling the holes. In March 2012 researchers said "the material found behind the Vasari wall shows a chemical composition similar to black pigment found in brown glazes on Leonardo's Mona Lisa and St. John the Baptist, identified in a recently published scientific paper by the Louvre, which analyzed all the da Vinci paintings in its collection."

In mid-2012, efforts to investigate the cavity behind Vasari's fresco were discontinued, due to the conflicting views of interested parties, as to whether and how to proceed.

Alfonso Musci and Alessandro Savorelli published an article in the journal of the Italian Institute of Renaissance Studies at Palazzo Strozzi in December 2012, disputing Seracini's interpretation of the motto on the green flag in Vasari's mural. In the article they attempted to investigate the writing “CERCA TROVA” in the context of the real events that occurred during the Battle of Scannagallo (1554) and made known through the works of Bernardo Segni, Antonio Ramirez de Montalvo, Domenico Moreni.

These works contain detailed descriptions of anti-Medicean heraldic insignia present in Marciano della Chiana, including eight green flags embroidered with the verse of Dante: "Libertà va cercando, ch'è sì cara, ch'è sì cara come sa chi per lei vita rifiuta" (Purgatorio, vv. 70–7) and the ancient coat of arms "Libertas" in golden. These banners had been delivered by Henry II of France to the troops of the Florentine exiles, armed by the Republican banker Bindo Altoviti and led by Piero Strozzi and Giambattista Altoviti. After the defeat of the Republicans and of the French troops, these green flags would have become spoils of the winners, and handed over to Grand Duke Cosimo I. They would have been publicly displayed in the central nave of the Basilica of San Lorenzo.

Following the theme of luck and damnation of the oldest Florentine 'stemma' (Libertas) in the cycle of paintings conceived by Cosimo I and Vincenzo Borghini in the Salone dei Cinquecento, Musci and Savorelli suggest that the motto "CERCA TROVA" was an allusion to the verse of Dante and to the fate of the Republicans ("searching freedom and finding death"), and thereby dispute Seracini's interpretation of the green flag as a hint left by Vasari.

In October 2020, a group of art historians concluded that the painting had never been executed on the basis that Leonardo failed to invent a technique for it, which would have included a layer of gesso and oil. Seracini has not accepted their conclusions.

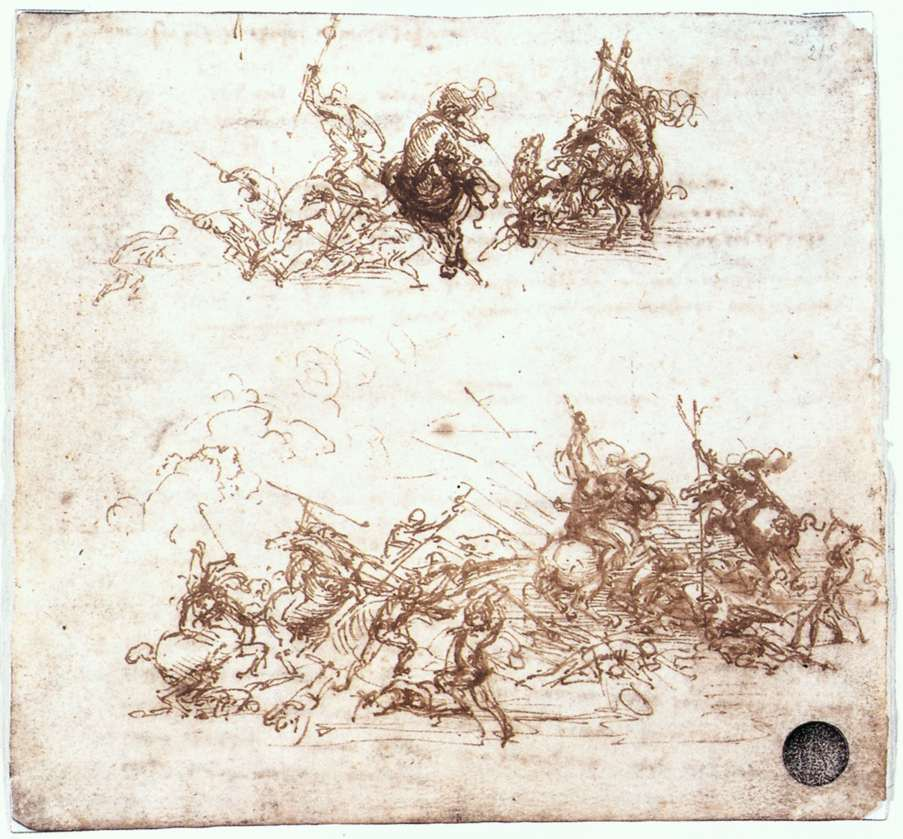
Study of battles on Horseback and foot by Leonardo

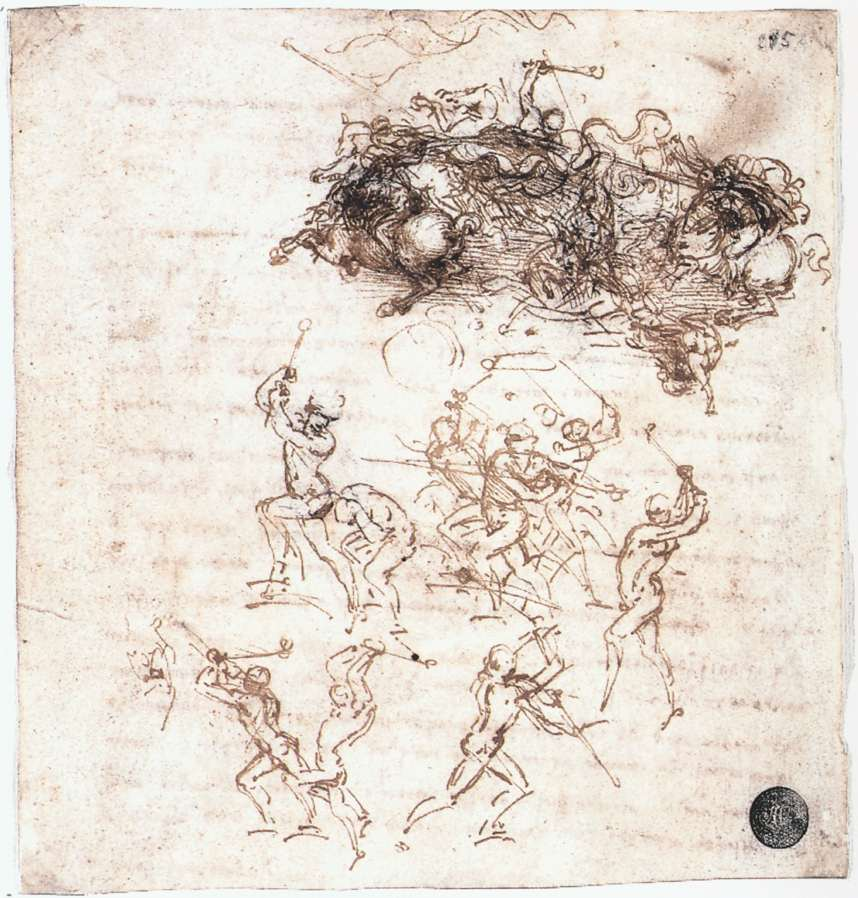
Study of battles on Horseback and foot by Leonardo {apparent sketch for Battle of The Standard at top right

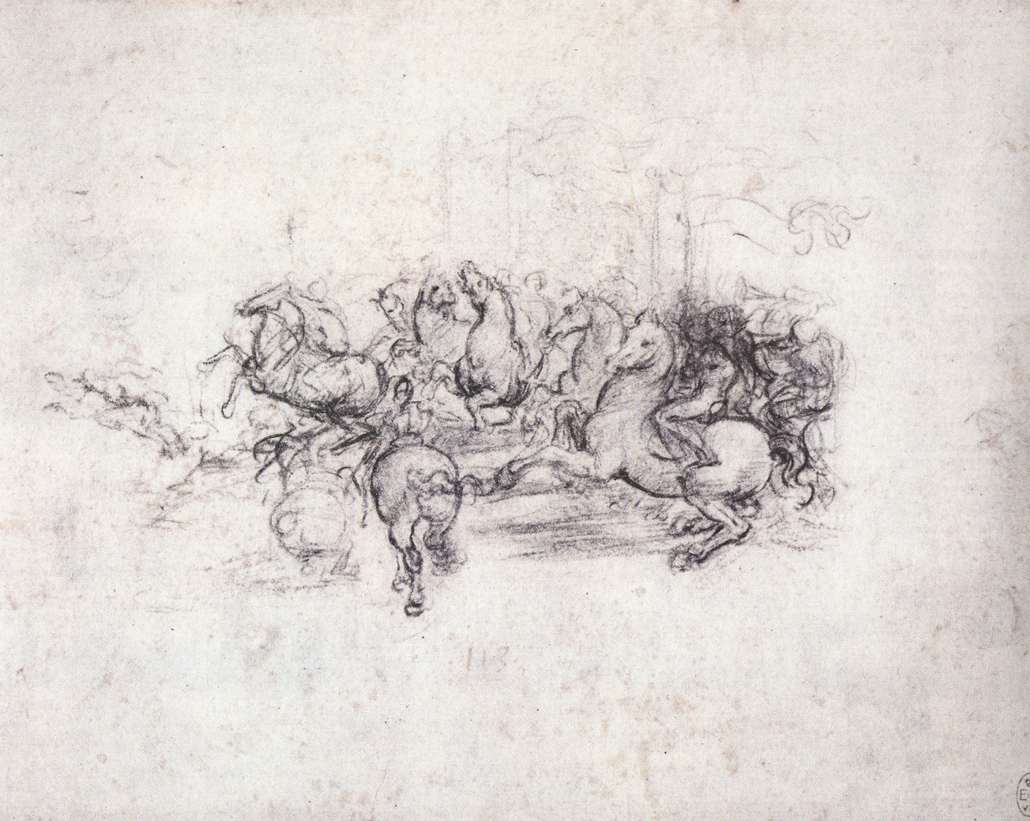
Group of riders in the Battle of Anghiari by Leonardo

== See also ==
- List of works by Leonardo da Vinci
