= Maurizio Seracini =

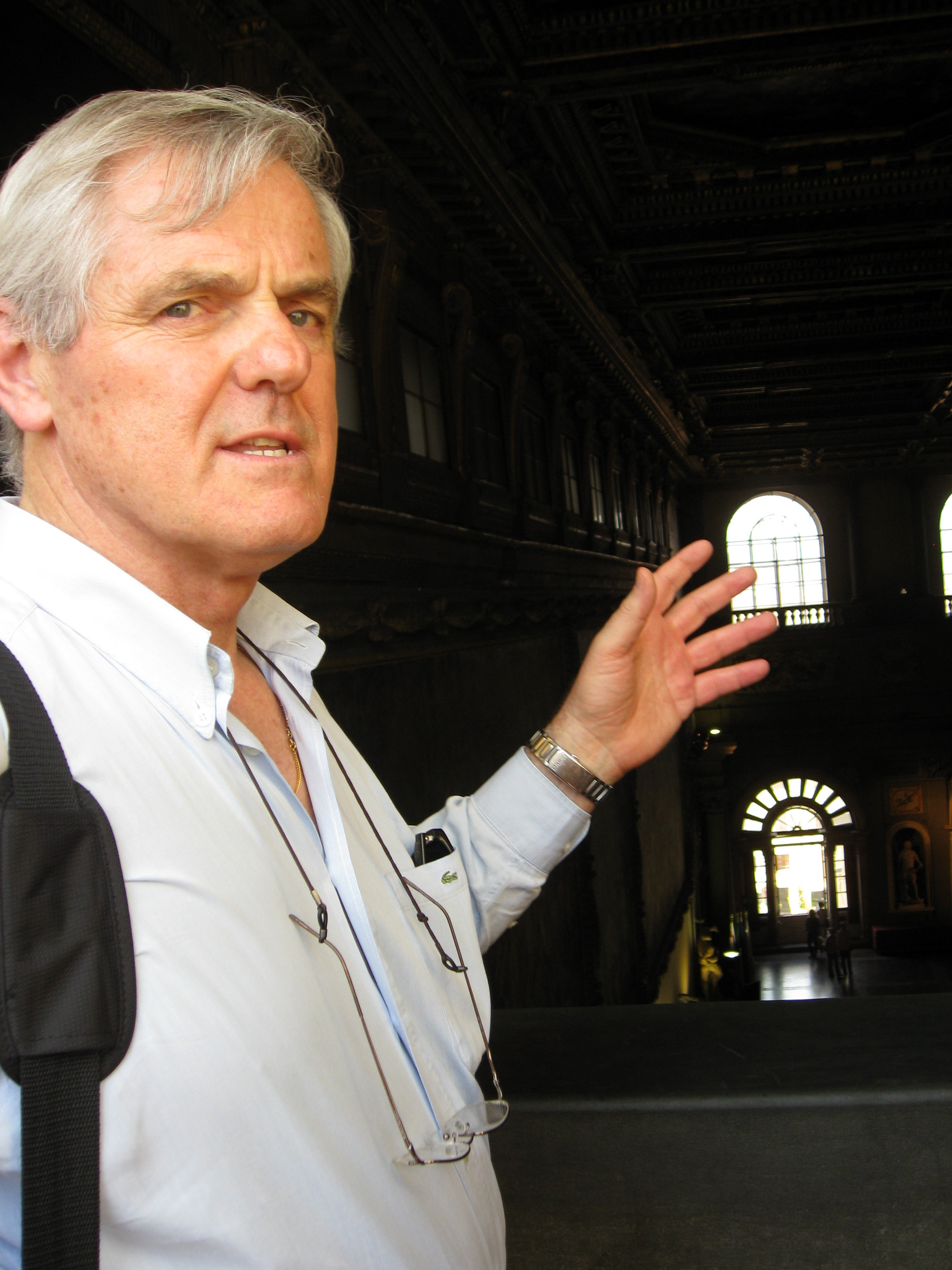
Maurizio Seracini at Palazzo Vecchio in Florence, Italy

Maurizio Seracini (born 16 December 1946) is an Italian engineer and art diagnostician known for applying scientific imaging and engineering technologies to the study, authentication, and conservation of artworks. He is the founder of Editech, a Florence-based center for the scientific analysis of cultural heritage, and is widely known for his long-running investigation into Leonardo da Vinci's lost mural The Battle of Anghiari.

== Career ==
Seracini studied engineering at the University of California, San Diego, where he later specialized in the application of scientific methods to the analysis of cultural heritage. He adapted technologies from medical and military fields, as well as other technical measuring instruments, to aid in the diagnostics and search of art without destroying the artwork itself.

In 2007, Seracini founded the Center for Interdisciplinary Science for Art, Architecture and Archaeology (now known as the Cultural Heritage Engineering Initiative (CHEI)) at the University of California, San Diego's Institute for Telecommunications and Information Technology (Calit2). He served as its director until 2013. From 2014 to 2016, he was a visiting professor at the School of Engineering at Monash University, Melbourne.

Seracini has studied over 4,300 works of art, including Leonardo da Vinci's The Last Supper, Sandro Botticelli's Allegory of Spring, and Caravaggio's Medusa. He is particularly known for his search for the Leonardo da Vinci mural The Battle of Anghiari in the Salone dei Cinquecento, Palazzo Vecchio, Florence, which has been the subject of significant controversy within the art community. In 2012, he reported that he had located the mural behind Giorgio Vasari's Battle of Marciano in Val di Chiana using high-frequency, surface-penetrating radar. While Seracini's theory was confirmed by an investigation authorized by the city council of Florence and the Italian Minister of Culture at the time, later evidence against the continued existence of this mural was presented by 25 interdisciplinary experts, whose findings were published in 2018.

Seracini is also notable for his multi-spectral diagnostic work on Leonardo's Adoration of the Magi which informed major restoration treatments carried out in 2016 by the Opificio delle pietre dure.

Since 2018, Seracini has been collaborating with art investment entities in the Middle East, including Majestic Arts based in Dubai.
