= List of Italian women artists =

This is a list of women artists who were born in Italy or whose artworks are closely associated with that country.

== A ==
- Carla Accardi (1924–2014), abstractionist painter
- Eleonora Aguiari (born 1973), installation artist
- Angelica Veronica Airola (c.1590–1670), Baroque painter
- Quirina Alippi-Fabretti (1849–1919), painter
- Topazia Alliata (1913–2015), painter, writer
- Edina Altara (1898–1983), illustrator, decorator and fashion designer
- Giulia Andreani (born 1985), history painter
- Amalia de Angelis (fl. 1851–1871), painter
- Elena Anguissola (c.1532–1584), painter and nun
- Lucia Anguissola (c.1538–c.1565), painter
- Sofonisba Anguissola (c.1532–1625), Renaissance painter
- Anna Maria Arduino (1633–1700), 17th century painter and writer and the Princess of Piombino from Messina, Sicily
- Simona Atzori (born 1974), painter and dancer born without arms

== B ==
- Pippa Bacca (1974–2008), artist
- Bianca Bagnarelli (born 1988), Italian-French illustrator, writer
- Maria Maddalena Baldacci (1718–1782), painter
- Rosa Barba (born 1972), installation artist
- Helena Barbagelata (born 1991), artist
- Eleonora Bargili (18th century), pastellist
- Letizia Battaglia (1935–2022), photographer
- Vanessa Beecroft (born 1969), contemporary artist
- Aniella di Beltrano (1613–1649), Baroque painter
- Elisabetta Benato-Beltrami (1813–1888), painter, sculptor
- Daniela Benedini (born 1972), contemporary painter
- Mirella Bentivoglio (1922–2017), sculptor, poet, performance artist
- Laura Bernasconi (fl.1674), Baroque painter
- Rosalba Bernini (1762–1829), pastellist
- Antonia Bertucci-Pinelli (died c.1640), Baroque painter
- Carlotta de Bevilacqua (born 1957), lighting designer
- Rossella Biscotti (born 1978), visual artist, video maker
- Ernesta Legnani Bisi (1788–1859), painter and engraver
- Fulvia Bisi (1818–1911), painter
- Rita Boley Bolaffio (1898–1995), collage artist
- Clelia Bompiani (1848–1927), painter
- Monica Bonvicini (born 1965), sculptor, photographer, video artist, educator
- Giuseppina Quaglia Borghese (1765–1831), painter and pastellist
- Erma Bossi (1875–1952), painter
- Luigia Bozzini (19th century), religious painter
- Faustina Bracci Armellini (1785–1857), pastellist
- Antonietta Brandeis (1848–1926), painter
- Nina Breeder (born 1982), contemporary artist
- Plautilla Bricci (1616–1690), architect, painter
- Fatma Bucak (born 1984), contemporary artist
- Eufrasia Burlamacchi (1482–1548), manuscript illuminator
- Angiola Guglielma Butteri (died 1676), nun, painter

== C ==
- Orsola Maddalena Caccia (1596–1676), nun, religious painter
- Margherita Caffi (1650–1710), flower painter
- Maria Callani (1778–1803), 18th century portrait painter, active in Parma.
- Suor Prudenza Cambi (died 1601), painter and nun
- Milena Canonero (born 1946), costume designer
- Ginevra Cantofoli (c.1608/1618–1672), Baroque painter
- Sister Luisa Capomazza (c.1600–1646), painter
- Benedetta Cappa (1897–1977), futurist artist
- Antonella Cappuccio (born 1944), costume designer
- Ghitta Carell (1899–1972), Hungarian-born Italian photographer
- Shola Carletti (fl. 21st century), painter and sculptor, active in India
- Marianna Carlevarijs (1703–1750), painter and pastellist
- Rosalba Carriera (1673–1757), painter
- Maria Vittoria Cassana (died 1711), painter
- Caterina Amigoni Castellini (18th century), pastellist
- Beatrice Catanzaro (born 1975), conceptual artist
- Catherine of Bologna (1413–1463), nun, artist, saint
- Nicoletta Ceccoli (born 1973), Sammarinese illustrator
- Giulia Centurelli (1832–1872), painter and poet
- Maria Suppioti Ceroni (1730–c.1773), pastellist
- Vittoria Chierici (born 1955), painter
- Caterina Cherubini (died 1811), miniaturist
- Amalia Ciardi Dupré (1934–2024), sculptor and painter
- Emma Ciardi (1879–1933), painter
- Barbara Ciardo (born 1983), comic book colorist
- Vittoria Cocito (1891–1971), painter and illustrator
- Marina Cicogna (1934–2023), film producer and photographer
- Maria Giovanna Clementi (1692–1761), portrait painter
- Daniela Comani (born 1965), multimedia artist
- Theresa Maria Coriolano (1620–1671), engraver
- Maddalena Corvina (1607–1664), painter and engraver
- Liliana Cossovel (1924–1984), painter, collagist
- Maria Cosway (1760–1838), Italian-English painter
- Mariangiola Criscuolo (c.1548–1630), Renaissance painter
- Maria Eufrasia della Croce (1597–1676), nun, painter

== D ==
- Dadamaino (1930–2004), painter
- Isabella Maria dal Pozzo (fl. 1660s), painter
- Teodora Danti (c.1498–c.1573), painter, writer
- Caterina Davinio (born 1957), poet, novelist, new media artist
- Elena de' Grimani (born 1975), comic book artist and illustrator
- Lotus de Païni (1862–1953) painter, writer, sculptor, and occultist
- Yvonne De Rosa (born 1975), photographer
- Marianna Candidi Dionigi (1756–1826), painter and writer
- Anna Vittoria Dolara (1754–1827), nun, poet, painter
- Agnese Dolci (1635–1686), painter
- Valentina D'Urbano (born 1985), writer and illustrator
- Irene Parenti Duclos (1754–1795), painter, poet
- Amalia Ciardi Dupré (1934–2024), sculptor, painter

== F ==
- Adriana Bisi Fabbri (1881–1918), painter
- Orsola Faccioli (1823–1906), painter
- Lucrina Fetti (c.1590–1651), painter
- Teresa Fioroni-Voigt (1799–1880), painter of miniatures
- Eva Fischer (1920–2015), Croatian-born Italian painter and engraver
- Lavinia Fontana (1552–1614), early professional painter
- Giovanna Fratellini (1666–1731), Baroque painter
- Chiara Fumai (1979–2017)
- Virginia von Fürstenberg (1974–2023), fashion designer

== G ==
- Margarita Gabassi (mid-18th century), painter
- Anna Galeotti (1739–1773), engraver, painter
- Fede Galizia (1578–1630), pioneering still life Renaissance painter
- Federica Galli (1932–2009), printmaker
- Giola Gandini (1906–1941), painter
- Giovanna Garzoni (1600–1670), Baroque painter
- Francesca Genna (born 1967), printmaker
- Artemisia Gentileschi (1593–c.1656), Baroque painter
- Costanza Ghilini (1754–1775), amateur painter and pastellist
- Caterina Ginnasi (1590–1660), Baroque painter
- Domiziana Giordano (born 1959), painter, actress, photographer and video artist
- Sofia Giordano (1778–1829), painter
- Gisella Giovenco (born 1946), painter and stylist
- Francesca Grilli (born 1978), visual artist, video maker
- Beatrice Ancillotti Goretti (1879–1937), painter
- Camilla Guerrieri (1628–after 1693), court painter
- Rosina Mantovani Gutti (1851–1943), painter, especially of children

== H ==
- Domitilla Harding (fl. late 20th, early 21st century), furniture and fashion designer, also works with glass
- Adelita Husni-Bey (born 1985), visual artist, video maker

== I ==
- Iaia (116–27 BC), Roman painter, engraver

== K ==
- Elisabetta Keller (1891–1969), Italian-born Swiss painter and pastellist
- Kiyohara Tama (1861–1939), Japanese painter active in Sicily
- Elisa Koch (1833–1914), painter, pastellist

== L ==
- Giulia Lama (1681–1747), painter
- Luisa Lambri (born 1969), photographer
- Ketty La Rocca (1938–1976), poet, visual artist
- Carla Lavatelli (1928–2006), portrait painter, abstract sculptor
- Bice Lazzari (1900–1981), painter
- Angelica Le Gru Perotti (1719–1776), painter
- Vittoria Ligari (1713–1783), painter
- Maria Cattarina Locatelli (died 1723), painter
- Barbara Longhi (1552–1638), painter

== M ==
- Ortensia Poncarale Maggi (1732–1811), painter
- Francesca Magliani (born 1845), painter
- Lilla Maldura (fl. 1876–1887), painter
- Matilde Malenchini (1779–1858), portrait and genre painter
- Ada Mangilli (1863–1935), painter
- Anna Morandi Manzolini (1714–1774), anatomist, wax modeler
- Faustina Maratti (c.1679–1745), Baroque poet, painter
- Elisabetta Marchioni (fl. 1700), Venetian painter
- Clementina Marcovigi (1863–1887), painter
- Virginia Mariani (1824–1898), painter, ceramist
- Maria Martinetti (1864–1921), painter
- Luigia Massari (1810–1898), painter, embroiderer
- Giulia Masucci Fava (born 1858), painter
- Isabella Discalzi Mazzoni (fl. late 15th century), sculptor
- Margherita Pavesi Mazzoni (1930–2010), painter, sculptor and poet
- Carla Carli Mazzucato (born 1935), contemporary artist
- Marisa Merz (1931–2019), sculptor
- Giovanna Tacconi Messini (1717–1742), painter
- Madonna Fitta de Milano (17th century), painter
- Ottonella Mocellin (born 1966), photographer and video artist
- Tina Modotti (1896–1942), photographer, model and actress
- Maria Molin (18th century), pastellist
- Eleonora Monti (1727–1760), painter
- Sandra Moreschi (born 1946), designer of Jewish ceremonial art
- Emma Moretto (19th century), painter
- Marisa Mori (1900–1985), Futurist painter and printmaker
- Valentina Murabito (born 1981), photographer, visual artist

== N ==
- Olga Napoli (1903–1955), painter
- Maria Giacomina Nazari (born 1724), painter
- Plautilla Nelli (1524–1588), nun, early female Renaissance painter
- Dianora Niccolini (born 1936), photographer
- Elena Nobili (1833–1900), figure painter
- Lila De Nobili (1916–2002), stage designer, costume designer and fashion illustrator
- Teresa Boccardi Nuytz (died 1837), pastellist

== O ==
- Virginia Oldoini (1837–1899), photographer
- Maria Ormani (1428–c.1470), manuscript illustrator and nun
- Giuseppina Osenga (19th-century), painter
- Valentina Guidi Ottobri (artist) (born 1988), artist, curator

== P ==
- Arcangela Paladini (1599–1622), painter
- Isabella Parasole (c.1570–c.1620), wood engraver
- Luigia Pascoli (1805–1882), painter
- Francesca Pasquali (born 1980), painter
- Rosalba Pedrina (born 1944), painter and teacher
- Itala Pellegrino (born 1865), painter
- Cinzia Pellin (born 1973), artist
- Lida Persili (19th century), painter
- Anna Bacherini Piattoli (1720–1788), painter
- Fanny Pieroni-Davenport (late 19th century), painter
- Isabella Piccini (1664–1732), engraver
- Sara Pichelli (born 1983), comics artist
- Margherita Pillini (late 19th century), painter
- Ida Pinto-Sezzi (born 1852), painter
- Laura Piranesi (1755–1790), engraver
- Paola Pivi (born 1971), multimedia artist
- Teresa del Po (1649–1716), painter
- Amalia Del Ponte (born 1936), multidisciplinary artist
- Carlotta Ida Popert (1848–1923), German-Italian painter, etcher
- Isabella Maria dal Pozzo (died 1700), painter

== R ==
- Rabarama (born 1969), contemporary artist
- Baroness Annetta Radovska (19th century), painter
- Suor Barbara Ragnoni (1448–1533), nun, painter
- Elvira Raimondi (1866–1920), painter
- Carol Rama (1918–2015), painter
- Maria Angelica Razzi (16th century), nun, sculptor
- Emma Gaggiotti Richards (1825–1912), painter
- Elisa Rigutini Bulle (born 1859), painter
- Marietta Robusti (c.1560–1590), Renaissance painter
- Linda Rocchi (born 1857), painter
- Francesca Rognoni-Gratognini (1850–1938), landscape painter
- Juana Romani (1869–1924), painter
- Lalla Romano (1906–2001), novelist, poet, painter and journalist
- Paola Romano (1951–2021), painter and sculptor
- Valentina Romeo (born 1977), cartoonist, illustrator
- Diana de Rosa (1602–1643), painter
- Vicenza Giovanna Rovisi (1750–1824), late Baroque and Neoclassical painter

== S ==
- Marina Sagona (born 1967), Italian-American artist
- Chiara Samugheo (1935–2022), photographer
- Felicità Sartori (c.1714–1760), painter and pastellist
- Beatrice Scaccia (born 1978), painter
- Maria Domenica Scanferla (1726–1763), painter and pastellist
- Teresa Scannabecchi (1662–1708), Baroque painter
- Lucrezia Scarfaglia (fl. 1677), painter
- Ida Botti Scifoni (1812–1844), painter, sculptor and designer
- Diana Scultori (1535–1612), engraver
- Marinella Senatore (born 1977), visual artist
- Floria Sigismondi (born 1965), Italian-Canadian photographer
- Luisa Silei (1825–1898), landscape painter
- Roberta Silva (born 1971), Trinidad and Tobago-born contemporary artist
- Nerina Simi (1890–1987), painter, art teacher
- Elisabetta Sirani (1638–1665), Baroque painter
- Violante Beatrice Siries (1709–1783), painter
- Maria Spanò (born 1843), painter
- Irene di Spilimbergo (1540–1559), Renaissance painter
- Chiara Spinelli (1744–1823), pastellist
- Francesca Stuart Sindici (1858–c.1929), Spanish-Italian painter

== T ==
- Patrizia Taddei (born 1948), Italian-born Sammarinese contemporary artist
- Celeste Tanfani (fl. 1735), pastellist
- Margherita Terzi (18th century), pastellist
- Caterina Tarabotti (active 1659), Baroque painter
- Maria Felice Tibaldi (1707–1770), painter
- Grazia Toderi (born 1963), video artist and photographer
- Lucia Casalini Torelli (1677–1762), painter
- Tatiana Trouvé (born 1968), contemporary artist

== V ==
- Anna Maria Vaiani (died c.1655), engraver
- Grazia Varisco (born 1937), visual artist
- Chiara Varotari (1584–1663), Baroque painter
- Virginia Vezzi (1601–1638), painter
- Lella Vignelli (1934–2016), designer
- Lauretta Vinciarelli (1943–2011), artist, architect, educator
- Teresa Berenice Vitelli (fl. 1706–1729), painter

== W ==
- Bettina Werner (born 1965), artist working with salt

== Z ==
- Maria Zacchè (born 1933), artist specializing in pen and ink drawings
- Gentile Zanardi (late 17th century), Baroque painter
- Silvia Ziche (born 1967), comic book artist and writer
- Laura Zuccheri (born 1971), comic artist, illustrator, and painter
