= Rocchi =

Rocchi is a surname of Italian origin. Notable people with the surname include:

- Carla Rocchi, Italian politician
- Claudio Rocchi, Italian rock singer-songwriter and radio host
- Ferrante Rocchi, Italian tennis player
- Fortunato Rocchi (1822–1909), Italian painter
- Francesco De Rocchi, Italian painter
- Fulvio Rocchi, Argentine sport shooter
- Gianluca Rocchi, Italian football referee
- Giordana Rocchi, Italian artistic gymnast
- Luigi Rocchi, Italian Roman Catholic, disabled for most of his life
- Jack Rocchi, Australian footballer
- Jean-Jacques Rocchi, French footballer
- José Rocchi, Mexican footballer
- Linda Rocchi, Italian painter
- Romain Rocchi, French footballer
- Sesto Rocchi, Italian violin maker
- Tommaso Rocchi, Italian footballer
- Vincenzo Rocchi, Italian painter

== Other ==
- De Rocchi
- Stadio Enrico Rocchi, multi-use stadium in Viterbo, Italy
