= Fioroni =

Fioroni is an Italian surname. Notable people with the surname include:

- Andrea Fioroni (born 1969), Argentinian former female field hockey player
- Giovanni Andrea Fioroni (or Fiorini; 1716-1178), Italian classical composer, maestro di cappella and organist
- Giuseppe Fioroni (born 1958), Italian politician and former Minister of Public Instruction
- Michele Fioroni (born 1965), Italian male former tennis player
- Paul Fioroni (born 1976), Canadian ice hockey player
- Teresa Fioroni-Voigt (1799–1880), Italian painter
