= Scaccia (surname) =

Scaccia is an Italian surname. Notable people with the surname include:

- Angelo Scaccia, American politician
- Angelo Maria Scaccia (c. 1690–1761), Italian composer and violinist
- Beatrice Scaccia (born 1978), Italian visual artist
- Fabrizio Scaccia (born 1984), American football player
- Mario Scaccia (1919–2011), Italian actor and writer
- Mike Scaccia (1965–2012), American musician
- Mónica Lei Scaccia, Venezuelan beauty pageant contestant
- Pino Scaccia (1946–2020), pseudonym for Italian journalist Giuseppe Scaccianoce
- Sigismondo Scaccia (1564–1634), Italian legal scholar
