= Brivio (surname) =

Brivio is a surname. Notable people with the surname include:

- Antonio Brivio (1905–1995), Italian bobsledder and racing driver
- Davide Brivio (born 1988), Italian footballer
- Giuseppe Ferdinando Brivio (c. 169 – c. 1758), Italian composer, conductor, violinist and singing teacher
- Pierluigi Brivio (born 1969), Italian footballer
