= Guerrieri =

Guerrieri is an Italian surname. Notable people with the surname include:

- Ascenzio Guerrieri (died 1645), Roman Catholic prelate who served as Bishop of Castellaneta
- Esteban Guerrieri (born 1985), Argentine racing driver
- Camilla Guerrieri (1628–after 1693), Italian painter
- Gerardo Guerrieri (1920-1986), Italian film director, playwright and screenwriter
- Guido Guerrieri (born 1996), Italian footballer
- Giovanni Francesco Guerrieri (1589–1655), Italian painter
- Lorenza Guerrieri (born 1944), Italian actress
- Romolo Guerrieri (born 1931), Italian film director and screenwriter
- Taylor Guerrieri (born 1992), American professional baseball pitcher
- Veronica Guerrieri, Italian and American economist
- Vittorio Guerrieri (born 1958), Italian actor and voice actor
