= Benedini =

Benedini is a surname. Notable people with the surname include:

- Daniela Benedini (born 1972), Italian contemporary painter and decorator
- Franco Benedini (born 1978), Italian sprint canoer
