= Gurrieri =

Gurrieri is an Italian surname. Notable people with the surname include:

- Andres Gurrieri (born 1989), Argentine footballer
- Kyle Gurrieri (born 1998), American soccer player

== See also ==
- Guerrieri
