= Pieroni =

Pieroni is an Italian surname. Notable people with the surname include:

- Alessandro Pieroni (1550–1607), Italian architect and painter
- Andrea Pieroni (ethnobotanist) (born 1967), Italo-German ethnobiologist
- Ania Pieroni (born 1957), former Italian actress
- Blake Pieroni (born 1995), American competition swimmer
- Fanny Pieroni-Davenport, Italian painter
- Giovanni de Galliano Pieroni (1586–1654), Italian military engineer specializing in erecting fortifications
- Luigi Pieroni (born 1980), former Belgian football striker
- Margaret Pieroni, Australian botanical artist and botanist
