= Giuseppe Ferdinando Brivio =

Italian composer

Giuseppe Ferdinando Brivio (c. 1700, Milan – c. 1758, Milan) was an Italian composer, conductor, violinist, and singing teacher who is chiefly known for his operas. His work displays a natural expression and uses figurations similar to that of Antonio Vivaldi.

== Life and career ==
He was born in Milan. The earliest record of Brivio was in a court document indicating his position as a violinist at the Royal Palace of Milan in 1720. He soon after to become the music director at the Royal Palace's theatre, where he remained until 13 October 1732. He later returned to the theater in c.1738 and remained active there through 1742. At the Teatro Ducale, his first known opera, Ipermestra, premiered on 6 December 1727. While in Milan, he also ran an influential school of singing. Two of his notable pupils were sopranos Giulia Frasi and Caterina Visconti.

Brivio went on to write five more operas: L'Olimpiade (premiere 5 March 1737, Teatro Regio di Torino), Artaserse (premiere 2 June 1738, Teatro degli Obizzi di Padova), Merope (premiere 26 December 1738, Teatro Ducale di Milano), La Germania trionfante in Arminio (premiere 2 May 1739, Teatro Ducale di Milano) and Alessandro nell'Indie (premiere carnival 1742, Teatro Ducale di Milano). His music was also used in three Pasticcio mounted at the King's Theatre, Haymarket, London during the 1740s, Gianguir (premiere 2 November 1742), Mandane (premiere 12 December 1742), and L'incostanza delusa (premiere 9 February 1745). The final stage work to use his music was another pasticcio, L'Olimpiade, which premiered at the Teatro Marsigli-Rossi di Bologna on 10 May 1755.

Besides opera, Brivio produced a small amount of instrumental music. One of his two known violin concertos was included in a well known publication of Italian music by French parliamentarian Pierre Philibert de Blancheton, alongside composers Angelo Maria Scaccia and Carlo Zuccari.

Brivio died in Milan around 1758.
