= Antonio Brioschi =

Italian symphony composer

Antonio Brioschi (fl. c. 1725 – 1750) was an Italian symphony composer who wrote at least twenty six symphonies; most of which were preserved in the collection of Pierre Philibert de Blancheton. Brioschi was a pioneer in symphonic music in the early Classical period which traditionally starts around 1730. He appears to have been a more prolific symphonic composer during this period than even the better-known Giovanni Battista Sammartini and seems to have been active in or near Milan. The symphonic school in Milan gathered around the authoritative figure of Sammartini and included Brioschi, Ferdinando Galimberti and Giovanni Battista Lampugnani. Brioschi himself seems to have been associated with the musical life of the Jewish community in Casale Monferrato.
