= Isabella Discalzi Mazzoni =

Italian sculptor

- Known for: Terracotta figures

Isabella Discalzi Mazzoni (active late 15th century) was an Italian sculptor.

== Career ==
Mazzoni was the second wife of sculptor Guido Mazzoni. Under her husband's tutelage, she was taught the art of sculpting. She was known for her terracotta figures and was so skilled that, according to biographer Lodovico Vedriani, they often appeared to come to life under her fingers. She probably also worked in her husband's bottega, most likely as part of the workshop at their house. Stefano Ticozzi in 1830 wrote she may have traveled to Naples and France, where her husband gained artistic commissions from Charles VIII.

== Family ==
According to Lodovico Vedriani, Isabella and Guido were unable to have children. He had a daughter from his first marriage, whom they taught to sculpt. This unnamed daughter caused Vedriani to claim that the Art of Sculpting won out over the Art of Painting. She likely died young. The later painter Giulio Mazzoni was probably a relation.

== Legacy ==
Vedriani claimed that Mazzoni should be "nominated, celebrated, and consecrated for eternity" as one of the great women sculptors of her day. Nothing remains from her or her stepdaughter, not even, as Ticozzi wrote, "secure memories of those who came forth from their gentle hands".
