= Pierre Philibert de Blancheton =

Pierre Philibert de Blancheton (9 October 1697 – 6 March 1756) was a French politician and music patron and collector. From 1724 until his death 30 years later he was a member of the Parliament of Metz then in the Three Bishoprics.

Well known for his passion as a music collector, Blancheton is particularly remembered for his patronage of the Fonds Blancheton (c.1741); one of the biggest and most important collections of early 18th century instrumental music in existence. The collection contains a total of 300 works by 104 composers; most of whom were Italian composers of the early 18th century. Of particular importance in the collection are 25 symphonies by Antonio Brioschi and several early symphonies by Giovanni Battista Sammartini. Also included in the collection are overtures, sonatas, trios, and a large number of violin concertos by composers like Domenico Alberti, Giuseppe Ferdinando Brivio, Angelo Maria Scaccia, Giovanni Battista Somis, and Carlo Zuccari among others.
