= Massimilian Breeder =

Italian artist

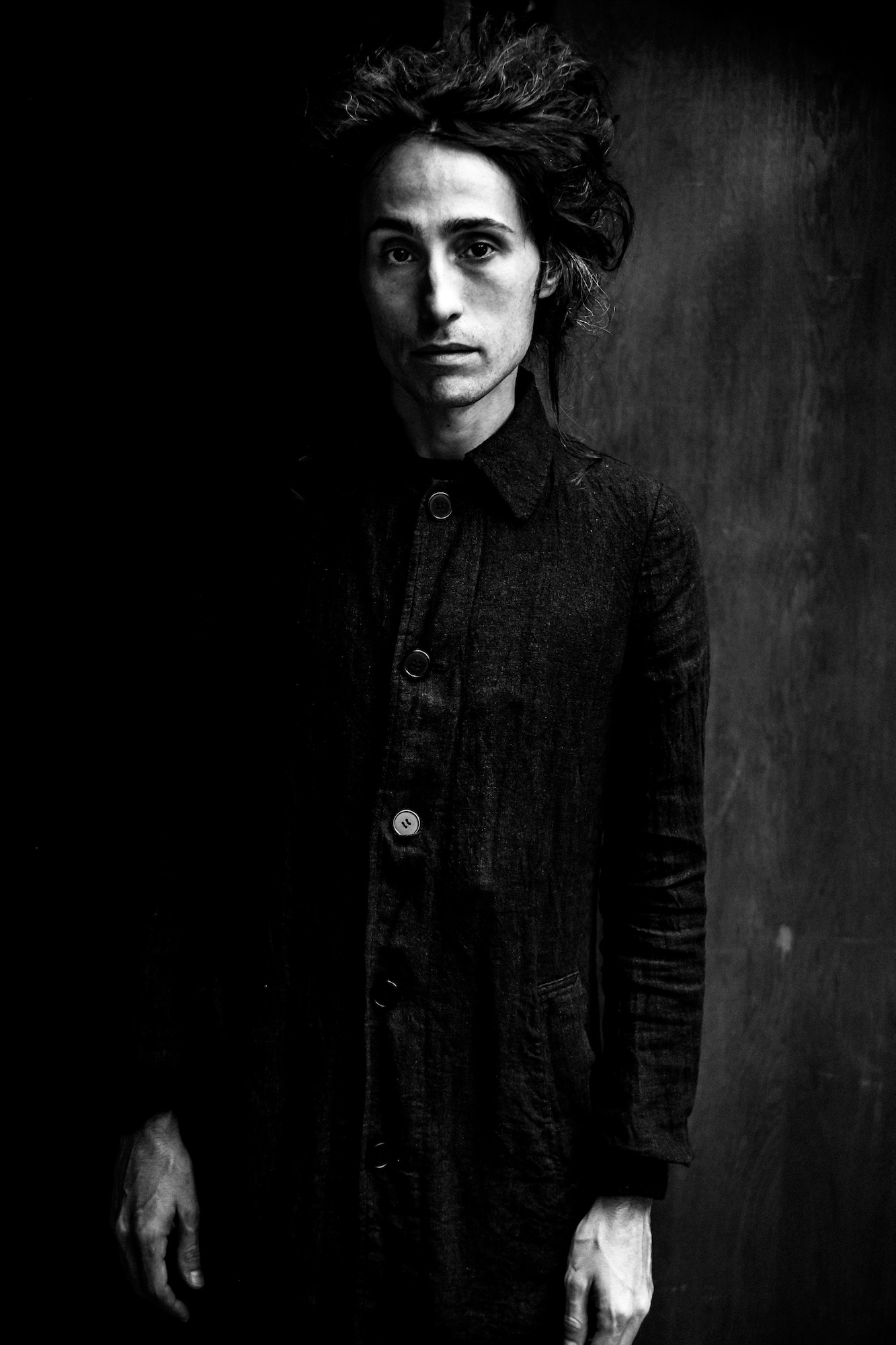
- Massimilian Breeder
- Born: June 13, 1978 (age 48); Genova, Italy
- Occupation: Filmmaker / Artist
- Relatives: Nina Breeder

Notes
- Married with Nina Breeder between 2009-2014 Father of Jimi-Roz Peretti 2022

Massimilian Breeder (born in Genova, June 13, 1978) is an Italian artist who works in film, drawings, sound and installation. He spent his childhood with his grandparents between Genova, Italy and Polperro, England. In 1992 he returned to Italy to study at the Paul Klee Institute for the Arts, followed by Neuroscience Studies at the University of Florence, where he began working on neural networks and biofeedbacks research, while developing an interest in films and sculptural installations. He presented the first model of interaction between Cinema and Neuroscience at the prestigious Hôpital de la Salpêtrière in Paris, implementing the use of biofeedback technology to modulate and change the course of the narrative structure of a film. The project was titled Amigdalae and its development characterized Mr. Breeder's fascination with moving pictures. In 2002, he graduated with a degree in Experimental Psychology and began Cinema Studies at the National Civic School of Cinema in Milan, which he would later abandon to move to New York City and work on his film projects * . Massimilian Breeder currently lives and works in USA and Europe.

== Works ==
In 1998 Mr. Breeder began working on film, sound and installation under the form of ongoing projects like Wurlitzer Repetition (Ignite Arts Center, Los Angeles 2007). His collaborations with Nina Breeder * on New Reproductive Systems, films and installations received attention from The Pompidou Museum (Paris, France), Anthology Film Archive (NYC) and Guggenheim Museum (NYC). In 2008-09 his first feature film Devil Come to Hell and Stay Where You Belong (2008)* obtained international interest and gave birth to a series of film works on the American Landscape. In his work Mr. Breeder explores elements of nature, employing narrative models from other domains, such as biology, geology, politics, characterized by concepts like restraint, fluids under pressure, violence and sexuality . In 2009, while working on a public installation "Crude Oil" in the Arabic neighborhood Darom - Tel Aviv, Mr.Breeder developed an interest in the Middle East and its endangered cultures and confines. During his extended stay in territories afflicted and transformed by ongoing conflicts, he wrote the film Reservoir, completed in late 2013. RESERVOIR*

== Selected films, TV works and exhibitions ==
2022-2023

- The Living Thing - Writer and Director - TV Travel Program, a strange and unique look into the world's most unknown and radical cultural experiences across Vietnam, Kenya, Hong Kong, Japan, and other locations full of secrets.

2021

- The Lunatic Express - Writer and Director - Film (120m, Color to Premiere in Paris, Premiering at the Tour Eiffel in Paris - France November 16, 2021) in collaboration with Solweig Rediger-Lizlow
- Resonance - Brainwaves and binaural-beats research project on the effects of sound on sleep stages - RESONANCE

2020

- RI'ZISTENS: Music Project - in collaboration with Solweig Rediger-Lizlow
- Television Author and Director - for ABC Television Jimmy Kimmel Live

2014

- Fukushima Best-Girl: Writer and Director - Wrote and Directed with ex-wife Nina Breeder.

2013

- Reservoir: Writer and Director - Feature Film, Cicala Filmworks, NoCrew - IFC, LionsGates Commission
- The Car Crashes: Institute of Contemporary Arts Singapore exhibition Theo.do.lites - curated by Kent Chan & Silke Schmickl -

2012

- The Car Crashes: 9 Films -
- Arte Channel: The Palms -

2011

- Animal Kingdom: Schinkel Pavillon curated by April Lamm -
- Fukushima Best-Girl: Short Film (Later produced to a full-length movie) Writer and Director - 2011 Japan, Sakura Films -
- Kinbaku: New York City, USA *

2010

- Winter Films: 2010 USA, Film - Appeared in Human Frames 2011, Cetre George Pompidou

2009

- Devil come to Hell and stay where You Belong: Pera Museum, Istanbul, Turkey
- Devil come to Hell and stay where you belong: Centre Georges Pompidou in Paris and Metz, France*
- Freeshout and Pecci Museum, Prato, Italy* Freeshout
- Anthology Film Archives, New York City* Anthology Film Archive

2008

- Love is a Burning thing: Full Scale Architectonic Installation, Darom Art Center, Tel Aviv (Crude Oil, Stone, 300x100)
- Artoteca, Milan, Italy
- Copenhagen International Film Festival, Official Selection* IMDb
- Gothenburg International Film Festival, Official Selection

2007

- The Lunch, Installation and Performance in collaboration with Nina Breeder at Art Space Blanque Monteaux, Paris
- "Wurlitzer Repetitions" Ignite Art Center (Lauren Bon), Los Angeles*
- Artist in residence at Cite' Culture at the Maison Internationalle de Paris, France
- "Naked", Triple Video Projection - Chelsea Museum
- "Untitledx" Life Size Installation - Saatchi Art London

2006

- Amigdalae - Art Basel, Miami
- Amigdalae - Hôpital de la Salpêtrière, Paris
- Boreas Gallery, Scott Laugenour, Brooklyn, New York

2005

- Video installation at Ex-Macelli Freeshout with Sislej Xhafa
