= Marco Pillini =

Late nineteenth century Italian painter

Marco Pillini was a late nineteenth century Italian painter, mainly of genre subjects.

== Biography ==
He studied at the Albertina Academy of Fine Arts of Turin, but for many years was a resident of Paris. He dedicated himself almost exclusively and was prolific in Genre painting, his canvas had a sharp simplicity. Among his works: Un tamburo intempestivo; Un precoce autoritario; Breton Youth: Poor Breton Family; Fratellanza. He exhibited in London, Paris, and Italy. His wife, Margherita Pillini, was also a painter.
