= Giola Gandini =

Italian painter (1906–1941)

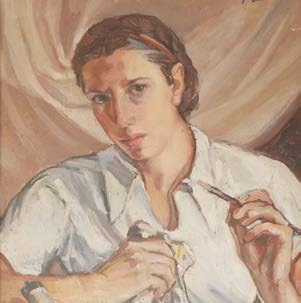
- Autoritratto by Giola Gandini, 1933.
- Born: May 19, 1906; Parma, Italy
- Died: September 1941 (aged 35); Venice, Italy
- Occupation: Painter

Giola Gandini (1906–1941) was an Italian painter.

== Biography ==
Gandini was born on May 19, 1906, in Parma to Ernesto Gandini and Diomira Di Centa of Venice. A childhood bout with polio limited her mobility and contributed to her reclusive lifestyle.

Gandini studied at the Accademia di Belle Arti di Venezia and at the atelier of the painter Vincenzo De Stefani. Her paintings feature intricate figure studies of women and intimate domestic scenes. Her painting career spanned twelve years from 1929 until her death in 1941. During this time, she participated in many exhibitions, including the Rome Quadriennale of 1935, and the Venice Biennale of 1940.

In October 2014, Gandini's work was featured posthumously in the exhibition Gabriella e le altre: quattro donne in Biennale at the Casa delle Muse in Mirano, Italy. The exhibition also featured work by Gabriella Oreffice, Maria Vinca, and Ernesta Oltremonti and was curated by Patrizia Castagnoli.

In addition to her work as a painter, Gandini was an accomplished pianist. She died September 1941, at the age of 35, in Venice.

== Gallery ==
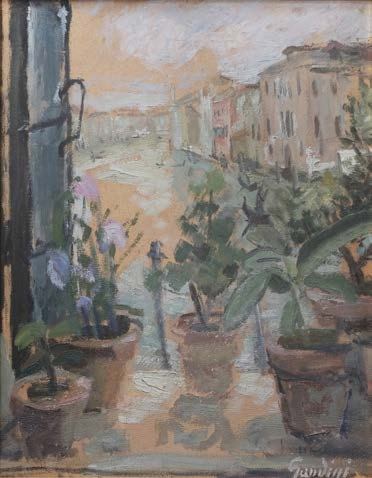
Veduta del Canal Grande (1932)

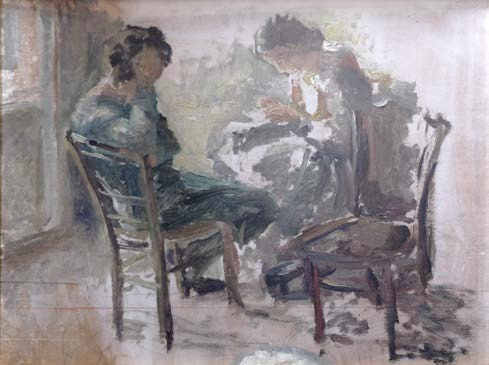
Sorelle che cuciono (1932)

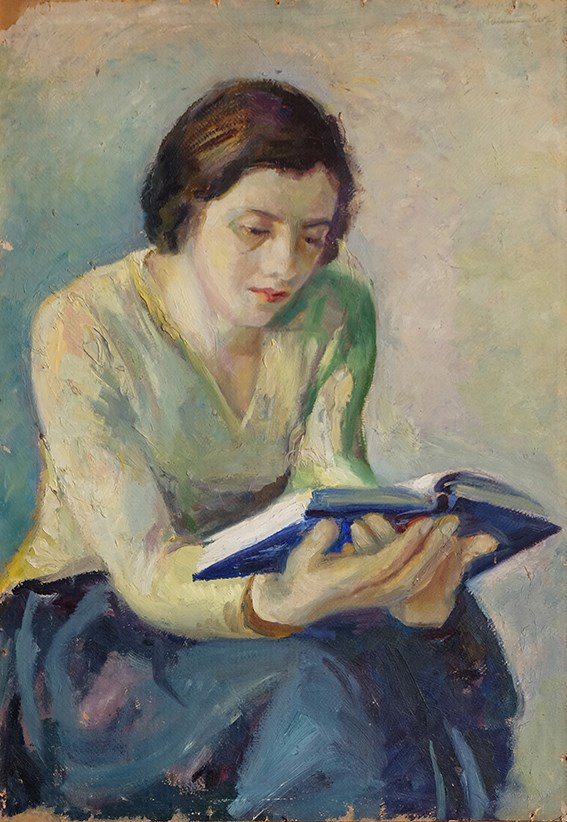
Donna che legge (1938)

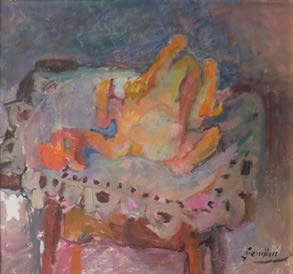
Natura morta (1940)

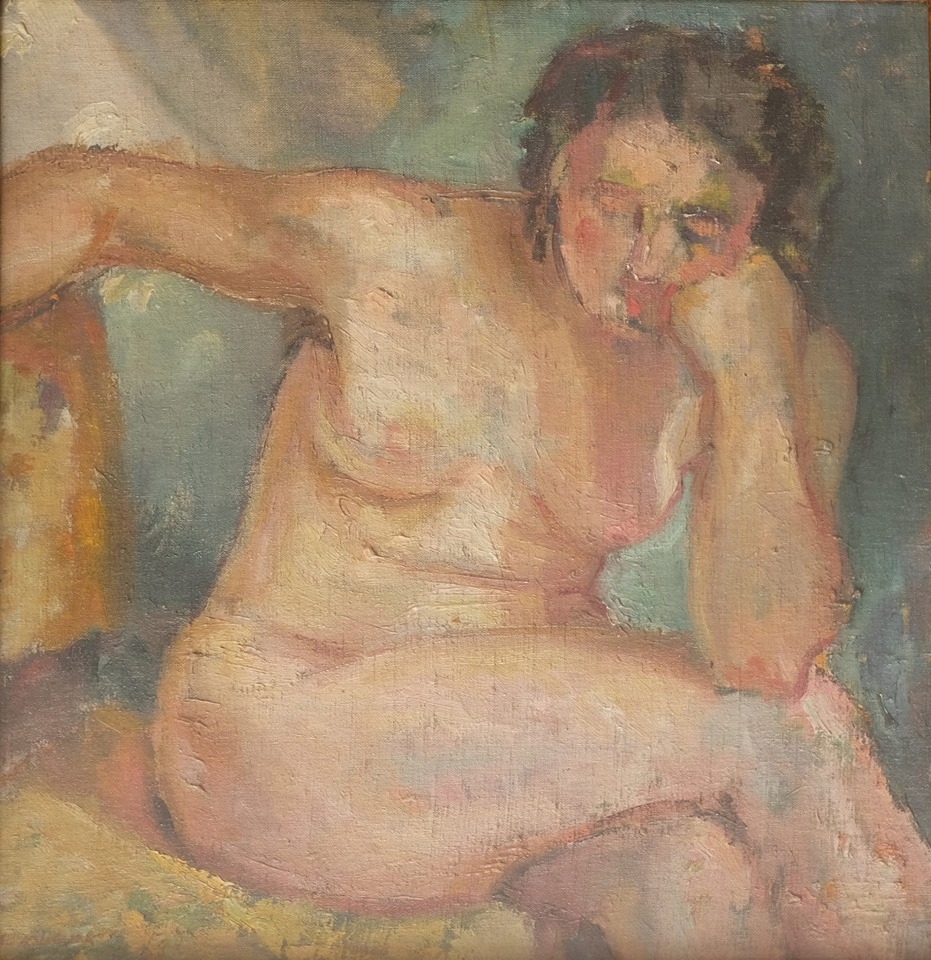
Nudo con gambe accavallate (1940)

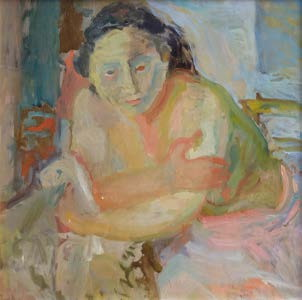
Donna appoggiata (1941)

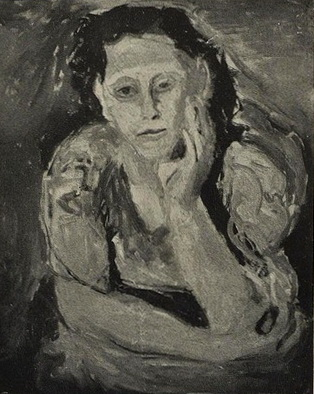
Studio di figura (1941)

== Bibliography ==
- Castagnoli, Patrizia (2014). Gabriella e le altre: quattro donne in Biennale: Gabriella Oreffice, Maria Vinca, Ernesta Oltremonti, Giola Gandini (in Italian). Mirano: Eidos. OCLC 941921894.
- Gandini, Alessandro, ed. (2013). Giola Gandini (in Italian). Roma: Cromografica Roma. BVE0632441.
- Giola Gandini, 1906-1941: Nettuno, Forte Sangallo 7-30 giugno 2002 (in Italian). Rome: Palladio Associazione culturale. 2002. BVE0290346.
- Comanducci, A. M. (1972). Dizionario illustrato dei pittori, disegnatori e incisori italiani moderni e contemporanei (in Italian). Vol. III. Milan: Ausgabe. OCLC 1573283.
- Vollmer, H. (1955). Allgemeines Lexikon der bildenden Künstler des XX. Jahrhunderts (in German). Vol. II. Leipzig: E.A. Seemann. OCLC 2452422.
