= Margherita Pillini =

Italian painter

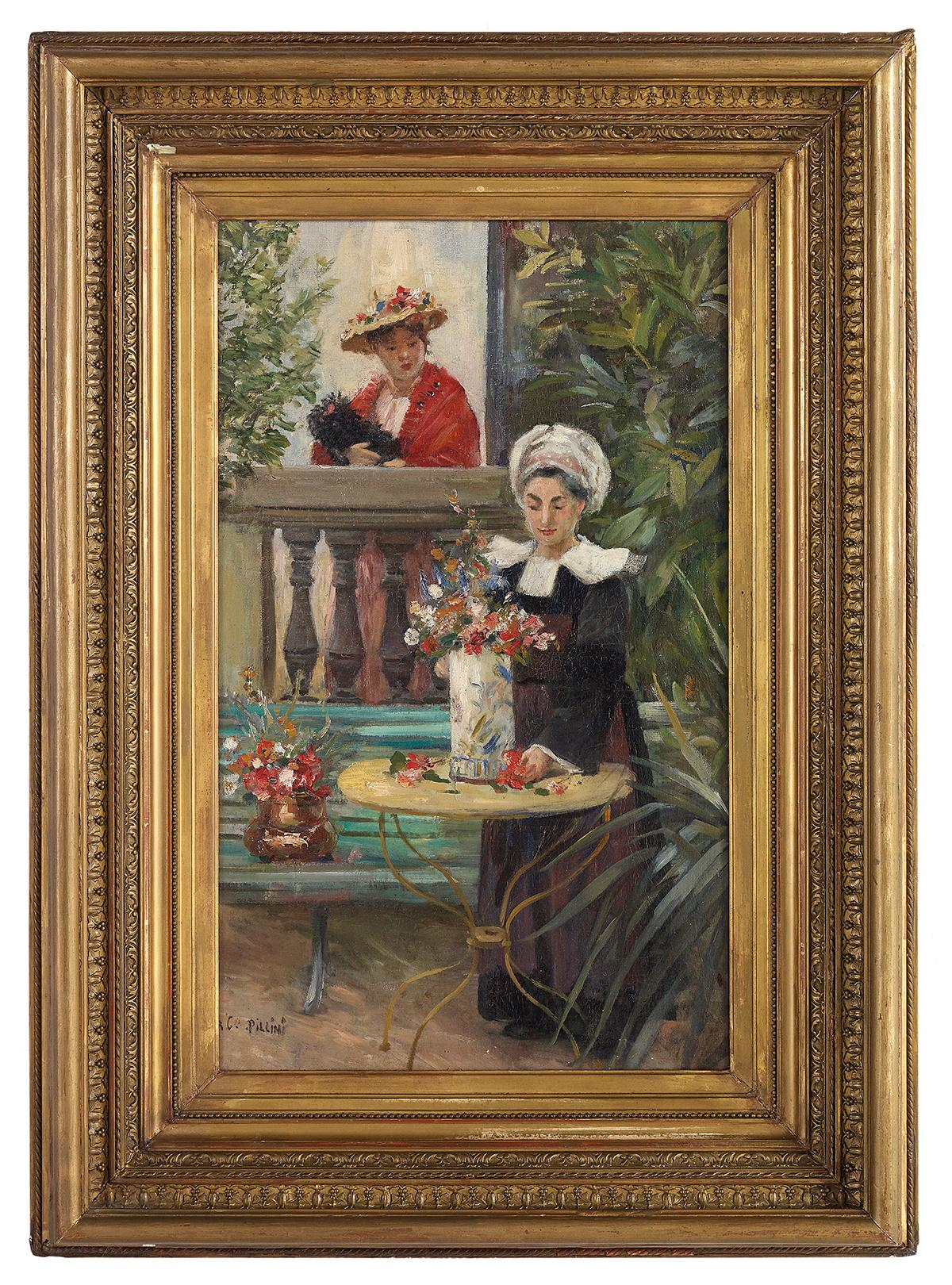
"On the Veranda", a painting by Pillini

Margherita Pillini was an Italian painter, active mainly in the late 19th century in Turin and Paris.

== Biography ==
Pillini was born in Lombardy and married painter Marco Pillini. For many years, she was a resident of Paris. She exhibited in 1883 at Rome: Stracciaiolo di Quimper or Stracciajuolo di Quinper ("Silk-cocoon Carder of Quimper") and Charity; in 1884 at Turin, in 1884: Three ages; Blind Poorman; Portrait del Prince of Naples; and another del vero genre painting.

De Rengis in his criticism of the "Silk-cocoon Carder of Quimper" said: "If I am not mistaken, Signora Margherita Pillini has also taken this road, full of modernity, but not free from great danger. Her ' Silk-cocoon Carder' is touched with great disdain for every suggestion of the old school. Rare worth—if worth it is—that a young woman should be carried by natural inclination into such care for detail. This method of painting, opposed to solid colors, desires to be seen from a distance, leaving the eye with an infinite wish for peace."

In 2019, her oil paintings were for sale on an auction site and sold between £400-1600GBP.
