= Clementina Marcovigi =

Italian painter

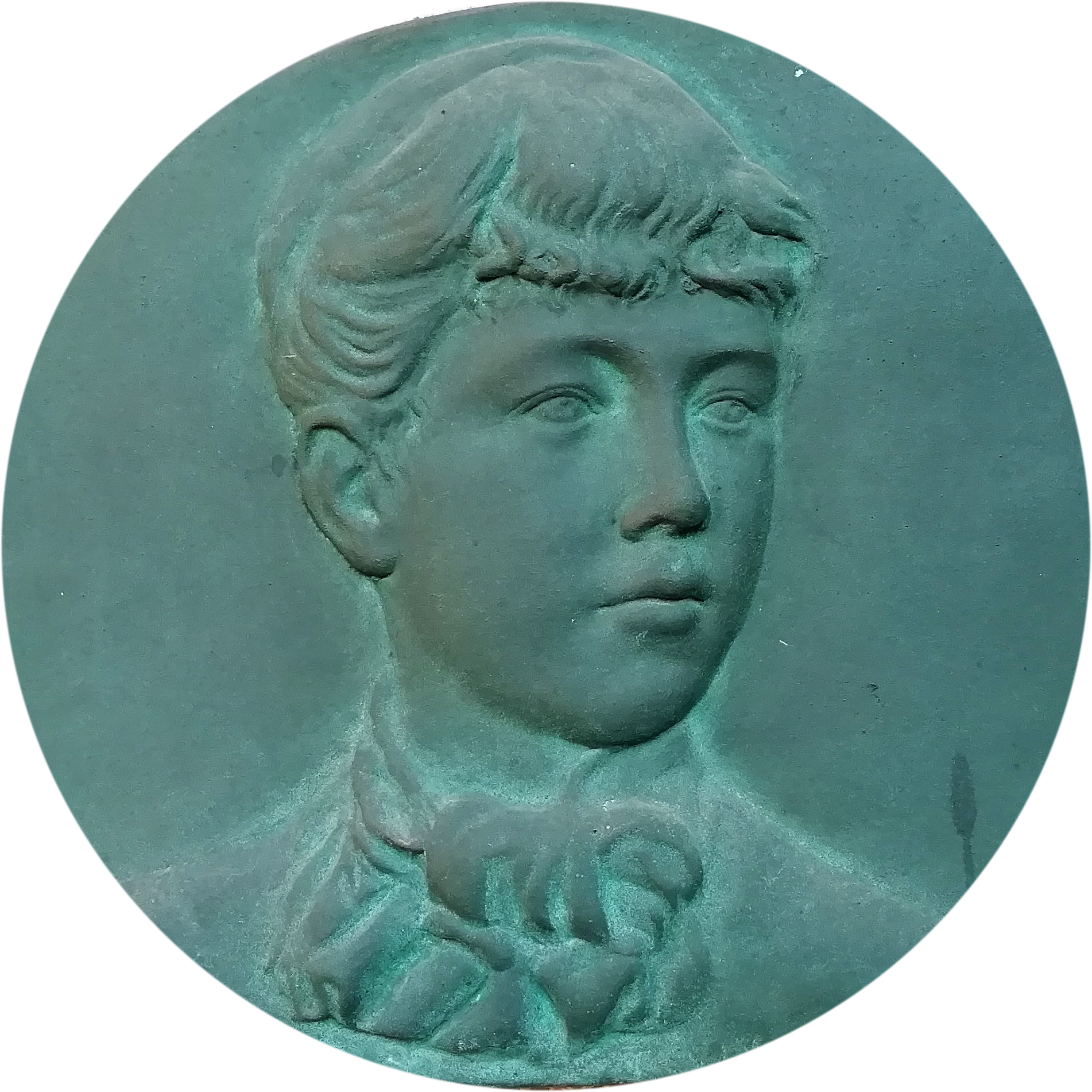
Portrait of Clementina Marcovigi by Cesarino Vincenzi

Clementina Marcovigi (1863–1887) was an Italian painter born in Rimini. She mainly painted still lives of flowers in watercolor. She was a resident of Bologna. In 1884 at Turin she exhibited a canvas with flowers; in 1887 at Venice, another canvas.
