= Isabella Maria dal Pozzo =

Italian painter

- Born: Turin, Duchy of Savoy, Holy Roman Empire
- Died: 1700; Munich, Holy Roman Empire
- Known for: Painting
- Elected: Princess Henriette Adelaide of Savoy

Isabella Maria dal Pozzo (died 1700) was an Italian painter.

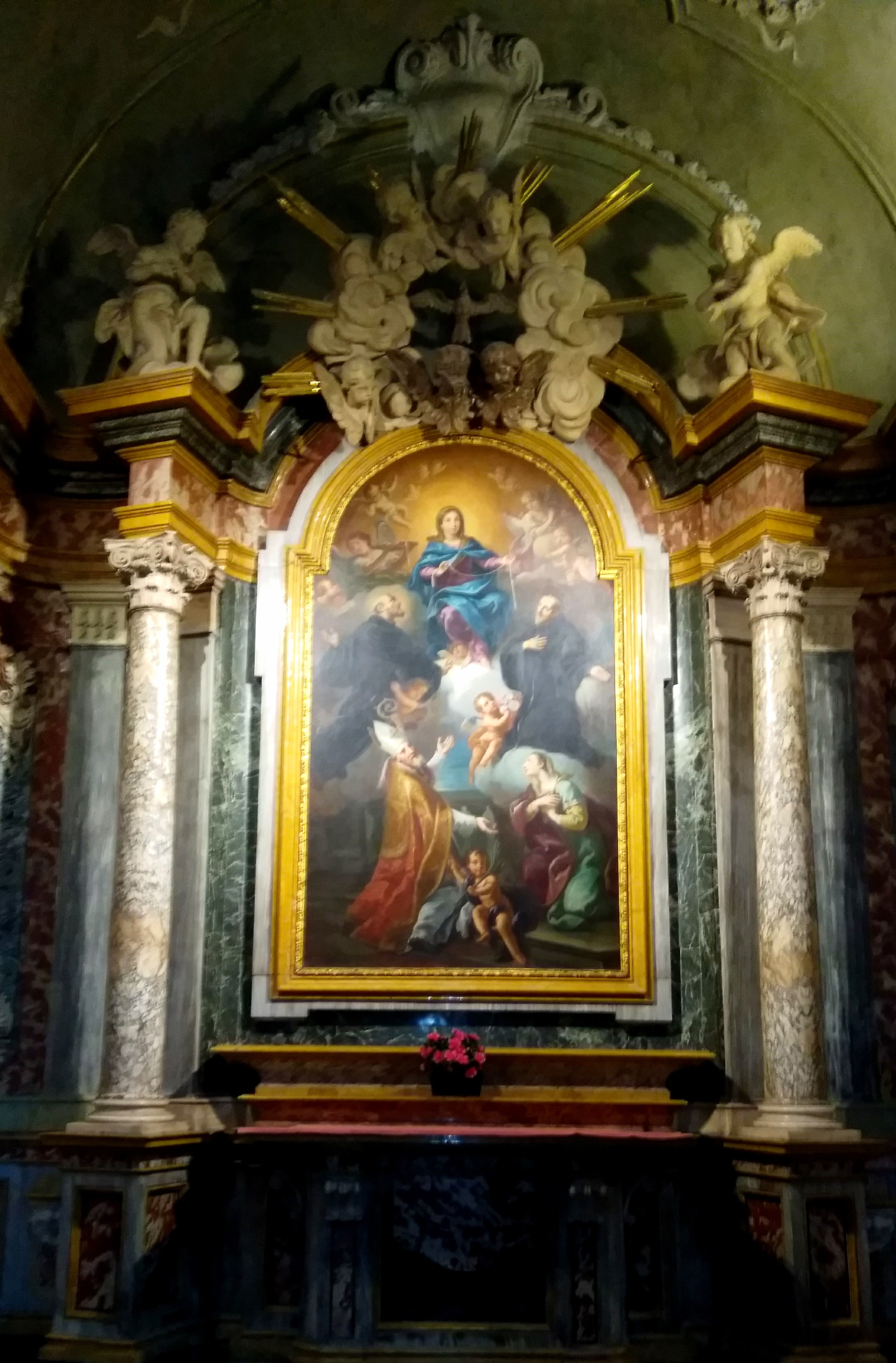
Altarpiece of Saints Biagio and Liduvina - Church of San Francesco Turin, by Isabella Maria dal Pozzo (1666)

== Life and work ==
Isabella Maria dal Pozzo was born in Turin. She flourished as a painter starting in the 1660s. Starting in 1676, she began working in the court of Princess Henriette Adelaide of Savoy.

== Notable collections ==
- Roman Charity (after Guido Reni), 1660–1699, National Trust
