= Madonna Fitta de Milano =

Italian painter

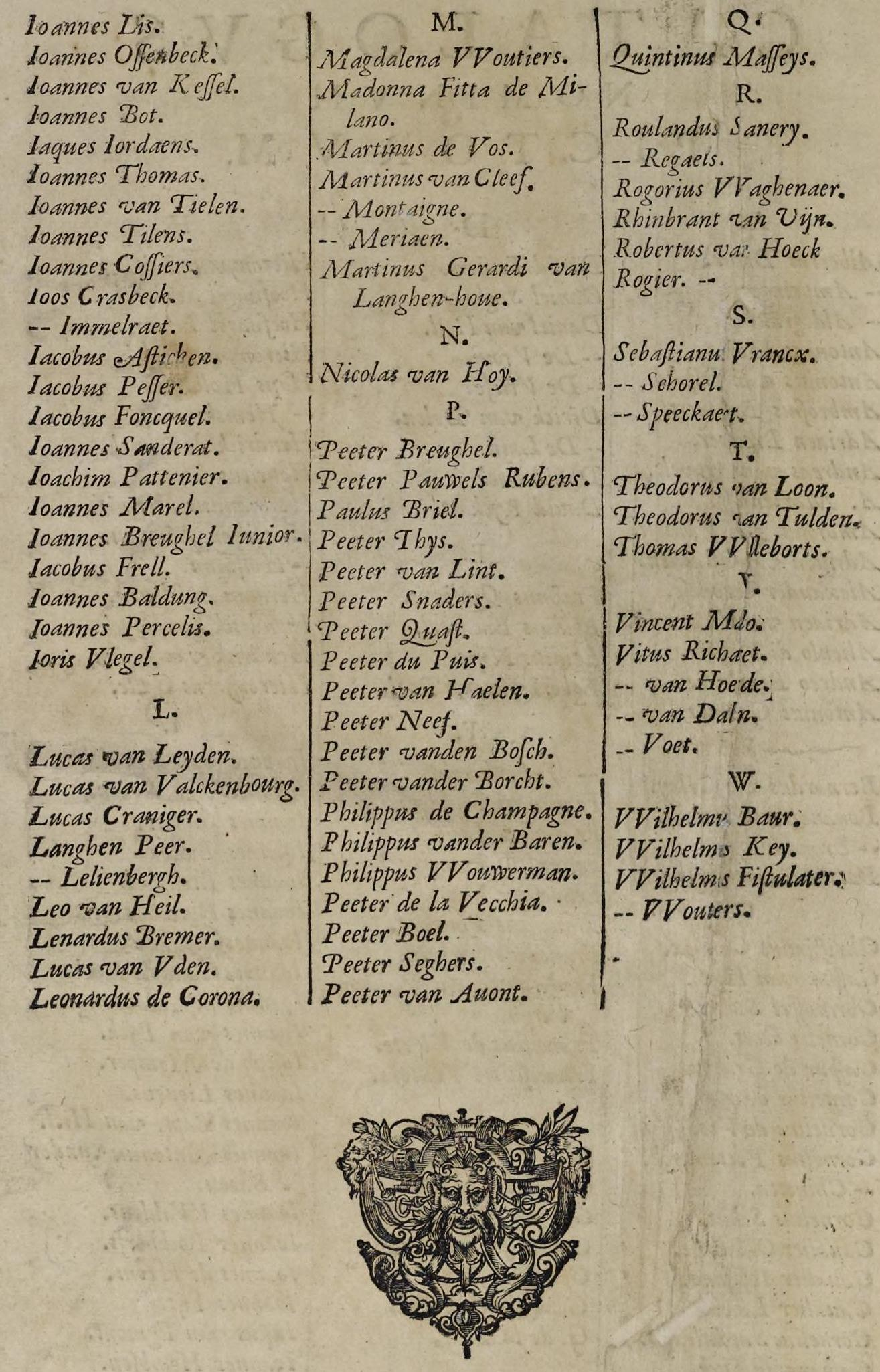
Page from the Theatrum Pictorium with her name

Madonna Fitta de Milano (born 17th-century) was an Italian painter whose works were in the collection of Archduke Leopold Wilhelm of Austria.

As her name implies, she was probably born in Milan or worked there at the time her works were purchased. All that is known of her is her name on a list of artists between Michaelina Wautier and Maerten de Vos.

It is possible that she is the same person as the Milanese painter Fede Galizia, considering the garbled spelling of some other artist names in the same catalog. No known works by Galizia are in the Kunsthistorisches Museum today, however there is a portrait by her hand in the Uffizi, where an exchange of paintings between the two collections occurred in 1792.
