= Nina Breeder =

Italian film director

- Born: November 13, 1979 (age 46); Genova, Italy
- Occupations: Artist, film producer

Nina Breeder (born in 1979 in Genova, Italy), is an Italian contemporary artist. She grew up in Northern Italy and lived there until the late 90'. After spending 15 years traveling through the States and working on shorts, full-length movies, photographs and sculptures, she moved back to Italy in 2015.

== Background ==
Back in 1999 N. Breeder began working on experimental films and performances in Florence. She later moved to Brooklyn, where she began collaborating on films and performance art, beginning the film production of Devil come to Hell and stay where You belong* and a series of land installations and performances. Her work is based on the confrontation with lost traditions and pagan rituals, often involving the use of hair, wool, fabric and organic materials.*

== Selected exhibitions ==
2013

"Relaxation Tapes" – Sound Works Series Vol.1

"Reconstruction of a Body" – Sound Works Series Vol.1

"20 Minutes MRI" – Sound Installation

"Analog Winds" – Winds Sound Design for the film Reservoir by Massimilian Breeder

'2012

"La Cagna" – Film – Currently in Production

"I am Indigenous to this Place" – Photo Series, Public Installation NYC

2011

"Selected Sound Works" – Tokyo, JP

"Working Bodies" – Photographs

"Human Frames"- Kunst im Tunnel, KIT

2010

"Winter Films" – ongoing film project shot in the Northern Hemisphere.

"Identity" – photographic book

"Happy End" – Ausstellung Exhibition, Kunsthalle Göppingen

2009

Devil come to Hell and stay where You Belong: Pera Museum, Istanbul, Turkey

Devil come to Hell and stay where you belong: Centre Georges Pompidou in Paris and Metz, France*

Freeshout and Pecci Museum, Prato, Italy*

Anthology Film Archives, New York City*

"Horse Pistes" – Centre Georges Pompidou, Paris, France

2008

Love is a Burning thing: Darom Art Center, Tel Aviv

Artoteca, Milan, Italy

Copenhagen International Film Festival, Official Selection

Goteburg International Film Festival, Official Selection

2007

The Lunch, Installation and Performance in collaboration with Nina Breeder at Art Space Blanque Monteaux, Paris

Unnatural Selections at Pierogi Gallery, Brooklyn

"Nuit Blanche" – Théâtre des Blancs-Manteaux, Paris, France

2006

Pierogi Gallery at ArtBasel, Miami

2005

Ex-Macelli Freeshout, Prato Italy

"PAM", Chelsea Art Museum, New York City
