= Elisa Rigutini Bulle =

Italian painter

Elisa Rigutini or Elisa Rigutini Bulle (1859 in Pistoia – ?) was an Italian painter. She was a resident of Florence.

Her painting are said to imitate antique tapestries, and she mainly exhibited in Florence during the late 1880s. Among her works are a canvas painted in gouache, depicting: i bambini giardinieri; and a study dal vero (from reality): Frutte; Oleandri, and L'incoronazione d'Ester. At the 1890 Exposition Beatrice, she was awarded a bronze and gold medal.

She translated some of Nietzsche's work titled Nietzsche giovane, to Italian; her work was approved by the philosopher's sister, Elisabeth Förster-Nietzsche. Elisa's husband Oskar Bulle (born 1857) was a German professor and philosopher, who wrote an Italian-German dictionary in collaboration with Elisa's father, Giuseppe Rigutini, a philologist (1829–1903).
