= Rosalba Pedrina =

Italian artist and art teacher

Rosalba Pedrina is an Italian artist and art teacher living in Vicenza, Italy.

== Biography ==
Rosalba Pedrina was born in Clusone, Italy on 14 August 1944, during the Second World War. She was raised in Povolaro, a small town outside Vicenza in the northeast of Italy, not far from Venice. Her father was Francesco Pedrina, a professor and literary critic.

After studying painting in Honolulu, Hawaii, she returned to Italy where she showed her first work in a collective exhibition in 1971. She continued painting and in 1981 opened a gallery called "Atelier d'Arte Studio R" in Vicenza, Italy. In 1987, she started an art school for children. The studio and art school were operated in Vicenza in the Palazzo da Schio on Corso Palladio, where she taught classes for children and adults. She celebrated the 25th anniversary of her art school in 2012. Her school is now located in Creazzo, Italy, just outside Vicenza.

Her artwork includes paintings, drawings, engravings, and ceramics. Most of her work has found its way into private collections in the United States, Italy, and other countries in Europe. Her work includes paintings of Venice, landscapes, flowers, and paintings relating to the sea. One of her most famous pieces (now in Italy) is the "Stations of the Cross (Via Crucis) for Persons Living with HIV/AIDS," a collection of twelve pieces originally created in 1992 to commemorate World AIDS Day. The "Via Crucis" work was last shown in 2008 in Vicenza at the Church of St. Mary of the Servants. She has also done extensive work in ceramics.

A book of her artwork, Rosalba Pedrina: Armonie di un Canto—Dipinti, Desegni, Incisioni, Ceramiche, was published (in Italian and English) in 1995.

== Major exhibitions ==
- Il mio mondo di sogno, Galleria Bramante, Vicenza, Italy (1979).
- Galleria d'Arte Moderna, Thiene, Vicenza, Italy (Dec. 1980).
- I Fiori di Rosalba, Studio R, Vicenza, Italy (Apr. 1982).
- Rosalba e i suoi fiori, Galleria 14, Florence, Italy (Nov. 1982).
- Venice and Music, Studio R, Vicenza, Italy (Sept. 1985).
- Venice in Mind, Studio R, Vicenza, Italy (Dec. 1987).
- Venezia Trasale . . . Emozioni . . ., Studio R, Vicenza, Italy (Sept. 1988).
- AIDS: The Stations of the Cross, Palazzo della Gran Guardia, Verona, Italy (Dec. 1992).
- Rosalba e i suoi fiori (1982–1992), Studio R, Vicenza, Italy (Dec. 1992).
- Le ceramiche – e incisioni di Rosalba (1986–1993), Studio R, Vicenza, Italy (Apr. 1993).
- AIDS: The Stations of the Cross, Chiesa di Santa Maria di Servi, Vicenza, Italy (Nov.-Dec. 2008).
- 25th Anniversary Show, Palazzo da Schio, Vicenza, Italy (May 2012)
