= Valentina Murabito =

Italian photographer and visual artist

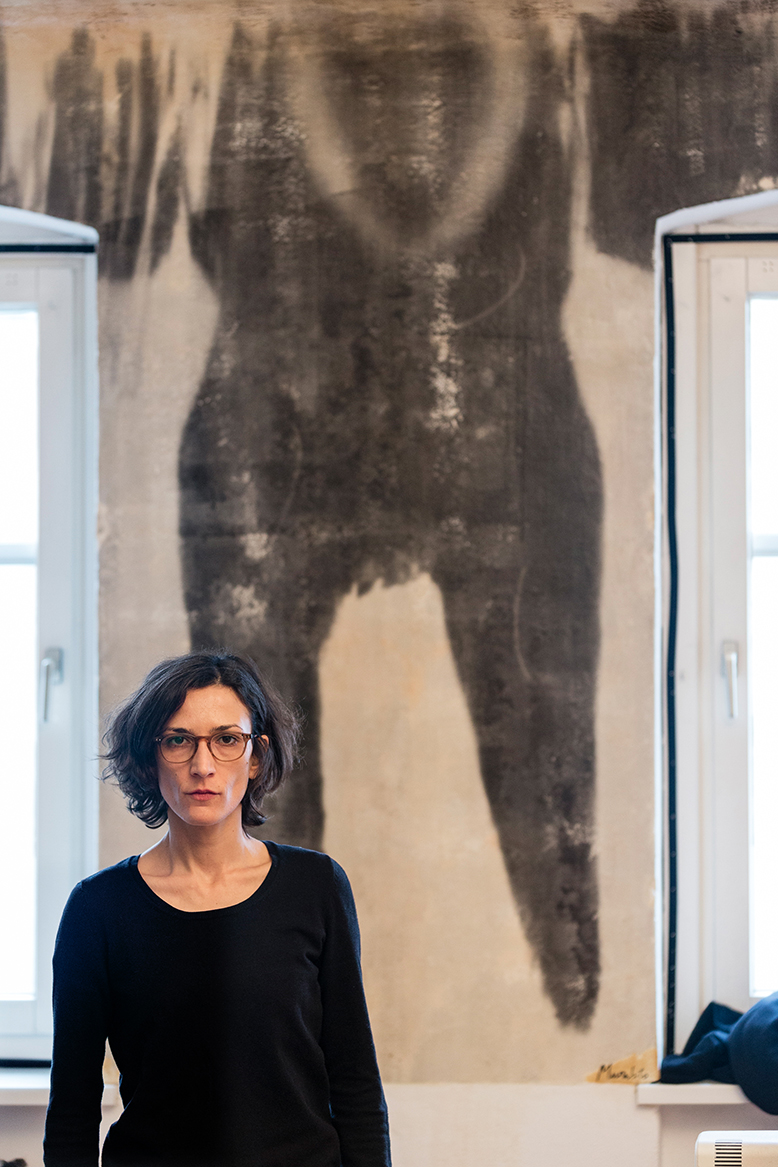
Murabito in 2016.

Valentina Murabito (born 28 September 1981 in Giarre, Italy) is an Italian photographer and visual artist. Her photographic works are a hybrid between different art forms merging in experimental analog photography.

== Early life and education ==
Valentina Murabito was born in Sicily. From 2004 to 2009, she studied graphic arts at the Accademia di Belle Arti di Catania where she studied graphics software, as well as xylography, lithography and photography. In 2008, she won two scholarships to study photography at the Moholy-Nagy University of Art and Design in Budapest. During this time, she created her series "Melankólikus", which unites video art, photography and video documentary. She graduated with honors. In 2009, Murabito moved to Germany and currently lives in Berlin.

== Artistry ==
In her pictures, Murabito creates "in-between-creatures" that do not fit into any determined category, hybrids between man and woman, human and animal. She plays with gender roles and questions the term of identity.

She experiments with analog photography, for instance, by dissolving the photographic surface in order to mold it like a skin or break it like dry earth. The artist develops her photographic work manually on baryte paper, watercolor paper, wood, steel, concrete and walls. Her works open up a dialogue with painting and sculpture.

Murabito’s aesthetic references the research of photography pioneers like Eadweard Muybridge. Her works try to surpass the boundaries of photography by questioning their relationship to reality. Like R. Hanselle wrote in fotoMagazin, they are “enchantment and transcendence.”

== Exhibitions and collections ==
Murabito’s works are displayed at the SpallArt collection in Salzburg, Austria and other international private collections. Her works were exhibited throughout Europe by the Klosterneuburg Monastery, Delizia Estense del Verginese, the Hungarian Academy Rome and the Municipal Museum Rosenheim.

== Publications ==
- Giorgio Bonomi (Ed.): Il corpo solitario. L’autoscatto nella fotografia – vol. III, book, Rubbettino Editore, Italy 2022
- Johanna Breede. Photokunst (Ed.): Magie der Stille, P.32, Berlin, Germany 2018 (Catalogue limited edition)
- Stadt Rosenheim (Ed.): Menschenskinder, P.160, Rosenheim, Germany 2018 (Catalogue limited edition)
- Cesare Biasini Selvaggi | Exibart Editions (Ed.): 222 Emerging Artists worth investing in: Selected by the most prestigious curators, critics, journalists and art galleries, P.244, Rome, Italy 2017, ISBN 888555301X
- Galerie Artgeschoss (Ed.): Artgeschoss 2017, P.93, Berlin, Germany 2017 (Catalogue in limited edition)
- Suzan Kizilirmak (Ed.): Die Aura ist zurück, P.78, Berlin, Germany 2016 (Catalogue in limited edition, in Archive of Academy of Arts, Berlin)
- Who art you (Ed.): Who Art You?, P.150, Milano, Italy 2015 (Catalogue in limited edition)
- Premio Occhi per l'arte contemporanea (Ed.): III° National Prize for Painting and Photography Paola Occhi, P.130, Migliarino, Italy 2014 (Catalogue in limited edition)
- Premio Basilio Cascella (Ed.): LVIII° National Prize for Contemporary Art Basilio Cascella, P.88, Cascella, Italy 2014, ISBN 978-8822899125 (Catalogue)
- Colletivo TM15 (Ed.): Veramiglia Contest 2014, P.60, Veramiglia, Italy 2014 (Catalogue limited edition)
- Kunstverein Glinde e.V. (Ed.): FORM-A (R) T, P.59, Glinde, Germany 2014 (Catalogue limited edition)
- Monastero dei Benedettini (Ed.): Astrazioni dal quotidiano, P.25, Catania, Italy 2007 (Catalogue limited edition)
