= Anna Vittoria Dolara =

Italian painter (1754–1827)

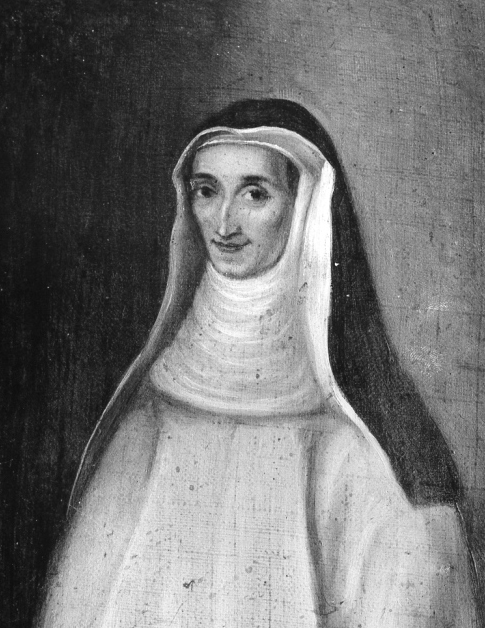
- Self-portrait
- Born: 1754; Rome, Italy
- Died: 1827 (aged 72–73); Rome, Italy
- Known for: Painting, Poetry

Suor or Sister Anna Vittoria Dolara (1754–1827) was an Italian Dominican nun in Rome; she is known for her piety, poetry, and painting.

== Biography ==
She was a nun in the monastery of Santa Maria Maddalena (later Santa Caterina a Magnanapoli in Quirinale during the Napoleonic occupation of Rome. When the French forces captured Pope Pius VI and closed the monasteries, Suor Anna continued her charity work, and wrote a poem in ottava rima, lamenting the situation in the city. The poem subsequently published in 1818 as Il Pianto delle Sacre Vergini Romane nella funesta Democrazia di Roma, composizione di Suor Anna Vittoria Domenicana in Santa Maria Maddalena, fra gli Arcadi Florinda Carisia. It included stanzas loosely translated as:

We are oppressed, and we leave nearby,/ Between starvation and sorrow, the afflicted discards;/ The holy edifice collapses, and the ruins/ Hold vigil with our dear grief;/ From whose penury we see no end,/Nor from our crying expect any fulfillment;/ Unless you, appeased at last, God of living,/ Sweet mercy, our pain can feel.

Passes the dove, and there is secure,/ Moaning softly within her nest;/ Back to their pens, the flock returns from pasture/ Without fear of treacherous betrayals./ We also entering these elected walls/ Believe we grasp firmly security;/ But instead face ambush, oh heaven! from the alliance/ Of the rapacious vulture and greedy wolf.

She was given the name Florinda Carisia among painters, and called later to paint the portrait of Popes Pius VII, and Leo XII, a copy of Guido Reni's the portrait of Beatrice Cenci, portraits of fellow Dominican nuns; and a portrait of the Queen of Etruria.
