= Itala Pellegrino =

Italian painter

Itala Pellegrino (born 1865) was an Italian painter; she mainly painted genre and seascapes.

== Biography ==
Born in Milan, she was a resident of Naples. She studied painting with professor Domenico Battaglia. At the 1881 Exposition of Turin, and at that of Milan, she sent seascapes. In 1888, at Naples, she exhibited Marina di Portici. At Rome in 1880, exhibited a genre painting titled: Frusta là!. Among her works are: Marina di Napoli: Nel golfo: Sera nel mare; and Tempo sereno.
