= Marina Sagona =

Italian-American artist

Marina Sagona (born 1967) is an Italian and American artist living in New York City. She works in a variety of visual media around the concepts of control and codependency, often collaborating with other artists. Sagona is the recipient of the 2017 Strategic 50 Award and of the 2019 Domus Artist Residency in Galatina, Italy.

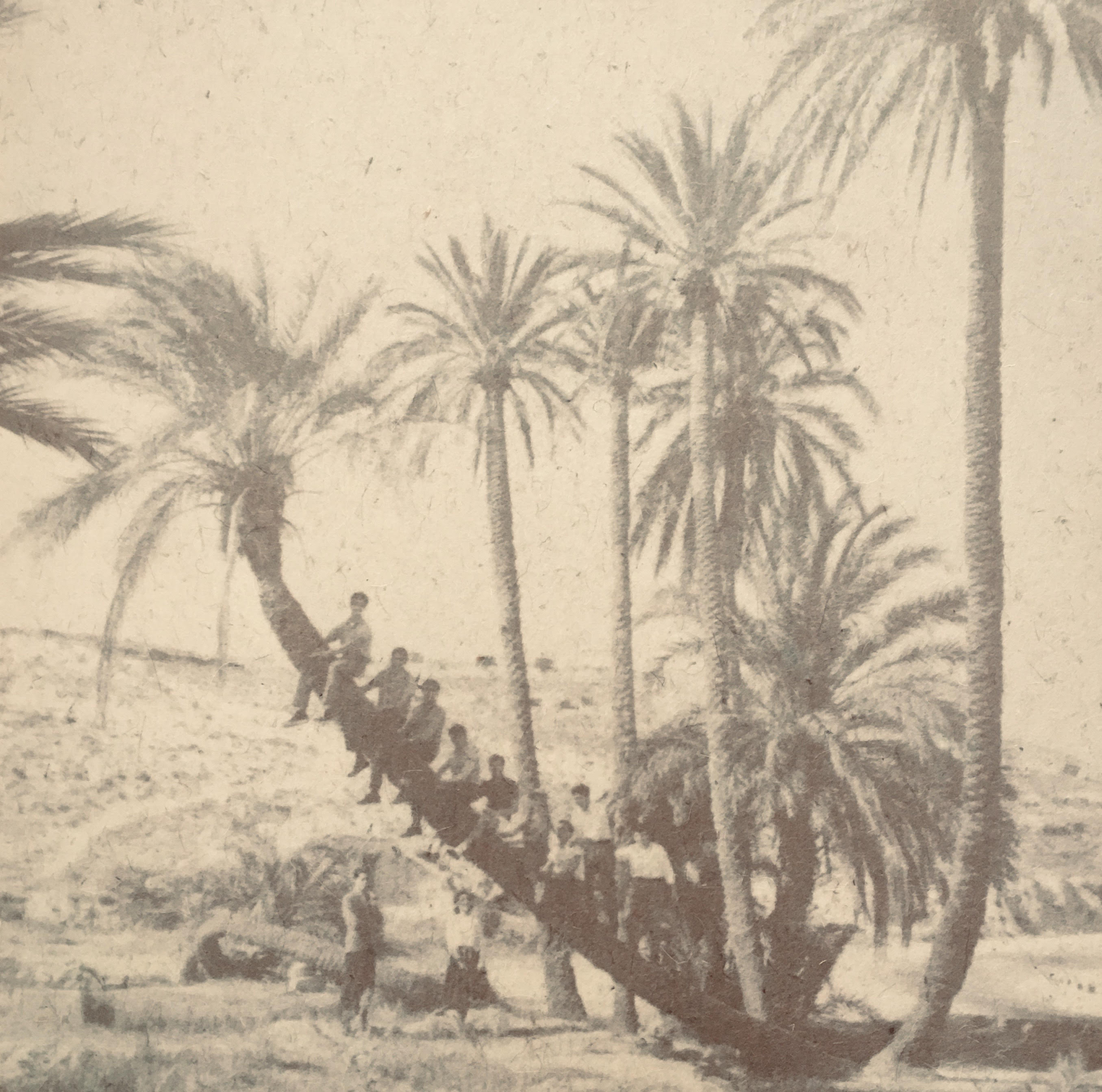
Couscous

== Life and education ==
Sagona was born in Rome and attended the Liceo Ginnasio Statale Virgilio and the Sapienza University of Rome. She first started her artistic career as an illustrator working in the publishing world. In Rome, she worked as assistant to artist Mario Schifano, one of the most significant and pre-eminent artists of Italian post-modernism. In 1995, she moved to the United States and began to contribute regularly to The New Yorker and The New York Times. In 2006, Sagona wrote and illustrated the book No, Anna e il cibo, based on her experience after her daughter was diagnosed with a rare form of infantile anorexia. Afterwards, Sagona gradually abandoned illustration for visual art. In 2014, she co-curated the show Dante Ferretti: Design and Construction for the Cinema at MoMA.

== Works ==
=== Couscous, 2020 ===
Couscous is a project that includes an 8 mm film transferred into digital with a recording of a voiceover, and prints on wool felt. On the right side of a split screen appears an assembly of family footage shot in Tripoli in the early ‘60s, over which the artist's father's voice explains his couscous recipe in Italian. While he talks about the recipe, an English text appears on the left side of the screen. This text is not the translation into English of the father’s recipe, but rather a sort of emotional decoding of it. Using an imaginary dictionary, Sagona translates his culinary love into a different conversation. The Italian voice-over serves as a sort of musical score to convey passion.

“The film Couscous is structured through multiple oppositions—dual screens, contrasting colors, moving images and texts, Italian and English, past and present—that come together in the big opposition of reticence (of the artist's father) and confession (of the artist). And, of course, this big opposition resolves in turn into a unity: loss, and loss. I admire how Marina Sagona brings this off with such clarity and balance, and absence of ostentation while evoking an emotion that seems as tantalizingly present as the aroma of the food.” Stuart Klawans, film critic.

=== Ubi Consistam, 2019 ===
"Ubi Consistam" means stable point, and it is part of the phrase Archimedes allegedly uttered after discovering the law of the lever. It is used to express the idea of a stable location, a foundation, and has evolved to describe, in its psychological sense, an existential position and a search for self-identity. The work in this catalogue includes thirty small sculptures in plaster and enamel, divided into the series Organs and The Five Senses, and sixteen drawings on prints titled Passport.

=== Self-Portrait, 2019 ===
The video Self-Portrait (25:55 minutes) is a group of six interviews with six different women, including the artist, on six different topics. The first two interviews are colored in green, the third and fourth in white and the fifth and sixth in red. The six protagonists are: Judith Thurman (writer), Ingrid Rossellini (professor), Anna Siciliano (student), Marina Sagona (artist), Giovanna Calvino (author) and Anna Funder (writer). Judith Thurman talks about her parents and her childhood; Ingrid Rossellini talks about moving to New York City in the early eighties and political correctness; Anna Siciliano talks about the difference between American and Italian upbringing and also about anxiety; Marina Sagona talks about codependence and abandonment; Giovanna Calvino talks about depression and approval; Anna Funder talks about chemical identity. Through the words of these women, the self-portrait of the artist takes shape.

=== The Prisoner, 2018 ===
Sagona's The Prisoner is a cycle about co-dependence exhibited at the Fondaco Gallery, Rome, in connection with the 13th edition of the Rome Film Fest. As Claire Messud writes in the essay on this work, “Codependent love entails a passionate devotion to the unrequited, a desire for self-abnegation. Its ironies are rife: how readily we give of ourselves, believing that eventually our sacrifices will be recognized; how thoroughly we put the needs and desires of the troubled before our own; how proud we are of our ability to stand in the heart of the flames, and burn”.

=== Eden, 2017 ===
Eden is an installation based on the idea of the world's regression to a new State of Nature. Sagona used found objects, collected over the years, that she disassembled, recomposed, and then covered in golden paint, creating a Midas' garden of hybrids and modern relics.

=== The Comedy of Women, 2016 ===
The Comedy of Women is a series of imaginary portraits of the women Dante Alighieri encounters during his journey to the afterlife. The series of portraits was accompanied by an introduction by Colum McCann and narrative portraits written by authors Judith Thurman, Jhumpa Lahiri, Alice Sebold, Claire Messud and Anna Funder.

=== Other work ===
Other work includes Amour Fou, a catalogue of carnal love, At Home, a work on "Intimacy and claustrophobia of domestic life, using the physical space of my home" and Punti Fermi, an investigation into female role models.
