= Patrizia Taddei =

Artist

Patrizia Taddei (born 1948) is an Italian-born artist in San Marino. After drawing attention in the early 1970s for her conceptual work, Taddei became known for her painting and sculpture. She has repeatedly represented the microstate of San Marino at the Venice Biennale.

== Biography ==
Patrizia Taddei was born in 1948 in Montescudo, a commune in the Italian province of Rimini. As a teenager, she attended an arts high school in Ancona. Then, beginning in 1969, she studied at the Accademia di Belle Arti di Urbino. She eventually settled in the microstate of San Marino, where she lives and works in Faetano.

During her time at the Accademia di Belle Arti she became interested in the conceptual art movement, as well as Arte Povera. Between 1973 and 1974 (she produced a series of conceptual works, some of which were recorded through photographs, while others are only recorded in the memories of the artist and attendees. Subjects explored in this series included San Marino's unique experience as a microstate.

In addition to these conceptual works, Taddei has primarily produced works of painting and sculpture. In the 1980s, she shifted to work that explores alchemy and astrology. Her work has also drawn on imagery from religion, mythology, and fairy tale.

Alongside Marina Busignani Reffi, Walter Gasperoni, and Gilberto Giovagnoli, she is one of the San Marino artists whose work is represented in the San Marino National Gallery. The museum's permanent collection prominently features her 1973 conceptual work Andare via. Her work has also represented San Marino at the Venice Biennale on multiple occasions, most recently in 2017.
