= Luigia Massari =

Italian painter

- Born: 1810; Piacenza, Italy
- Died: 1898 (aged 87–88)
- Known for: Painting, Embroidery

Luigia Massari (Piacenza, 1810 – 1898) was an Italian painter and embroiderer.

== Biography ==
She was a pupil of Antonio Gemmi. Among her works: San Martino, main altarpiece of the church of Altoè, Santa Filomena for the church of Busseto, a Madonna del Carmine and St Anne for the church of Monticelli d'Ongina. She also was an embroiderer of cloth for altarpieces. She won many awards including at Piacenza in 1869. She painted an altarpiece for the small church of Guastafredda in Piacenza.
