= Vincenzo Rocchi =

Italian painter

Vincenzo Rocchi (active in late 19th century) was an Italian painter.

He was born and a resident of Prato, and respected for both painting figures, but mostly for landscape. He worked from reality, adventuring outdoors to paint his landscapes.. Among his works are Parterre fuori la Porta San Gallo in Florence: displayed along with Una Pioggia and Gruppo di Contadini in the 1883 Florentine Exposition. In 1884 at the Exposition of Fine Arts a Florence and at Turin, he displayed View of Porta San Giorgio and Sulla stazione. At the 1885 Exhibition of Florence, he displayed : l' Autunno; il Montepiano e l'Imbrunire di un giorno. To the 1887 Exposition of Florence, he sent two landscapes: il Novembre, il Dicembre, and a painting titled Idillio. At the 1886 Esposition of Fine Arts in Florence, he sent one of his masterworks: Passa il treno; in addition, he sent Villa degli Ori presso Prato and a Veduta Lungo la via ferrata.

He also published a monograph about fellow alpine landscape artist Emilio Bertini
