= Margherita Pavesi Mazzoni =

Italian painter, sculptor and poet (1930–2010)

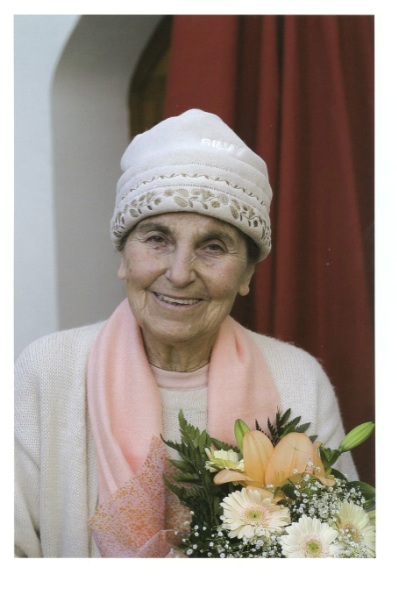
Margherita Pavesi Mazzoni

Margherita Pavesi Mazzoni (Milan, 4 September 1930 – Montepulciano, 25 November 2010) was an Italian painter, sculptor and poet.

== Early life and education ==
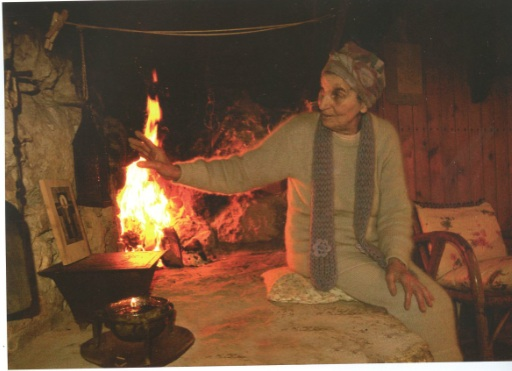

Born in Milan, Margherita Pavesi Mazzoni was attracted to music and figurative painting from an early age. In 1961 she met Aldo Carpi, who was at the time director of the Academy of Fine Arts of Brera, and became his student; during these years she dedicated her artistic research to figurative and expressionist art. Given her promise, she was selected to attend the school of Aldo Salvadori in both Milan and Bergamo.

In the 1950s she participated in many collective exhibitions in Italy and, in the following decade, she presented her works in solo exhibitions in Italy and abroad. In the first years of the 1970s she moved to Florence where she trained in xylographic (woodcut) technique at the studio of Pietro Parigi. During her travels to Germany, Belgium and Holland she deepened her knowledge of the Expressionists. Settling in Tuscany, she became fascinated with the painters of the Scuola Senese and with the Romanesque art present in the medieval churches and abbeys scattered throughout the Tuscan countryside.

Influenced by the powerful visual art of the Expressionists, in addition to her interest for pre-historic and African art, she began to explore the condensation of the meaning in symbolic images. Her artistic experimentation combined, in the following years, with a more spiritual approach. She met padre Giovanni Vannucci, who became for her a guide in her development towards a religious and ecumenical point of view.

In 1973 she established her residence in Montepulciano, where she lived for the rest of her life surrounded by the Tuscan hills. She dedicated one of her last exhibitions to the memory of her late husband, her children and grandchildren, her friends and all the people who had accompanied her in the long path of life.

== Works ==
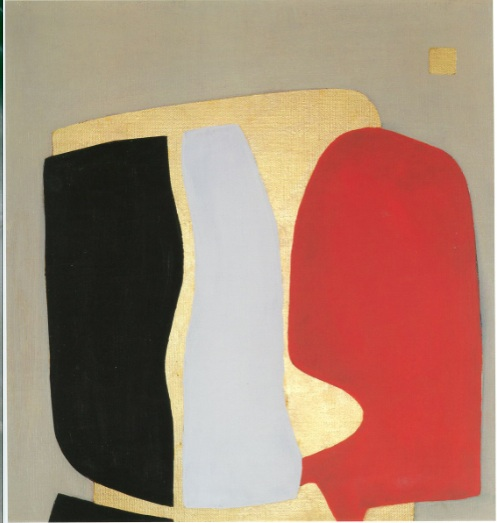
Nigredo, Albedo, Rubedo: il pellegrinaggio dell’anima attraverso la metamorfosi (Nigredo, Albedo, Rubedo: the pilgrimage of the soul through the metamorphosis)

Non tra fiamme e scintille ho vissuto il mio sogno
Ma in perenne incendio d’amore

Translation:

Not among flames and sparks have I lived my dream,
But in the perennial fire of love.

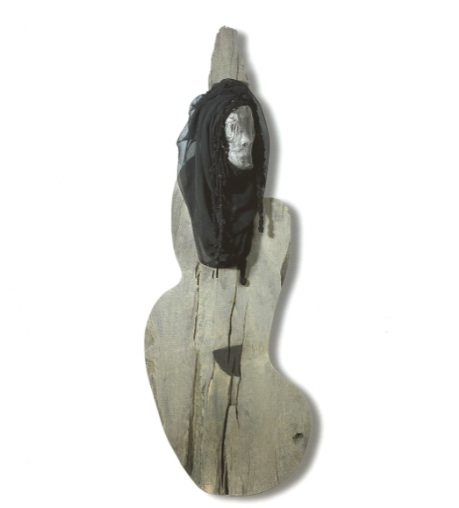
Archetipo femminile: non io grido di dolore ma il dolore grida in me (The female archetype: it is not me that is screaming in sorrow but sorrow that is screaming in me), oil on canvas

Fascinated by a primordial, simple and concise artistic medium, she often privileged earth tones, dense colours, materic painting and wooden supports. The use of terra tonalities and "mystical" colours such as gold reveals a deep connection with the historic tradition of religious icons and with Biblical topics. In an interview she affirmed: "my sculptures are a mix of dreams and utopias, they are the ultimate conclusion of my search for a sense in life".

In her Autobiografia cromatica (2010), written shortly before her death, she described her artistic palette as being based on three primary colours: Black, White and Gold. These colours correspond to the three different periods of the artist's life: Black for the ardent enthusiasm of youth and its natural disappointments, White for personal and artistic maturity, and Gold when the artists has reached the apex of a cosmic spirituality.

She worked throughout her life with different techniques: fresco, mixed media, painting on wood, sculpture, charcoal drawing, sacred icons, xylography (woodcut), oil on canvas and on cardboard, tempera, and golds.

The image of the woman has always been central to her art. The transformation of a woman's pain, humiliation and exclusion into hope and light is a theme in some of her works, drawing from the experiences of her own troubled life.

== Artistic achievements ==
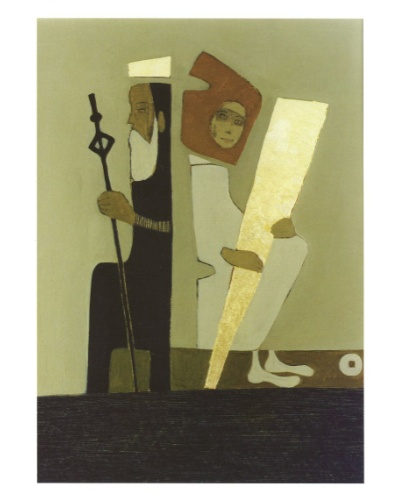
Giustizia e misericordia (Justice and Mercy), oil on canvas

Among her most important exhibitions (more than 80 in total) were those held in Lucerne and Ottoberg in Switzerland, in Salbach in Austria in 2001, at the United Nations Office in Geneva in 2003, near Busto Arsizio in 2006, in Montepulciano several times, in Rovereto and Trento in 2009 and 2010. Margherita Pavesi Mazzoni personally supervised the organization of the interior space of the church of S. Antonio a Reggiana (Prato) between 1994 and 1996.

The Museum of Modern Art (MoMa) of New York acquired her painting "Giustizia-misericordia" (Justice and Mercy). Margherita described the dichotomy between Justice and Mercy with the following words: The male figure is the symbol of the patriarchal power: he evaluates, assesses and condemns according to the law. The female figure goes beyond the legal categories, she carries a bundle of ears of grain, symbol of bread and nourishment, and she acts according to her merciful heart.

== Death ==
After a life dedicated to art as a way to get closer to God and humankind, she died in her home near the town of Montepulciano on 25 November 2010. She is buried in the cemetery of the Sanctuary of Montesenario, near Florence, near the tombs of the seven holy founders of the Order of the Servants of Mary.
