= Amalia de Angelis =

Italian painter

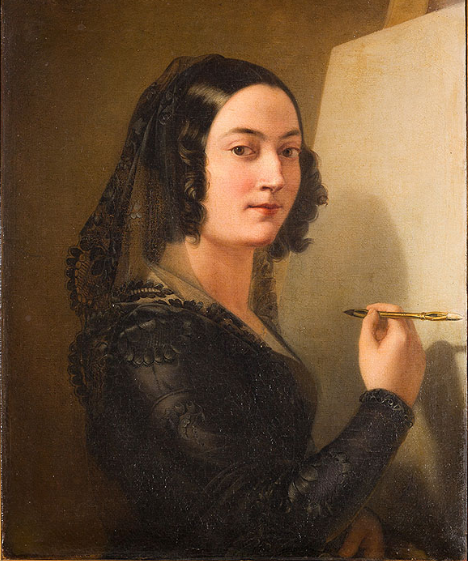
- Self-portrait, 1845
- Born: Rome

Amalia de Angelis or Deangelis (active 1851–1871) was an Italian painter, active in Rome. Her portrait of Monsignor Josip Juraj Strossmayer, bishop of Diakovar, was lauded by contemporaries. She was named an honorary member to the Ducal Academy of Fine Arts of Parma on 15 April 1846. Her painting depicting St Lawrence and the Crowning of Solomon were awarded prizes in exhibitions held at the Campidoglio by the Congregation of the Virtuosi of the Pantheon in March 1846. The latter had also awarded prizes in 1840 by the Academy of St Luke in Rome. She also painted a canvas depicting the Blessed Michele de'Santi, presumably for the member of the Ducal Court in Parma.
