= Francesco De Rocchi =

Italian painter (1902–1978)

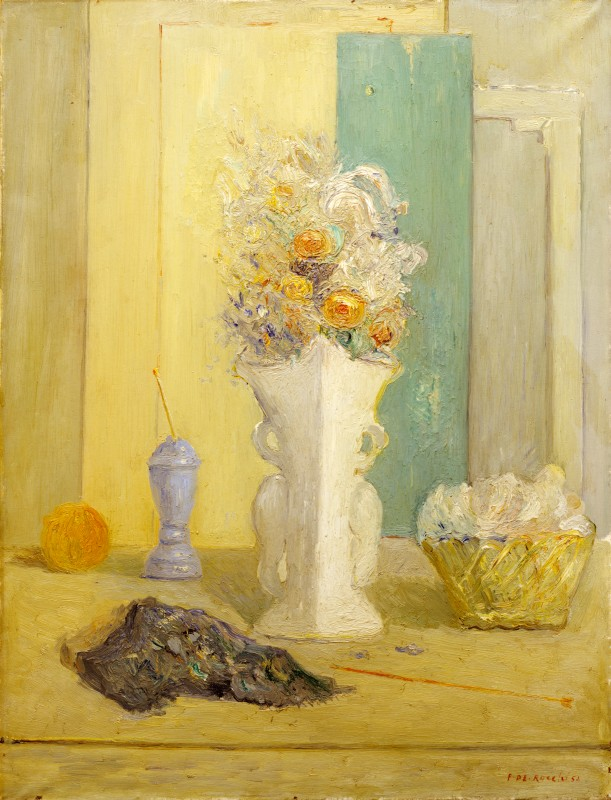
Composizione, 1952. Courtesy of Fondazione Cariplo, Milan

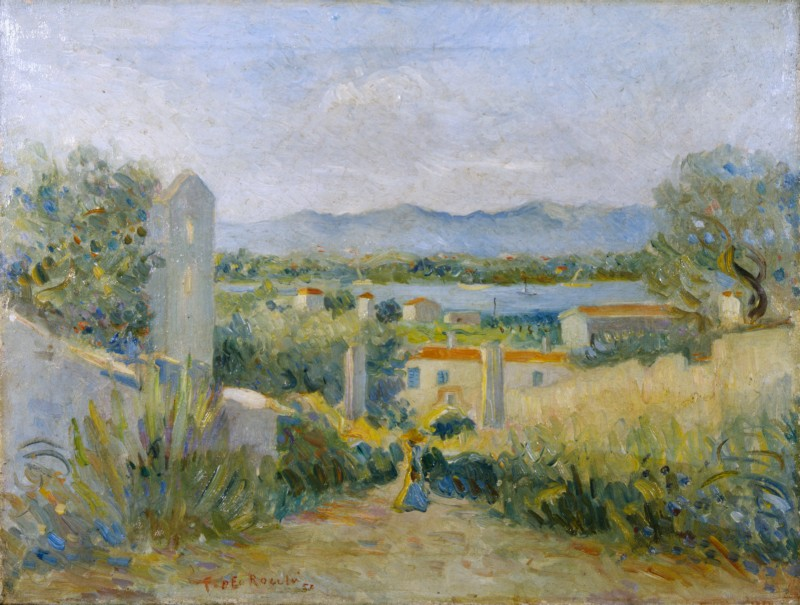
Boca di Marga, 1957

Francesco De Rocchi (1902–1978) was an Italian painter.

== Biography ==
De Rocchi was born in Saronno. He studied art at the Brera Academy in Milan from 1916 to 1926. He started an association with the Novecento Italiano movement in the second half of the 1920s. His maiden participation to the Venice Biennale was on the occasion of the 15th edition in 1926. In 1927 the Galleria d'Arte Moderna, Milan bought one of his works and in 1929 he took part in the Seconda Mostra del Novecento Italiano in Milan. De Rocchi's involvement with the Chiarismo movement in the 1930s was expressed by a lightening of colour and reduction of volume in his work. In 1937 he obtained a teaching post at the Brera Academy in 1937 and in 1939 he won the Bergamo Prize. Mostly based in Milan, he continued to paint and exhibit after World War II, with frequent stays in Venice and Versilia. He died in Milan.

== Other projects ==
Media related to Francesco De Rocchi at Wikimedia Commons
