= Maria Zacchè =

Italian artist

Maria Zacchè (born 25 February 1935 in Mantua) is an Italian artist. She is mostly specializes in pen and ink drawings representing historical buildings, although she is also known for her allegories and religious images.

Maria Zacchè: Porta Cerese, Mantua. Reconstruction of the portal in 1240. Pen and ink. 1980

== Biography ==
Maria Zacchè was born in Mantua, Italy, in 1935. She started drawing during her free time while working in a shop.

During a trip to Tuscany she discovered the crypt of San Miniato that had been closed for more than one hundred years. She drew pen and ink views of the interior, spending three months studying and drawing the crypt with her colleague and friend Anna Maria Rusconi.

In 1988 Zacchè published a book of drawings about the life of Saint Luigi Gonzaga. The book contains 90 pen and ink drawings that symbolically represent the main stages of his life, and his pilgrimage in Italy, France, and Spain. Rusconi wrote a biography of the saint to accompany the drawings.

In 1991 she held an exhibition of her work in the Cathedral of Mantua.

== Listing of selected works ==
- 1980- Porta Cerese, Mantua. Reconstruction of how the portal was in 1240. Pen and ink.
- 1987- Basilica of San'Andrea's Doors, Mantua. Pen and ink.
