= Fortunato Rocchi =

Italian painter (1822–1909)

Fortunato Rocchi (March 14, 1822 – April 9, 1909) was an Italian painter, mainly of landscapes, and also an architect involved in local restorations.

He was born and resided in Prato. In 1870, he contributed to the "Neo-Renaissance style" decoration of the Council hall of the Palazzo Pretorio in Prato. At an 1882 Prato exposition, and subsequently in Florence, he displayed Veduta della collina nella Valle del Bisenzio, Autunno and Paese presso Prato. Encouraged by the success of these paintings, the next year, he sent six paintings, three to the Exhibition of Turin and three to the Exposition in Florence. At Turin, he displayed Il Mulino delle Mogne (Castiglion de' Pepoli), Via Erbosa presso Filettole and Paesaggio; at Florence, Via erbosa presso Prato, Una bella giornata d'inverno and another painting. To the 1889 Exhibition of Fine Arts in Florence, he sent Veduta sull'argine del Bisenzio and a plate painted in oil depicting Veduta sul fiume Bisenzio.

He served as an architect in restorations and in reconstructing the exterior of one of the walls of the Basilica Santa Maria delle Carceri in Prato. He also taught Disegno (Drawing technique) at the local Cicognini College and the Magnolfi Orphanage.
