= Roberta Silva =

Italian artist

Roberta Silva (born 1971, in Trinidad and Tobago) is an artist based in Milan and Lake Garda.

== Education and career ==
Silva attended the Brera Academy of Fine Art where she graduated in 1995. She works mainly with sculpture, installation and site-specific interventions.
