= Francesca Pasquali =

Italian artist

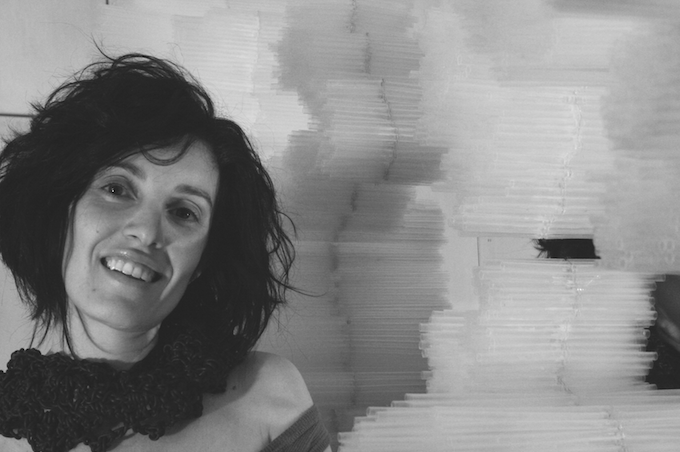
Francesca Pasquali

Francesca Pasquali (born 1980) is an Italian artist. She studied at the Academy of Fine Arts in her native Bologna. Pasquali‘s work can be divided into several cycles of work, recognisable by their titles that often refer to the materials used, as with the Straws series. Cut to different lengths, innumerable plastic straws are attached to wooden panels – or more recently to mirror-polished Plexiglas – to create a vibrating surface. In the Frappe series, Pasquali experiments with neoprene, assembling layers oyyf the material into spirals which are then mounted onto wooden panels or metal nets. Works from the Bristles series consist of plastic broom bristles assembled into wooden containers and arranged to form a soft, compact surface.

More recently, the artist has been experimenting with long, uncut, plastic bristles, in particular with the site-specific installation Francesca Pasquali for Salvatore Ferragamo travelling to Milan and London in 2016.

Pasquali’s work is also characterised by a sensitivity to materiality, experimenting with various materials including plastic, marble and bread and the artist often works to commissions, marrying the specificities of her practice with the particularities of the request.

In 2013, alongside several Italian artists and curator Ilaria Bignotti, Francesca Pasquali founded the artistic and cultural movement Resilienza italiana, which aims to further the international debate around sculpture among contemporary and emerging artists.

A finalist of the Cairo Prize in 2015 and the recipient of the second prize at the Henraux Foundation Prize in 2014, Francesca Pasquali has been invited to participate in several major international art fairs such as Art Basel in Miami and Hong Kong, FIAC in Paris, TEFAF in Maastricht, Art First in Bologna and MiArt in Milan. Her works are housed in important private collections and several public institutions throughout Italy and abroad.

In December 2015, the Francesca Pasquali Archive was founded with the help of Ilaria Bignotti, the scientific director, in order to archive, preserve and promote the artist’s works through different projects with public and private institutions, as well as to present her research through innovative systems of communication.

== Prizes and mentions ==
- 2015 Cairo Prize. Finalist
- 2014 Henraux Foundation Prize. Second Prize
