= Giovanni Francesco Guerrieri =

Italian painter

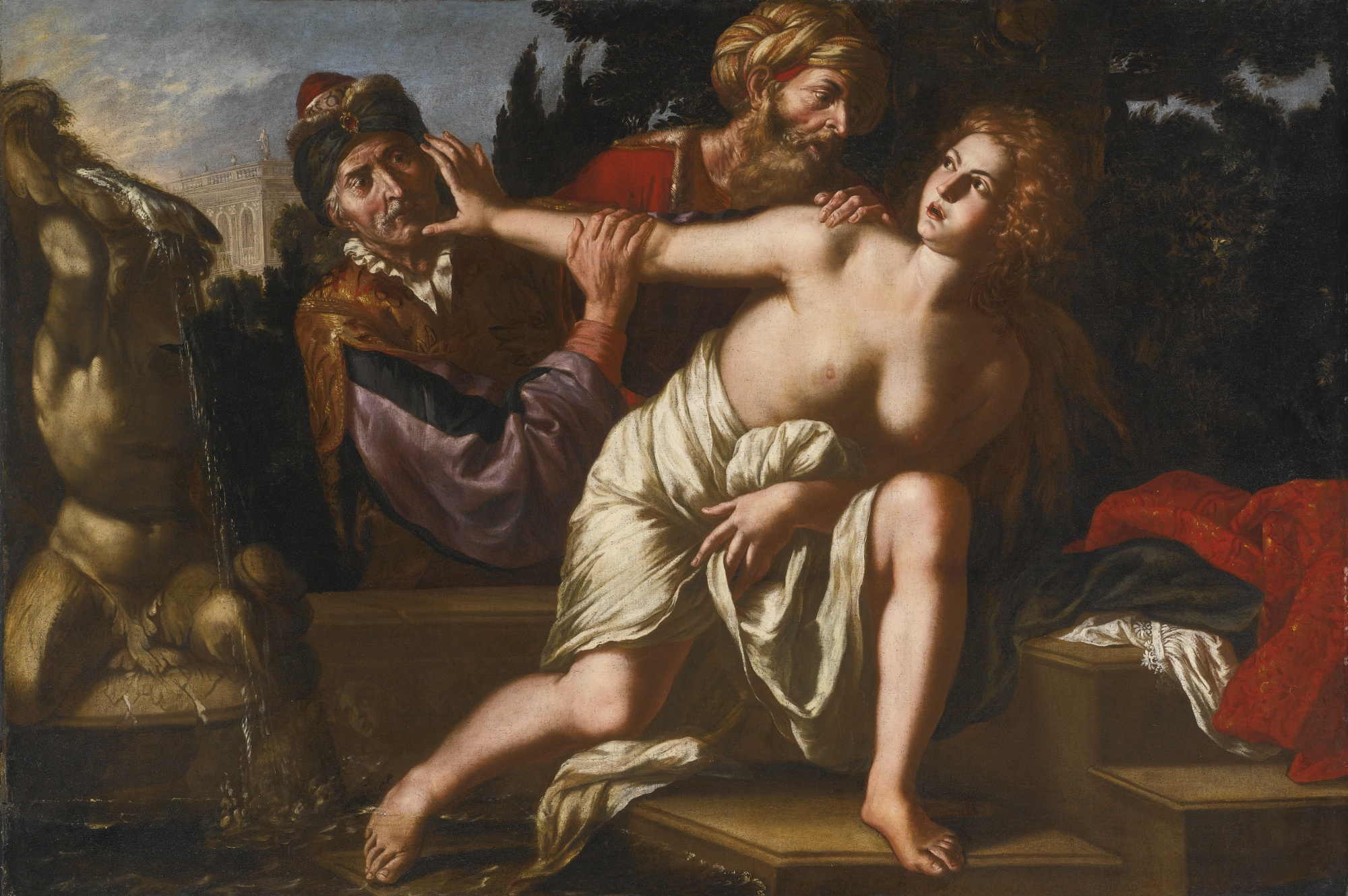
Susanna and the elders

Giovanni Francesco Guerrieri (1589–1655) was an Italian painter, and Caravaggisto.

Guerrieri was born in Fossombrone. In 1606 he travelled to Rome where he studied under some notable artists including Orazio Gentileschi. Returning home in 1614, he completed two versions of the work Miracles of St. Nicholas of Tolentino.

Guerrieri made a second visit to Rome and earned a commission from Marcantonio II to do some frescoes and paintings. Upon completion he returned home again, and continued painting until after an accident in which his wife and daughter were killed. Guerrieri moved to Pesaro to live with his other daughter Camilla Guerrieri, who was also a painter. He died in Pesaro in 1655.
