= Olga Napoli =

Italian painter

- Born: 2 July 1903; Salerno, Campania, Italy
- Died: 15 May 1955 (aged 51); Rome, Italy
- Known for: Painting, sculpture, drawing

Olga Napoli (Italian: [ˈnaːpoli]; Salerno, 2 July 1903 – 15 May 1955) was an Italian painter, considered one of the most complex artists of the Southern Italian Post-World War II cultural landscape.

== Personal life ==
Olga Napoli was the daughter of Michele Napoli and Carmela Di Giovanni. After the death of her mother due to Spanish flu, Olga lived in the house of her paternal aunt who took care of her until the death of her husband. After the mourning period, Olga went to study in a women's college and completed her high school degree in 1923 with good grades at the Istituto Magistrale Regina Margherita.

In 1925 she married Attilio Argenziano, a World War I veteran who was eleven years older than her. They had three children: Giovanni (1927), Luciano (1928), and Vera (1930). Despite the economic troubles due to her antifascist ideas and her husband's lack of stable employment, Olga continued her work. She took part in the first and second shows of the Mostra femminile d'arte (Female Art Exhibition) and the Seconda Mostra Provinciale del Sindacato fascista di Belle Arti (Second Provincial Exhibition of the Fascist Union of Fine Arts), together with other spokespeople of the local artistic life: Olga Schiavo, Antonietta Casella Beraglia, Pasquale Avallone, and Luca Albino. Later, she also took part in the art exhibition organized by the Circolo "Donne Artiste e Laureate" (Association of Graduated Women Artists) and the II. Mostra Salernitana d'Arte in 1933. In 1935 she attended the Mostra Annuale d'Arte del Circolo Artistico "Gaetano Esposito" where, in 1942, she showed 38 canvases at a personal exhibition.

In 1933, while at the Circolo Artistico in Salerno, she met journalist Vincenzo Avagliano, who was also director of the Ceramiche D'Agostino factory in Vietri sul Mare; she left her husband for him and they had two daughters, Rosa (1934) and Carmela (1936). They married in 1949, after the death of her husband.

In 1944, once the war was over in Southern Italy, she took part at an exhibition set up at the seat of the Italian Red Cross in Salerno, inaugurated by then Prime Minister of Italy Pietro Badoglio and by military governor Brian Hubert Robertson. Between 1947 and 1948 she exhibited her artworks at the Second Rassegna della Ricostruzione di Salerno and the first Mostra Annuale Nazionale d’Arte (National Art Exhibition) in Cava de' Tirreni. In 1950 she again had a personal exhibition, this time at La Tavolozza gallery in Naples. Right after that, her paintings were selected for the fourth Michetti National Prize for Painting in Francavilla al Mare, to which she would also be invited in the future. In 1951 she attended the first Maggio di Bari painting exhibition, and the following year in the Galleria Gavioli in Milan there was another exhibition with more than forty canvases. In 1953 Napoli exhibited at Rome's Palazzo delle Esposizioni during the exhibition L'Arte nella vita del Mezzogiorno d'Italia (Art in the life of Southern Italy). She inaugurated a personal exhibition at the Circolo degli Artisti (Artists' Circle) of Turin; her artworks took part in the exhibition for the Premio Manerbio at Palazzo Venezia in Rome. Finally in 1954 she was selected for the Second Rassegna del disegno italiano contemporaneo (Exhibition of Italian contemporary drawing) in the loggias of the Uffizi in Florence. In 2009 a retrospective exhibition was dedicated to her career in Palazzo Sant'Agostino, home of the seat of the Province of Salerno.

== Style ==
Mario Carotenuto, a painter from Salerno who died in 2017, said about her:

Pur nella diversità dei giudizi, nei vari periodi della sua attività pittorica e della sua arte, la sua pittura resterà come l'esempio più importante finora compiuto a Salerno, per riallacciarsi alla moderna arte italiana.

— Mario Carotenuto
Translation:

Despite the different opinions, in the various periods of her painting activity and her art, her painting will remain as the most important example yet accomplished in Salerno of getting oneself reconnected with Italian modern art.

During her first exhibitions she depicted mainly floral themes, and most of these artworks are currently part of the collection at the Palazzo of the Camera di commercio of Salerno. Such artworks show a composition of light and shadow with an irregular brush, foreshadowing the expressive tone of the following decade. Her art departs from the classical Neapolitan themes of scenery and still life and opens to national and European influences acquired during her frequent travels.

Her style was inspired by tradition and is expressed through a pictorial language closer to realistic figurative art, with canvases of great chromatic richness, but with more intimate undertones similar to those of Filippo de Pisis.
