= Lodovico Vedriani =

Italian historian and priest

Lodovico Vedriani (1601-1670) was an Italian historian and priest from Modena. His writings spanned primarily the topics and annals of the Province of Modena, where lived and died on 9 February 1670, leaving much references to its historical background behind.

== Work ==
- Vedriani, Lodovico (1662). Soliano Stampator Ducale (ed.). Raccolta de Pittori, Scultori, Et Architetti Modonesi Piu Celebri. Modena: Per lo Soliani. p. 150. "Pittore.", published in 1662
- Vite et elogii de' cardinali Modonesi, published in 1662
- Dottori Modonesi di teologia, filosophia, legge canonica e civile, published in 1665
- Historia dell' antichissima città di Modona., published in 1666
