= Elvira Raimondi =

Italian painter (1866–1920)

Elvira Raimondi (1866–1920) was an Italian woman painter.

== Biography ==
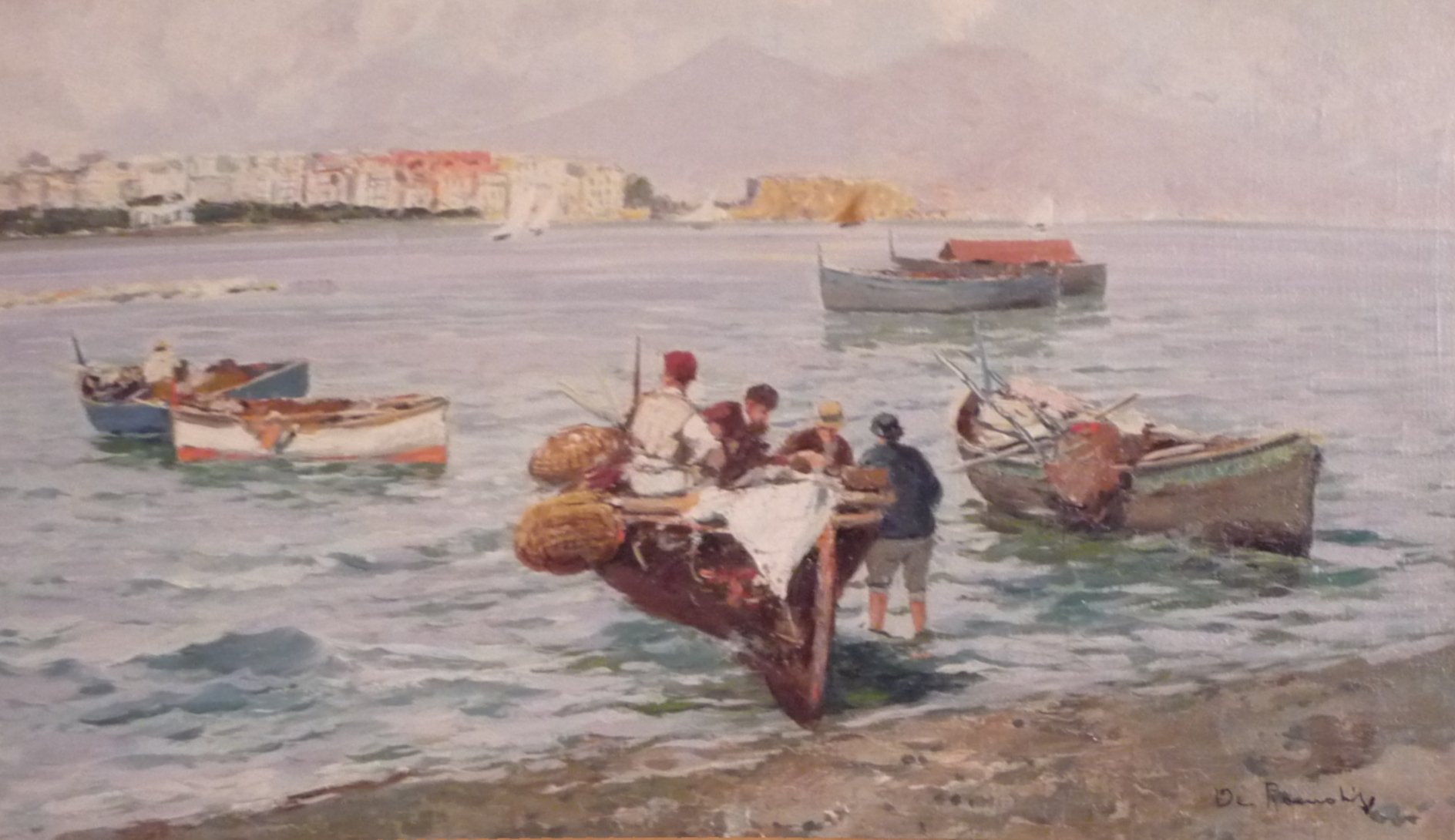
Fishermen in the bay of Naples

Raimondi was born in Naples in 1866, and she studied in the Academy of Fine Arts in Naples. She has among her works Mal tempo, Molo di Napoli; Sulla via di Minori; and Olga.

Raimondi died in 1920.
