= Paul Fioroni =

Canadian ice hockey player

- Born: August 7, 1976 (age 50) Calgary, Alberta, Canada
- Position: Left winger
- Played for: Lake Charles Ice Pirates (WPHL); Odessa Jackalopes (WPHL); Lubbock Cotton Kings (CHL)
- Playing career: 1997–2006

Paul Fioroni (born August 7, 1976) is a Canadian former professional ice hockey player and coach. He played ten seasons of professional hockey, notably serving as captain and player-assistant coach for the Lubbock Cotton Kings of the Central Hockey League (CHL). He is the only two-time recipient of the CHL Man of the Year award.

== Early life and junior career ==
Fioroni attended Sir Winston Churchill High School in Calgary, Alberta, and later studied at the Olds College School of Business. He played junior hockey for the Chilliwack Chiefs of the British Columbia Hockey League (BCHL). Known as a power forward, he became a rare member of junior hockey's informal "30/30 Club" by recording 30 goals and 30 fighting majors in a single season.

== Professional career ==
Fioroni began his professional career during the 1997–98 season in the Western Professional Hockey League (WPHL), splitting time between the Lake Charles Ice Pirates and the Odessa Jackalopes. During his rookie season, he led the league in both fighting majors and penalty minutes. Over his ten-year professional career, Fioroni attended multiple NHL training camps and appeared in pre-season games involving IHL and AHL teams. He also won a world championship playing roller hockey with the St. Louis Vipers of Roller Hockey International (RHI).

He spent his final five professional seasons with the Lubbock Cotton Kings of the Central Hockey League (CHL). Fioroni retired from playing following the 2005–06 CHL season to become the head coach of the Texas Tech University club ice hockey team.

== Philanthropy ==
In 2003, while playing with the Lubbock Cotton Kings, Fioroni founded the 24 Foundation, a charitable organization dedicated to raising funds for children with medical needs. In recognition of his leadership on the ice and his humanitarian contributions to the community, Fioroni was awarded the CHL Man of the Year award for both the 2004–05 and 2005–06 seasons. He is the only player in the history of the league to win the award twice.

== Awards and honours ==
Award	Year	Ref
CHL Man of the Year	2004–05	
CHL Man of the Year	2005–06	
