= Baroness Annetta Radovska =

Italian painter

Baroness Annetta Radovska or Annetta Borgna Radovska (Milan, 19th century) was a 19th-century woman painter in Lombardy, mainly depicting lively genre subjects.

She was a resident of Milan. Among her works were Vino vecchio, moglie giovane exhibited in 1881 at Milan. In 1883, again at Milan, she exhibited: Un aggressione; I fidanzali; and La visita. In 1883 at Rome, she exhibited: In visita e Nell' harem; and in 1884 at Turin Il The and Le quattro età. In 1886 at Milan, she exhibited Arriverà?.
