= Amalia Ciardi Dupré =

Italian sculptor and painter (1934–2024)

Amalia Ciardi Duprè (1934 – 25 November 2024) was an Italian sculptor and painter.

== Early life and education ==
Ciardi Duprè is the great-great granddaughter of sculptor Giovanni Duprè (1817–1882) and grand-niece to her namesake, artist Amalia Duprè (1842–1928), whose statue of Santa Reparata is on the façade of Florence’s Duomo. Amalia studied at the Academy of Fine Arts in Florence and later had working experiences in Milan and Rome. For about ten years, she taught at the Florence Artistic High School and Art Institute at Porta Romana while she organized personal art exhibitions in Italy and abroad. The experience of the end of the Second World War that obliged her family to escape from their house, created in Amalia a desire to become a peacemaker. Thus, during the Sixties and the Seventies, she produced art works to denounce war, drugs and every form of oppression within the modern world. Starting 1966, she collaborated with several architects including Luigi Bicocchi, Roberto Monsani, Raffaello Fagnoni and Pier Niccolò Berardi creating decorative cycles of sculpture and liturgical furnishings. From 1970 to 1987, she worked in the small chapel of San Lorenzo in Vincigliata, Florence, where she intended to display the "divine part of every human being" creating the work she called "the Bible for the poor".

== Work and style ==
Duprè’s works are found in many churches, squares and gardens throughout the world. Among her pieces, there is one near Settignano; the apse of the Chiesa di Santa Maria a Vincigliata is almost entirely her own work. One the largest terracotta reliefs in the world, it depicts scenes from the Old and New Testament. Sculptures by Amalia Ciardi Dupré are hosted in the church of San Bernardino in Borgunto, Fiesole, where all the art on display was created by women. Most of her works address maternity and female subjects. As a resident of Tuscany, much of Amalia's art is influenced by the Etruscan civilization. Many of her works are related to Christian religious themes and faith. In November 2015, the Amalia Ciardi Dupre Foundation opened the CAD Museum that has become an exhibition space housing more than half a century's worth of Dupre's terracotta and bronze sculptures and paintings.

Dupré died in Florence on 25 November 2024, at the age of 89.
