= Camilla Guerrieri =

Italian painter (1628–after 1693)

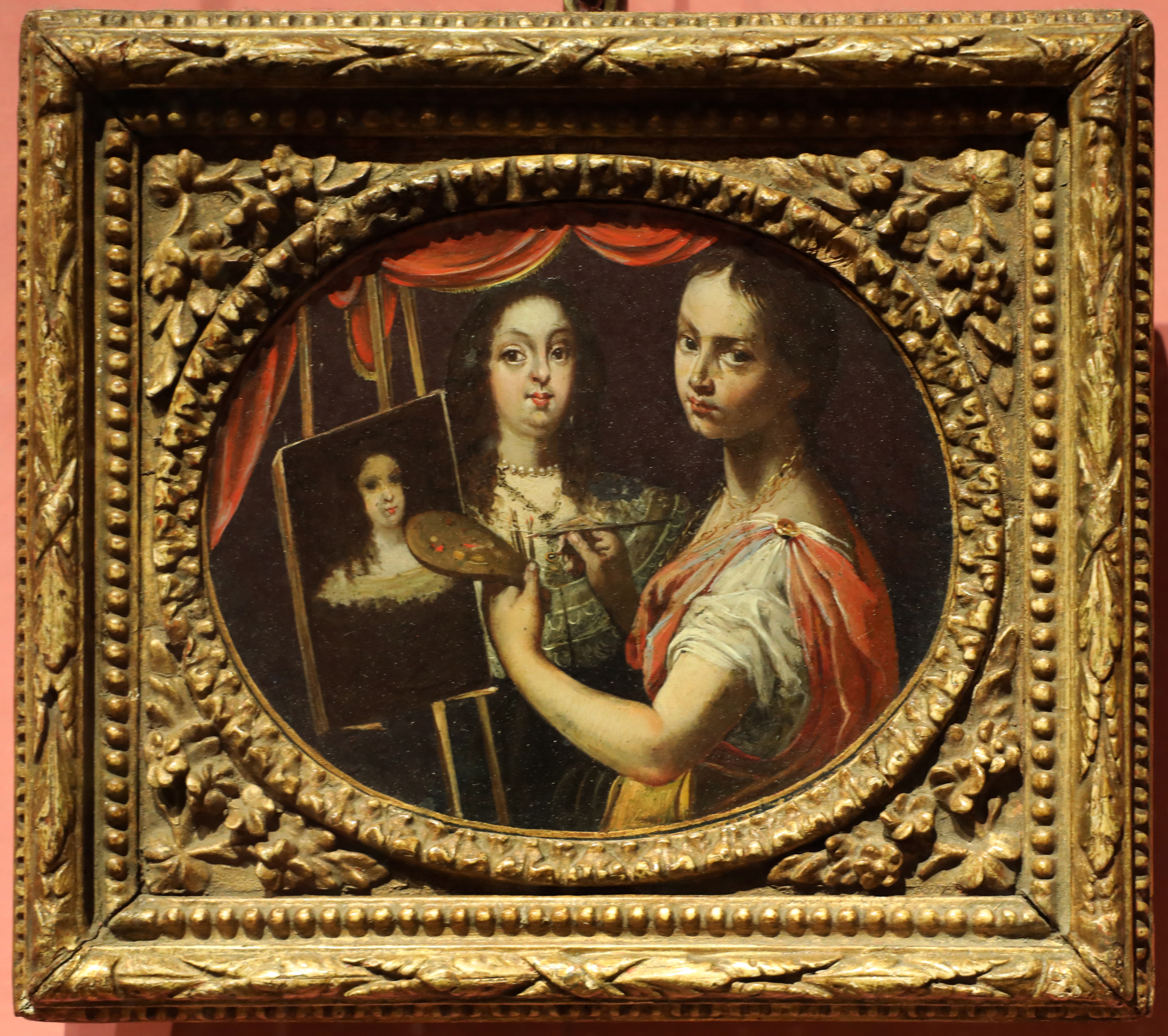
- Self-portrait of Camilla Guerrieri with Vittoria della Rovere, ca. 1640, at Uffizi Gallery
- Born: 1628; Fossombrone, Duchy of Urbino (now Italy)
- Died: after 1693; San Terenzo, Italy
- Spouse: Paolo de'Natti (m. 1655–)
- Father: Giovanni Francesco Guerrieri

Camilla Guerrieri (1628 – after 1693) was an Italian painter. She is believed to have worked as the first court painter for the House of Medici.

== Life and career ==
Camilla Guerrieri was born 1628, in Fossombrone, Duchy of Urbino (now Italy). Her father was artist Giovanni Francesco Guerrieri, who taught her how to paint. She married Paolo de'Natti in 1655, the castellan of the fortress of Pesaro.

In 1651 she painted a St. Jerome for Girolamo Giordano, a Pesaro nobleman. When Vittoria della Rovere become Grand Duchess consort of Tuscany, she moved from Pesaro to Florence and brought with her as a painter Camilla Guerrieri. Many of her works are missing or lost.

She died in the parish of San Terenzo. A monographic book was dedicated to her in 1999, and which other studies have appeared.

== See also ==
- List of Italian painters
- List of Italian women artists
