= Lida Persili =

Italian painter

Lida Persili (19th century) was an Italian painter, mainly of landscapes.

== Biography ==
Persili was born in Lombardy and lived in Milan. Among her masterworks are: La Sonno a Caprino; Lecco da Olginate; Veduta di Lecco; Lago di Como; L'Adda; Casolare; Pianura lombarda, and Val della Sonna. She exhibited in some Italian Exhibitions, among them the Promotrice of Florence, and the 1884 Turin Exhibition and other expositions at Rome.
