= Francesca Rognoni-Gratognini =

Italian painter

Francesca Rognoni-Gratognini (Milan, 1 October 1850 – 1938) was an Italian painter, mainly of landscapes.

== Biography ==
Born to a prominent Milanese family, she was not formally trained in an academy, but learned her craft from Gian Battista Lelli a teacher from her youth. She married the manuscript illuminator Giuseppe Grassis. She was active in Milan mainly as a landscape as well as a still-life painter. In 1881 at the Exhibition of Fine Arts in Milan, she exhibited three landscapes depicting Principio di bufera, Bel giorno di novembre, and In autunno. In 1887 at Venice, she exhibited a landscape, painted al vero. In 1886, at Milan she displayed Un'Alba in novembre. In 1884 at Turin, she exhibited: Marina; un Autunno; and Capo di Portofino.
