= Fanny Pieroni-Davenport =

Italian painter

Fanny Pieroni-Davenport was an Italian painter, active mainly in Florence, mainly of portraits.

== Biography ==
She was a resident of Florence. She exhibited at the Florentine Promotrice of 1889 and 1890. At the Mostra Beatrice di lavori femminili (of feminine works), she won a silver medal for her paintings. Her husband was the painter Antonio Pieroni.
