= Angelo Maria Scaccia =

Italian composer and violinist

Angelo Maria Scaccia (c. 1690 – 29 September 1761) was an Italian composer and violinist. He wrote fourteen concertos for the violin, including the major set of violin concertos, his Opus 1, a set of six, (Amsterdam, c. 1730), the first published by a Milanese composer. He also published a single concerto in 1736. Most of his other surviving works are scattered across a range of manuscript collections; including Pierre Philibert de Blancheton's Fonds Blancheton.

== Life and career ==
Born in Milan, Scaccia was the son of violinist Carlo Federico Scaccia (died 1751). He received his earliest musical education from his father, and in 1711 he was part of a large contingent of Milanese musicians who performed in Novara in celebration of the transfer of relics of San Gaudenzio di Novara. In 1720, he became a violinist at the Teatro Regio Ducale of Milan; a post he left but then resumed again in 1748. In 1751, he succeeded his father in his post of royal violinist and was awarded the title first ducal patente di violinista. He remained in that post until his death ten years later.
