= Teresa Fioroni-Voigt =

Italian artist (1799–1880)

- Born: Teresa Fioroni; 2 February 1799
- Died: 19 September 1880 (aged 81); Perugia, Italy
- Other name: Teresa Voigt
- Occupation: Miniature painter
- Spouse: Carl Friedrich Voigt (m. 1830)
- Children: Carolina and Ludovico
- Parents: Nicola Fioroni (father); Anna Rosa Pigliucci (mother)

Teresa Fioroni-Voigt (1799–1880) was an Italian painter who specialized in miniatures. Her small portraits were created on ivory.

== Life ==
Teresa Fioroni was the daughter of Nicola Fioroni and Anna Rosa Pigliucci, born on 2 February 1799, but details remain unknown.

Her early training as a painter is not documented however, Domenico Del Frate, a master painter of the time, lived the last two years of his life (1820–1821) in the same Roman building as the Fioroni family.

According to Hauser, Fioroni had first taken up portrait painting in oil, but her mother objected to the medium saying it was bad for her daughter's health. Fioroni then began creating miniatures and between 1820 and 1830, she became an established artist who received accolades for her work.

=== Munich ===
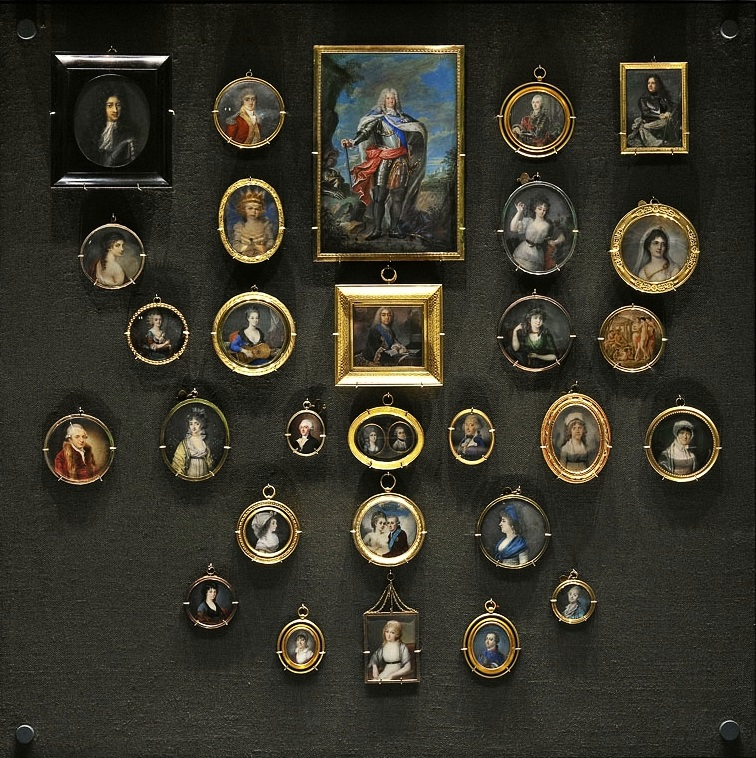
A sample collection of miniatures (not painted by Fioroni) on display in the National Museum in Warsaw.

On 30 March 1830, Fioroni married an engraver from Berlin, Carl Friedrich Voigt (1800–1874), who became a medalist in the Royal Mint of the Kingdom of Bavaria. In May 1839, the wife and husband moved to Munich, Bavaria, where Fioroni-Voigt later gave birth to their two children, Carolina and Ludovico.

Private correspondence (housed in the Vatican Library in Rome) and 30 miniature portraits (housed at the Accademia di San Luca, now called the Accademia Nazionale di San Luca) are known to have been painted by Fioroni-Voigt and "make it possible to evoke the life and the career of this Roman woman artist."

According to Treccani, the works she created in Munich include,

... miniature portraits of Louis I, King of Bavaria, his wife Teresa, his daughters Matilde and Adelgunda (their current location unknown); in the case of Queen Teresa, the portrait was replicated to adorn various jewels. By the same decades are the portraits of other members of the Bavarian royal family and the aristocrat society and politics, as well as those of her husband C. Vóigt and their children Carolina and Ludovico, the latter preserved in the Galleria dell'Accademia di S. Luca.

Some of Fioroni-Voigt's works have been lost and are known now only through citations or correspondence. Among these is the only known portrait of Baroness Bayersdoff (1831). Artwork credited to Fioroni includes about 30 items preserved at the Accademia di S. Luca "and the Portrait of two young women in front of an open window, from which we see St. Peter, in a private collection, the Portrait of a young woman dressed in red and the Portrait of a young woman with a large green hat, both in the Ferdinand Spiegel collection in Vienna." The Fioroni-Voigt miniatures were, as far as scholars know, all created on ivory.

=== Rome ===
In 1857 the family moved back to Rome where, between 1858 and 1865, they resided at 93 Via delle Tre Cannelle.

In 1860, her daughter Carolina married the Italian sculptor Francesco Fabi Altini (1830–1906) and the new couple lived with the Carolina's parents for several years. Fioroni-Voigt took that opportunity to make two portraits of Carolina's daughters Silvia and Augusta, before Augusta died prematurely.

=== Perugia ===
In 1874, Fioroni-Voigt's husband and daughter, Carolina, both died in Trieste (now part of Italy). Shortly after that time, the widow Fioroni moved to Perugia, Italy. She died there on 19 September 1880.

== Selected works ==
Of her many works of art, some remain lost and are known only through correspondence.

=== Writings ===
- Fioroni, Teresa, and Nardelli F. Petrucci. Briefe, Ital Lettere Artistiche E Familiari (Italian Artistic and Familiar Letters) 1830–1855, 1981. Print.

=== Works of art ===
- miniature portrait of Louis I, King of Bavaria
- miniature portrait of Queen Teresa of Bavaria
- miniature portraits of the royal daughters, Matilde and Adelgunda
- miniature portrait of granddaughter Silvia
- miniature portrait of granddaughter Augusta
- Portrait of Baroness Bayersdoff
- Portrait of two young women in front of an open window
- Portrait of a young woman dressed in red
- Portrait of a young woman with a large green hat
