= Linda Rocchi =

Italian painter

Linda Rocchi (9 July 1857 in Florence – ?) was an Italian painter, mainly of watercolors of flowers.

== Biography ==
Her husband, Giuseppe Rocchi (born 1854), was also a prominent watercolor artist. She was a resident of Genoa. She was described by Gubernatis as being attracted to a mysterious instinct regarding the happy (ridente) flora. In 1881, at the Milan Exhibition of Fine Arts, she depicted two tempera canvases of Flowers. Three years later in the same city she sent three paintings in tempera depicting a Ghirlanda nunziale; a Honey Moon; and a Biancospino; and three watercolors titled: Fior di amore; a "studio dal vero" titled: Spighe e cicala. She exhibited at the Expositions of Fine Arts of 1886 at Milan and 1887 of Venice: to the latter he sent four watercolors depicting wild flowers; and a tempera canvas depicting spring flowers. At Milan, she displayed three watercolors: Ranuncoli rossi; Fiori diversi, and a Pelargonio rosso; in addition an oil canvas of Rose con bacche d'edera; and another canvas of Rose in tempera.
