= Beatrice Scaccia =

Italian visual artist

- Born: 1978 (age 47–48); Frosinone, Italy
- Education: Accademia di Belle Arti di Roma
- Website: beascaccia-eve.com

Beatrice Scaccia (born 1978 - Frosinone, Italy), also known as Bea Scaccia, is an Italian visual artist and trained realist painter residing in New York City. Much of her work centers on a protagonist named Eve and other similar genderless characters, with hidden faces, that represent alter egos of the artist. Scaccia's gesso and wax drawings, monotype prints, sketches, paintings, and animations have been exhibited in solo exhibitions in Rome, Milan, and New York City. Her works are also held in the permanent collections of the Farnesina Experimenta at the Palazzo della Farnesina (the seat of the Italian Ministry of Foreign Affairs), the Galleria Comunale d'Arte Moderna e Contemporanea in Viareggio, Tuscany, and the William Louis-Dreyfus Foundation.

== Early life and education ==
Scaccia was born in Frosinone, Italy in 1978. She began her artistic career studying at Accademia di Belle Arti in Rome, Italy, where she met and started working with the artist Gino Marotta. In 2007, she began occasionally visiting New York City. In summer 2009, Scaccia entered a three-month studio-residency at Lower East Side Printshop in Manhattan, New York. She later returned to New York in 2011 to establish a permanent residence there. According to Scaccia, the city has had an influence on her work, "freed it, and perhaps made it more playful, more conscious."

== Career ==
Scaccia was trained as a realistic painter but after a few years, she abandoned that path, ridding herself of palettes, materials, and opting for drawings in pencils and gesso. Her first solo exhibition He, she, it: masculine, feminine and neuter gender was exhibited at the Ugo Ferranti Gallery in Rome. It included a multitude of chronological sketches depicting a genderless individual grappling with their sexuality, attempting to dress in both feminine and masculine clothing, and with an ever-present strap-on sex toy among the various articles of attire. The sequence of developmental sketches culminated in a collection of monotype prints followed by three finished wax drawings.

Her technique was influenced by how beeswax is used on furniture and similarly from its use in the Batik technique. She later incorporated paper techniques from workshops she attended in New York.

In 2013, Scaccia exhibited her second body of work entitled The Perfect Stage at the BOSI Contemporary Gallery in New York. In the same period, she had begun working at the art studio of Jeff Koons. In The Perfect Stage, the genderless character that is the subject of her work could be seen to take shape. The exhibition included a series of fifteen drawings, an audio narration, and two video installations. These drawings also began to introduce color. Scaccia, who had previously abandoned painting, started in that body of work to gradually reintroduce colors back into her works but only in a single hue: a glazed, almost Flemish red. The narrative voice played in the background was written by the artist and is similar to a theatrical monologue included "rhetorical questions… posed with dramatic humor and anguish, moods in which Scaccia engages in the inner battles of her character." To create the animation, Scaccia had enrolled in a course at the School of Visual Art in Manhattan.

In 2014, she began a residency at the Residency Unlimited in Brooklyn, New York. It was at Residency Unlimited's event space that she held her third solo exhibition entitled Little Gloating Eve in February 2014. The exhibition was presented again at the Effearte in Milan, Italy, as well as at the Cuchifritos Gallery in New York. In Little Gloating Eve, the artist demonstrates the entire evolution of her subject Eve beginning with the animation At least a snake, originally created for the project Patria Interiore (2012) which was curated by Manuela Pacella, and exhibited at the Golden Thread Gallery in Belfast, Northern Ireland. The culmination of the character's evolution, Little Gloating Eve also features several collaborative works with other artists including a ceramic installation by Japanese artist Toshiaki Noda, a soundtrack by French musician Lionel Laquerrière, and a collection of 96 drawings made by children at an Italian elementary school reinterpreting the character.

In 2016, Scaccia was selected for a residency at the Woodstock Byrdcliffe Guild. Scaccia's fourth solo exhibit Call the Bluff featured several new pieces specifically created for the Cara Gallery exhibit. The works explore the artist's fascination with "random and repetitive gestures of everyday life." According to Marie Claire's Germano D'Acquisto, the characters in her work seem to be "suspended in a state of indecision between what has been done and what will soon happen. They appear frozen and melancholic, perhaps stuck in a state of perennial indecision."

In 2018, Scaccia had a solo exhibition, Is There an Outside? at the Ricco Maresca Gallery in New York. The exhibition included mixed media pieces, animation, and a series of monochromatic two-sided works depicting figures emerging from rough-hewn shapes and limbs cloaked in clothing. In July 2020, Scaccia participated in the special project, Homemade, organized and sponsored by Magazzino Italian Art. Homemade was launched as a digital program during the global quarantine and culminated with an in-person exhibition of the new works created during the program. Eight New York-based Italian artists were invited: Alessandro Teoldi, Andrea Mastrovito, Beatrice Scaccia, Danilo Correale, Davide Balliano, Francesco Simeti, Luisa Rabbia, and Maria D. Rapicavoli.

In 2021, she had her first museum show My Hope Chest, at the Katonah Museum of Art, showcasing a stop-motion animation and site-specific wall drawings. The animation was realized thanks to the grant that was awarded to her by the Queens Council in 2020.

In 2022, she had her first solo exhibition (composed entirely) of paintings at JDJ Gallery in New York in a show titled With Their Striking Features.

== Solo exhibitions ==
- He, she, it: masculine, feminine and neuter gender (2010), Ugo Ferranti Gallery, Rome, Italy.
- The Perfect Stage (2013), BOSI Contemporary, New York City, New York, U.S.
- Little Gloating Eve (2014), Residency Unlimited, New York City, New York, U.S.
- Little Gloating Eve (2014), Effearte Gallery, Milan, Italy.
- Little Gloating Eve (2014), Cuchifritos Gallery, New York City, New York, U.S.
- Call the Bluff (2016), Cara Gallery, Manhattan, New York, U.S.
- Is There an Outside? (2018), Ricco Maresca Gallery, New York, U.S.
- Homemade (2020), Magazzino Italian Art in Cold Spring, New York, U.S.
- My Hope Chest (2021), Katonah Museum of Arts, Katonah, New York, U.S.
- With Their Striking Features, JDJ Gallery, New York, US
- Wrap Yourself In This Skin. Maruani Mercier, Art Brussels, Brussels.
