= Daniela Benedini =

Italian painter

- Born: May 24, 1972; Desio, Italy
- Known for: Trompe L'Oeil

Daniela Benedini (born May 24, 1972, in Desio, Italy) is an Italian painter and decorator who specializes in trompe-l'œil art.

== Artistic background ==
Benedini studied painting at Brera Academy of Milan, Italy where she graduated in 1994 with a study on The Trompe-l'œil in the History of Art.

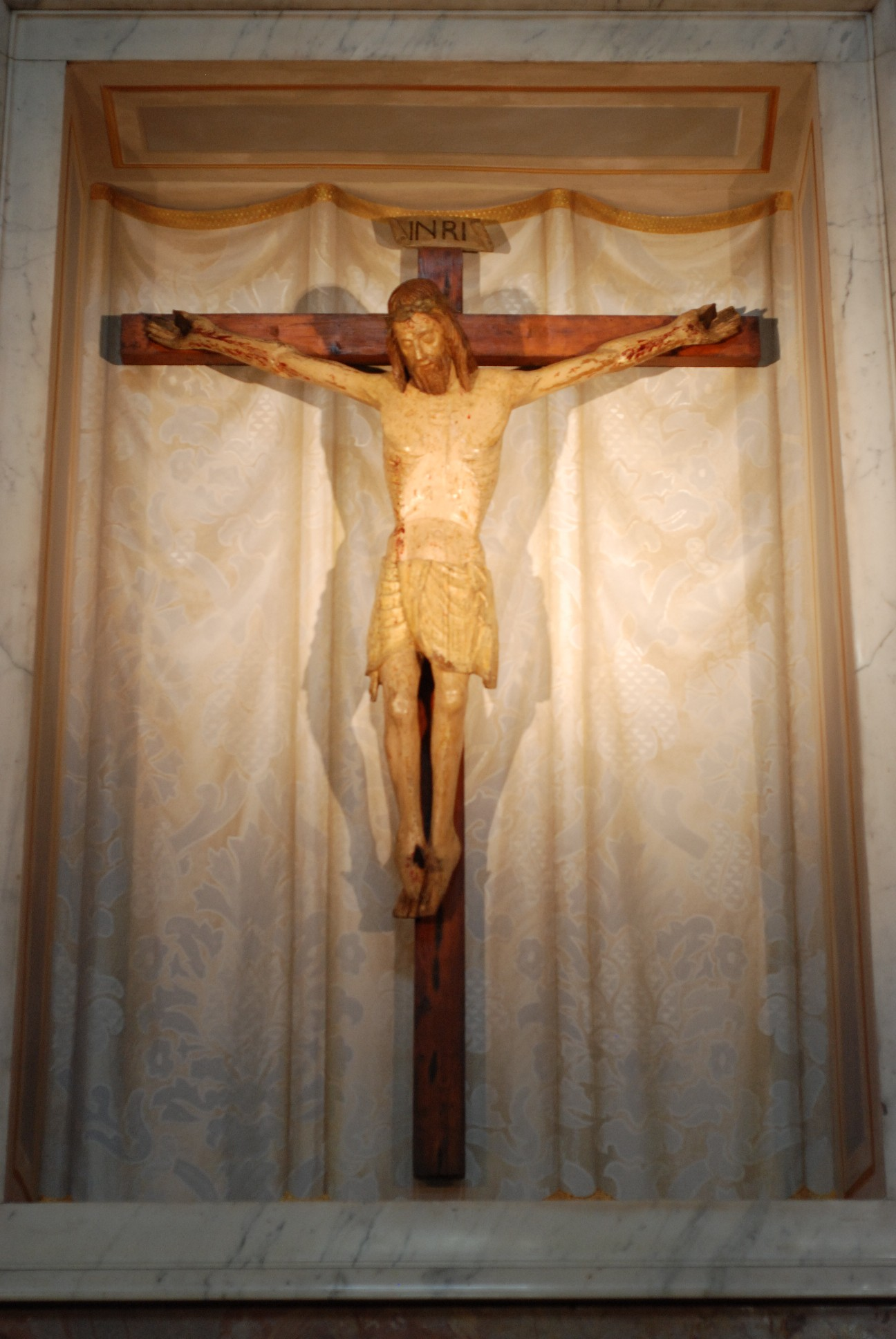
Velo Damascato Basilica Romana Minore di Desio, Italy

== Works ==
She has been commissioned murals and decorations for several public buildings and private residences in Italy, Peru, Kazakhstan, Kuwait, Greece, etc.

These include the Basilica of Desio, the Public Hospital of Desio, the San Gerardo Hospital in Monza, the Bergamonti Square in Misinto (Italia) and the Cathedral of Chimbote (Peru).

- Velo Damascato, 2009, Basilica di Desio (Italia)
- Favole in Ospedale, 1997, Ospedale di Monza (Italia)

== Awards ==
- Best Artwork at the International trompe-l'œil festival in 2005
- Special Award "Ordine degli Architetti Pianificatori Paesaggistici e Conservatori della Provincia di Lodi" at the International trompe-l'œil festival in 2007
