= List of Italian Renaissance women artists =

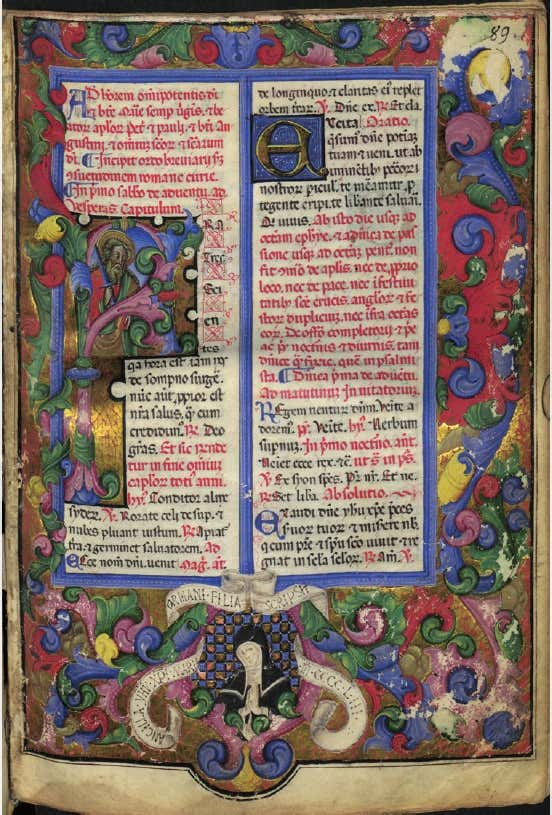
Marginal self-portrait of Maria Ormani, 1453.

Italian Renaissance female artists (Italian: Le donne pittrici del Rinascimento italiano) included painters, manuscript illustrators and sculptors who lived in Italy in the 15th–16th centuries.

For other countries see List of 16th-century women artists.

== List ==
=== 15th century ===
- Onorata Rodiani (1403–1452) – semi-legendary painter
- Catherine of Bologna (Caterina de' Vigri) (1413–1463) – nun, artist, writer, later saint
- Maria Ormani (1428–c.1470) – manuscript illustrator and nun
- Elena de Laudo (fl. 1445) – Venetian glass artist.
- Antonia Doni (Antonia di Paolo di Dono, Antonia Uccello) (1446–1491) – painter, daughter of Paolo Uccello. Mentioned in documents as "pittoressa" – first usage of feminine term. Nun.
- Barbara Ragnoni (1448 – 1533) – painter, nun
- Eufrasia Burlamacchi (1482–1548) – manuscript illuminator, nun
- Marietta Barovier (fl. 1496) – Venetian glass artist

=== 16th century ===
More than 25 women active in 20 cities from Venice to Naples have been recorded as artists during the Cinquecento. Most were painters, but 2 were called intagliatrici, 4 (all Milanesi) ricamatrici, Properzia De'Rossi was the sole scultrice.

- Properzia de' Rossi (1490–1530) – sculptor, the only woman to receive a biography in 1st edition of Vasari's Lives of the Artists.
- Teodora Danti (c.1498–c.1573) – painter, writer. Aunt of sculptor Vincenzo Danti.
- Plautilla Nelli (1524–1588) – painter, nun. Her disciples: Suor Prudenza Cambi, Suor Agata Trabalesi, Suor Maria Ruggieri, and three others as additional producers: Suor Veronica, Suor Dionisia Niccolini, and his sister Suor Maria Angelica Razzi.
- Anguissola family:
  - Sofonisba Anguissola (c.1532–1625), painter
  - Elena Anguissola (c.1532–1584), painter
  - Lucia Anguissola (c.1538 – c.1565), painter
- Irene di Spilimbergo (1540–1559) – painter and poet
- Lucrezia Quistelli della Mirandola (1541–1594), painter countess
- Diana Scultori Mantuana (1547–1612) – engraver, daughter of the sculptor and engraver Giovanni Battista Ghisi. One of the first female engravers.
- Mariangiola Criscuolo (c.1548–1630) – painter, daughter of painter Giovanni Filippo Criscuolo.
- Cecilia Brusasorzi (1549 – 1593) – painter, daughter of painter Domenico Brusasorzi.
- Barbara Longhi (1552–1638) – painter, daughter of painter Luca Longhi
- Lavinia Fontana (1552–1614) – painter, daughter of painter Prospero Fontana. First female career artist in Western Europe as she relied on commissions for her income.
- Marietta Robusti (La Tintoretta) (c.1560–1590) – painter, daughter of Tintoretto
- Maria Angelica Razzi (16th century) – sculptor, nun

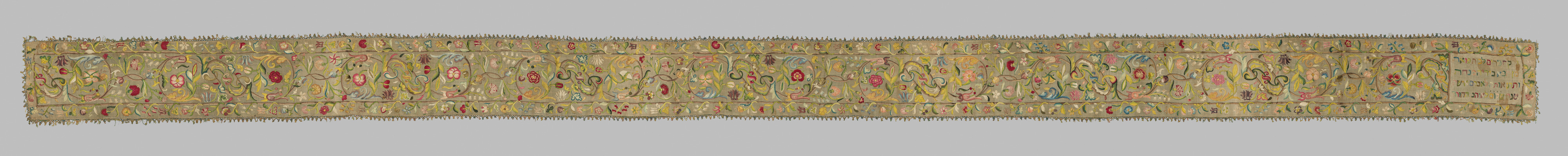
Torah binder attributed to embroidery artist Miriam Foa, 1615–1616.

=== Baroque female artists ===
- Geronima Parasole (1569–1622) – wood block cutter and print maker
- Isabella Parasole (c.1570–c.1620) – wood engraver
- Fede Galizia (1578 – c. 1630) – pioneering still-life painter, daughter of painter Nunzio Galizia.
- Chiara Varotari (1584–1663) – painter, daughter of painter Dario Varotari the Elder
- Lucrina Fetti (c.1590–1651) – painter, daughter of painter Pietro Fetti, nun
- Angelica Veronica Airola (c.1590–1670) – painter, nun
- Caterina Ginnasi (1590–1660) – painter, niece of cardinal
- Artemisia Gentileschi (1593–c.1656), painter
- Orsola Maddalena Caccia (1596–1676) – religious mannerist painter, daughter of painter Guglielmo Caccia, nun
- Maria Eufrasia della Croce (1597–1676) – nun, painter
- Arcangela Paladini (1599–1622) – painter, daughter of painter Filippo Paladini
- Giovanna Garzoni (1600–1670) – painter, niece of painter Pietro Gaia
- Miriam Foa (active 1615–1616) – Judaica embroidery artist, featured in exhibitions by the Metropolitan Museum of Art and Boston Museum of Fine Arts.
- Elisabetta Sirani (1638–1665) – painter and etcher from Bologna

== See also ==
- Art by Women in Florence (book)
- Invisible Women: Forgotten Artists of Florence (book)
- Advancing Women Artists Foundation

== Bibliography ==
- Ambrogio Levati. Donne illustri. 1822
- Gadol, Joan Kelly, Did Women have a Renaissance?, in: Renate Bridenthal, Claudia Koonz, Becoming Visible. Women in European History, Boston 1970.
- Graziani, Irene (2021). Le Signore dell'Arte. Storie di donne tra '500 e '600.
- King, Margaret L., Simpson, Catherine L., Women of the Renaissance, University of Chicago Press 1991.
- Garrard, Mary D., Angouissola and the Problem of the Woman Artist, Renaissance Quarterly 24, 1994.
- Zwanger, Meryl, Women and Art in the Renaissance, in: Sister, Columbia University 1995/6.
- Judith Brown. Gender and Society in Renaissance Italy (Women And Men In History). 1998
- Letizia Panizza, Women in Italian Renaissance Culture and Society. Oxford, 2000. ISBN 1-900755-09-2.
- Mary Rogers, Paola Tinagli. Women in Italy, 1350—1650.. Manchester University Press, 2005
- Gaia Servadio. Renaissance woman. 2005
- Nicholson, Elizabeth S. G. "Diana Scultori." Italian Women Artists from Renaissance to Baroque: National Museum of Women in the Arts. Milano: Skira, 2007
- Anne Sutherland Harris. Sofonisba, Lavinia, Artemisia, and Elisabetta: Thirty Years after Women Artists, 1550–1950. 2017
- Robin, Diana Maury, Larsen, Anne R. and Levin, Carole. Encyclopedia of women in the Renaissance: Italy, France, and England. — ABC-CLIO, Inc, 2007. — P. 160—161.
- Sheila Barker. Women Artists in Early Modern Italy: Careers, Fame, and Collectors. 2016
- Tanja L. Jones (ed.). Women Artists in the Early Modern Courts of Europe. c. 1450–1700
- Fortunati, Vera, Jordana Pomeroy, and Claudio Strinati, Italian Women Artists from Renaissance to Baroque, Milan, Skira, 2007

== See also ==
- List of Italian women artists
