= Invisible Women: Forgotten Artists of Florence =

Invisible Women: Forgotten Artists of Florence is a 2009 book in English and Italian by Jane Fortune through the Advancing Women Artists Foundation (AWA) and published by The Florentine Press. The book describes the history of female artists in Florence and their hundreds of works in the city's museums or storehouses. AWA has rediscovered at least 2,000 works by women artists that have been forgotten in museum attics and churches of Florence, and they have restored more than 60 paintings so far. Contributing authors include Linda Falcone, Serena Padovani, Rosella Lari and Sheila Barker. It has twenty-six chapters on thirty-five women artists active in Florence.

The book was the basis of a five-part Emmy award winning television documentary, produced by WFYI Productions, which was first broadcast on PBS in 2012.

== Description ==
Invisible Women discusses female artistic influence in Florence starting with the first known Florentine nun-artist Suor Plautilla Nelli. It describes the city as a center for women court artists in the Baroque period as exemplified by the teacher-student succession of Giovanna Fratellini, Violante Siries Cerroti, and Anna Bacherini Piattoli. Other chapters highlight painters granted the honor of displaying their self-portrait in the Vasari Corridor such as the Venetian Giulia Lama, the first woman known to draw and study the male nude from a live model, and Marietta Robusti, the daughter of Tintoretto who was often called "La Tintoretta." The book covers still-life painters such as Maria Van Oosterwyck and Margherita Caffi best known for her elaborate bouquets with freely hanging wild flowers. Fortune focuses on six specific buildings in Florence including the Marucelliana Library, the Last Supper Museum of Andrea del Sarto, and the Gallery of Modern Art in the Pitti Palace. Other chapters include work on Sofonisba Anguissola whose admirers included Michelangelo and Anthony van Dyck; Lavinia Fontana, the first female painter in Western Europe to reach the same level of professional acclaim as her male contemporaries; Artemisia Gentileschi who created large-scale images of heroines; and seventeenth-century pastelist Rosalba Carriera known for her Rococo style and flattering portraits of the wealthy.

Invisible Women: Forgotten Artists of Florence focuses on oil paintings, pastels, watercolors, and drawings. The chapters are followed by The Woman Artists' Trail, a map and an inventory of works by women artists in Florence, which was later adapted into the separate, pocket-size guidebook, Art by Women in Florence: A Guide through Five Hundred Years.

== Documentary ==
Producer Todd Gould and executive producer Clayton Taylor worked with Fortune and the AWA to produce a five-part television documentary. It describes a six-year project to research, restore, and exhibit works of art by women in Florence's museums and storage covering the restoration of works by three artists: Plautilla Nelli, Artemisia Gentileschi, and Irene Parenti Duclos who is the only woman featured in Florence's Accademia Gallery today. The documentary illustrates main themes featured in the book along with additional interviews with the Advancing Women Artists Foundation team, restoration experts, and executives from several museums in the United States and from the Polo Museale Florentino.

WFYI Productions filmed the documentary which included footage provided by The Florentine Press, Artmedia, and Bunker Film. It first aired in the U.S. on PBS in Indianapolis on November 5, 2012.

On June 1, 2013, the documentary won an Emmy Award as Best Documentary in the Cultural/Historical Program category by the regional National Academy of Television Arts and Sciences.

== Partial list of women artists mentioned (listed in the order named in the book) ==
- Suor Plautilla Nelli (1524–1588)
- Giovanna Fratellini (1666–1731)
- Violante Siries Cerroti (1709–1783)
- Anna Bacherini Piattoli (1720–1788)
- Luisa Silei (1825–1898)
- Fillide Giorgi Levasti (1883–1966)
- Beatrice Ancillotti Goretti (1879–1937)
- Maria Maddalena Gozzi (1718–1782)
- Emma Bardini Tozzi (1883–1962)
- Arcangela Paladini (1599–1622)
- Giulia Lama (1681–1747)
- Marietta Robusti (c. 1552 – 1590)
- Élisabeth Louise Vigée-Le Brun (1755–1842)
- Angelica Kauffmann (1741–1807)
- Rosa Bonheur (1822–1899)
- Rachel Ruysch (1664–1750)
- Clara Peeters (1594-post-1657)
- Maria Van Oosterwyck (1630–1693)
- Rachel Ruysch (1664–1750)
- Giovanna Garzoni (1600–1670)
- Margherita Caffi (1650–1710)
- Irene Parenti Duclos (1754–1795)
- Maria Hadfield Cosway (1760–1838)
- Elisabetta Sirani (1638–1665)
- Louisa Grace Bartolini (1818–1865)
- Elisabeth Chaplin (1892–1982)
- Adriana Pincherle (1907–1996)
- Leonetta Cecchi Pieraccini (1882–1977)
- Sofonisba Anguissola (1532–1625)
- Lavinia Fontana (1552–1614)
- Artemisia Gentileschi (1593–1653)
