= Ippolito Galantini =

Ippolito Galantini may refer to:

- Ippolito Galantini (painter) (1627–1706), Italian painter of the Baroque period
- Ippolito Galantini (teacher) (1565–1619), Italian Roman Catholic founder of the Congregation of Christian Doctrine of Florence
