= Razzi (surname) =

Razzi is an Italian surname. Notable people with the surname include:

- Antonio Razzi (born 1948), Italian politician
- Claudia Razzi (born 1962), Italian voice actress and dubbing director
- Maria Angelica Razzi, Italian sixteenth century nun and sculptor
- Ottobuono di Razzi (died 1315), Italian clergyman and feudal lord, Patriarch of Aquileia
- Serafino Razzi (1531–1613), Italian Dominican friar
