= Violante Ferroni =

Florentine painter

Violante Ferroni (born August 19, 1720) was a baroque painter from Florence, Grand Duchy of Tuscany. She was a very successful woman for her time, creating two large commissions for the San Giovanni di Dio Hospital in Florence.

== Education ==
At the age of 16, Ferroni was admitted to the Accademia delle Arti del Disegno. The academy typically catered toward mid-career artists rather than teenagers, therefore Ferroni's admittance was a testimony of her skill. The director of this academy, Niccolo Gabburri, even wrote a short biography in regards to Ferroni's talent where he states

This witty and respectable young lady, after an in-depth and careful study of drawing, is now, in 1740, at the age of about 20, learning to paint portraits and historical scenes using oil paint and pastels. Her talent is most evident when she paints scenes of her own composition with oil paints, a medium in which she is also adept at color mixing. So, Florence has reason to hope that she, in time, will get better and better at painting, especially because she is so enamored of art that she never gets tired of improving her technique.

Beyond the academy, Ferroni had three teachers who were prominent within the art world of the time: Violante Siries Cerroti, Giovanni Domenico Ferretti, and Vincenzo Meucci.

== Artwork ==
=== San Giovanni Di Dio Hospital ===
Ferroni was awarded a commission of two 8 by 11.5 feet oval paintings for the atrium of the San Giovanni Di Dio Hospital in the mid-1700s. These signed ovals depict two religious scenes of Saint John of God, one titled Saint John of God Ministering to Plague Victims, and the other titled Saint John Giving Bread to the Poor. Ferroni's monumental paintings were installed at the top of the double staircase that adorned the main entry to the hospital. The paintings use dramatic color and loose brushwork, indicating Ferroni's boldness as a painter. The two paintings differ in terms of style, technique and composition.

Saint John Giving Bread to the Poor is a painting with a strong male presence and few female figures. The painting depicts a man in a black cloak handing bread to another man with a group of men in black cloaks carrying bread. There are many other figures along the outskirts including one man with his back toward us shown with strong musculature, indicating Ferroni's interest in anatomy.

Saint John of God Ministering to Plague Victims features mostly women with a more intimate atmosphere. The painting depicts few figures. The same man as in Saint John Giving Bread to the Poor is depicted again in a black cloak, this time hunched over with his thumb on the forehead of a baby. There is a woman holding the baby and a few other women and children in the area surrounding the main scene.

==== Conservation and restoration ====
The restoration project, funded by the Advancing Women Artists Foundation, began by creating a scaffolding in order to remove the paintings from the high walls of the atrium. They were then transferred to the studio, where conservators Elizabeth Wicks and Marina Vincenti conducted a diagnostic photographic investigation in order to identify issues with the painting for restoration. The next step was cleaning and identifying the artistic technique used within the paintings. Following this phase structural issues were addressed. This process included consolidation, also known as the treatment that aims to stabilize degraded or weakened areas by introducing an adhesive, also called a consolidant. Then they applied strips of fabric around the painting's border and stretched the painting and new fabric over a new stretcher to preserve the original canvas from further damage. Pictorial reintegration was the next phase, where the conservators filled flaking paint mirroring the surrounding technique. Lastly, varnish was applied before returning the paintings to their rightful home in the atrium of the San Giovanni Di Dio Hospital. The restoration was completed in 2020.

=== Other artwork ===
Ferroni created many other paintings that have now been lost to history. Her work was exhibited in the Academy of San Luca in 1737 and 1776, as well as at the Uffizi Gallery. The pieces were reported to be a copy of a Luca Giordano, a copy of a Guido Reni, and a copy of the Martyrdom of Saint Bartholomew by Giovanni Domenico Ferretti.
