= Art by Women in Florence =

2012 book by Jane Fortune and Linda Falcone

Art by Women in Florence: A Guide through Five Hundred Years
- Author: Jane Fortune
- Publication date: 2012

Art by Women in Florence: A Guide through Five Hundred Years is a 2012 book written by Jane Fortune and Linda Falcone through The Advancing Women Artists Foundation and published by The Florentine Press. Art by Women in Florence is adapted from the book Invisible Women: Forgotten Artists of Florence as a pocket-size guidebook through Florence's museums showcasing over eighty paintings and sculptures by more than sixty women artists.

Proceeds derived from Art by Women in Florence support projects sponsored by the Advancing Women Artists Foundation in their work to research, restore, and exhibit artwork by women in Florence's museums and storehouses.

== Description ==
Art by Women in Florence: A Guide through Five Hundred Years is divided into eight sections, including a brief segment on unexhibited paintings, and provides a fold-out map of Florence delineating twenty locations housing viewable artwork. (See full list below.)

The book points to a number of religious paintings in Florence's churches including works by Suor Plautilla Nelli, the city's first known woman artist (2) such as her Lamentation with Saints in the San Marco Museum. Visitors to Santa Maria del Carmine will find a burial monument by Félice de Fauveau, considered to be one of the most preeminent marble sculptures of the nineteenth century. Art by Women in Florence spotlights Artemisia Gentileschi, a seventeenth-century Baroque master known to depict historical and mythical heroines. A significant portion of the guide showcases self-portraiture in the Vasari Corridor. These protagonists include the wildly popular Angelica Kauffmann whose work inspired designs for high-class housewares at the peak of the Industrial Revolution and Cecilia Beaux the earliest American invited to contribute to the Corridor's self-portrait collection. (2) Art by Women in Florence guides the reader to the outskirts of Florence to explore various Medici villas hosting works by numerous women including Lavinia Fontana, the first female painter to receive a public commission in Italy, and seventeenth-century court artist Giovanna Fratellini.

== Locations listed on the Map ==
1. Santa Maria del Fiore (the Duomo)
2. Casa Buonarroti
3. Santa Croce
4. Uffizi Gallery
5. Print and Drawings Collection
6. Vasari Corridor
7. Palatine Gallery
8. Gallery of Modern Art
9. Silver Museum
10. Gabinetto S. L. G. P. Viesseux
11. Santa Maria del Carmine
12. Santa Maria Novella
13. Proc. Gen. Repubblica
14. Oblate Gallery
15. Santa Maria Maddalena dei Pazzi
16. Accademia Gallery
17. Marucelliana Library
18. San Marco Museum
19. Innocenti Museum
20. S. Salvi Museum
