= Dazzi =

Dazzi is a surname. Notable people with the surname include:

- Arturo Dazzi (1881–1966), Italian painter and sculptor
- Cecilia Dazzi (born 1969), Italian actress, television personality, and songwriter
- Romano Dazzi (1905–1976), Italian artist

== See also ==
- Razzi (surname)
