= Félicie de Fauveau =

French sculptor

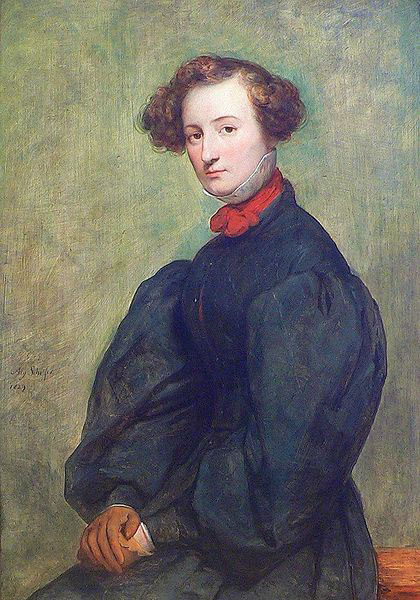
Portrait of Félicie de Fauveau by Ary Scheffer

Félicie de Fauveau (1801, in Livorno – 1886, in Florence) was a nineteenth-century French sculptor who was a precursor of the pre-Raphaelite style. She worked in a variety of techniques and mediums, including marble, stone, glass and bronze.

== Early life ==
Born in Tuscany in 1801, De Fauveau moved to France at the peak of the Restoration, after having spent her childhood in Florence. In Paris, she studied painting and sculpture and cultivated an interest in archeology and ancient symbolism, establishing a studio in Paris from 1826 to 1830, at 18 Rue de la Rochefoucauld, which was frequented by artists such as Paul Delaroche and Ary Scheffer.

== Artistic debut ==
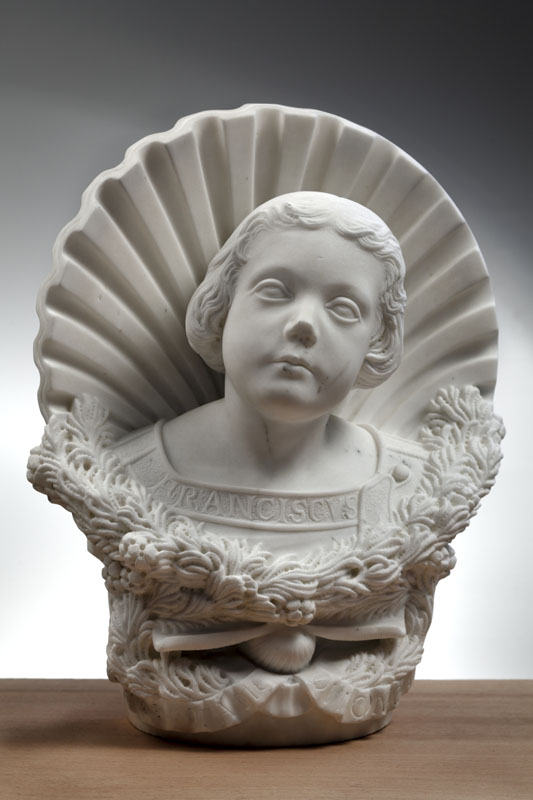
Buste funéraire d'un enfant (after 1833)

After her participation at the Paris Salon in 1827, De Fauveau received ample acclaim. Stendhal called her the ‘new Canova’. One of the statues she presented at the event, Queen Christine of Sweden Refusing to Spare the Life of Her Equerry Monaldeschi, was awarded the gold medal, which the artist received from King Charles X, who looked to De Fauveau to promote the ideals of the Restoration. Her award-winning statue would also inspire Alexandre Dumas’s play Christine. In Paris, she subsequently received multiple commissions including bronze doors destined for the Louvre, a project that failed to reach fulfilment.

== Politics and voluntary exile in Florence ==
A dedicated Legitimist, who supported the return of the Bourbon king to France after the fall of Napoleon, de Fauveau was supported by Marie Caroline, Duchess of Berry. Both women organized failed resistance efforts in the Vendée region. De Fauveau hoped the crown would be captured by Marie Caroline's under-aged son, the Count of Chambord. After two squelched uprisings in the early 1830s and six months in prison, De Fauveau joined her mother in Florence in 1834, where she vowed to remain in voluntary exile until the Count of Chambord was crowned king of France, a hope that never materialized.

== Friends and commissioners ==
During her time in Florence, De Fauveau cultivated many friendships with artistic and literary personalities. She was welcomed to the Grand Duchy by neoclassic Florentine sculptor Lorenzo Bartolini, who is thought to have trained her. She established a studio on Via degli Serragli, which became a point of interest for international travelers on the Grand Tour. Her admirers included Italian opera singer Angelica Catalani and Elizabeth and Robert Browning, who had also made their home in Florence. De Fauveau's works were coveted by the city's Russian ex-pats including Anatoly Nikolaievich Demidov, 1st Prince of San Donato; the artist received multiple commissions from the industrialist and enjoyed the friendship of his wife Princess Mathilde Bonaparte, niece of Napoleon. The Tsar Nicolas I purchased various works from the artist and his daughter Maria Nikolaieva was given a dagger, now at the Louvre, whose handle is engraved with scenes from Shakespeare's Romeo and Juliet.

== Themes and style ==
De Fauveau was inspired by literary, political and religious themes. She was particularly interested in Monarchism and emulated medieval styles to support this political system in her art work. She was also known for including Christian symbolism in her work. A representative of the troubadour style, De Fauveau's Florentine works include an ornate Neo-Gothic holy water font at the Pitti Palace and the monumental tombs of Sir Charles Lyon Herbert and Lady Harriet Frances Pellew, at the English Cemetery in Piazzale Donatello. Her Florentine masterworks include her sculptural tribute to West-Indian poet Louise de Favreau in the loggia of the Basilica of Santa Croce, which, according to De Fauveau scholar Silvia Mascalchi, was inspired by a poem the girl had written before her death at age seventeen. Santa Maria del Carmine's Monument to Anne de la Pierre, which the artist created in 1859 depicts a realistic portrait of Fauveau's mother.

She was buried in the central chapel of the San Felice a Ema cemetery, on a hill south of Florence.

== Restorations ==
In 2012 and 2013, De Fauveau's Sepulcher for Louise de Favreau and Monument to Anne de la Pierre were at the center of a restoration and maintenance project sponsored by the Advancing Women Artists Foundation (AWA). Both monuments had been damaged when the Arno River flooded Florence in 1966. With regards to the first restoration, author and AWA Founder Jane Fortune writes, ‘Restorers had the opportunity to discover more about de Fauveau's sculptural methods which differed from those of her contemporaries who were intent on copying Donatello. She used flat and toothed chisels to create linear movement and most likely learned carving techniques by working on medallions.’ The artist's base-relief of Florence behind the figure of de Favreau is an example of her technique. During the restoration of De Fauveau's monument in Santa Maria del Carmine, restorers replaced Anne de la Pierre's chin, damaged during the Nazi invasion of Florence in 1943.

== Documentary ==
De Fauveau's life and works are featured in the original documentary in English and Italian A French Sculptress During the Grand Tour, produced by AWA and Art Media Studio. This bi-lingual documentary spotlights the artist's Florentine years and features the restoration of her Florentine masterworks Sepulcher for Louise de Favreau and Monument to Anne de la Pierre.
