= Violante Beatrice Siries =

Italian artist (1709–1783)

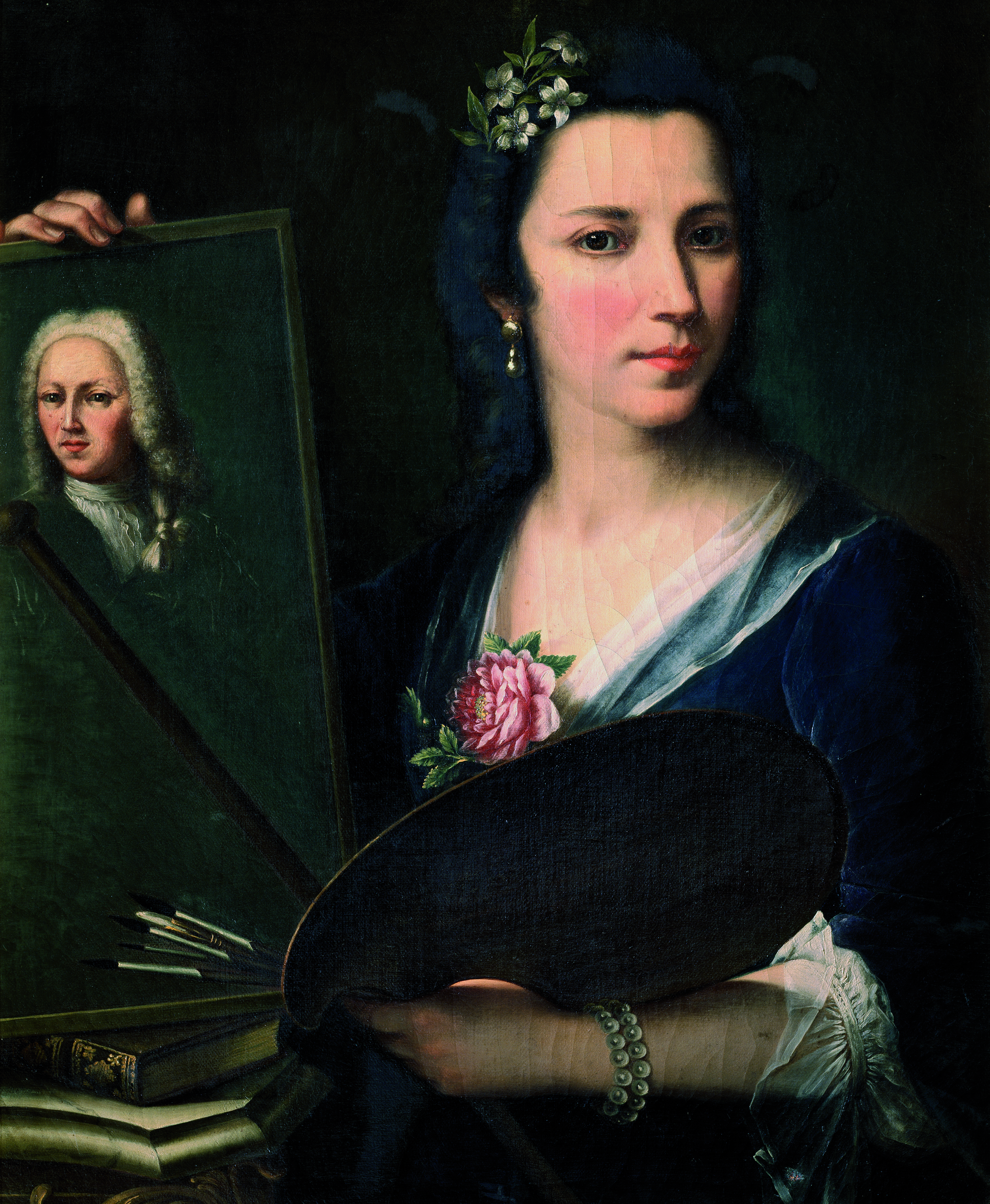
- Self-portrait of Siries
- Born: 26 January 1709; Florence, Grand Duchy of Tuscany
- Died: 20 April 1783 (aged 74); Florence, Grand Duchy of Tuscany
- Known for: Painting
- Spouse: Giuseppe Cerroti
- Patrons: Medici family

Violante Beatrice Siries (26 January 1709 – 20 April 1783) was an Italian painter. She was born in Florence and studied with Giovanna Fratellini and the sculptor Filippo della Valle. After moving to Paris in 1726 she studied under Hyacinthe Rigaud and François Boucher. Upon returning to Florence she married Giuseppe Cerroti, about whom nothing is known, and continued her artistic studies under Francesco Conti.

== Life and work ==
Violante was the daughter of Louis Siries, a French man who became the director of the Opificio delle pietre dure (workshop of precious stones).

Violante was talented in several genres, but established herself as a portraitist. She succeeded in gaining the patronage of the Medici family, notably including Gian Gastone de' Medici. After the death of Giovanna Fratellini in 1731, she also received support from the Medici's financial partners, the Gondi family. Violante returned to Florence in 1732 and was accepted into the Accademia delle Arti del Disegno. She often travelled to Rome and Vienna to execute commissions.

Her most ambitious work was a fourteen figure family group of the Emperor Charles VI, the father of Maria Theresa of Austria (1735). Three of her self-portraits are preserved in the Uffizi Gallery. Violante was the first female artist given permission by the Uffizi to copy the works of old masters.

Violante's depiction of Saint Francis of Assisi (1765) was in the ex-convent of Cappuccini of Montevarchi, and now can be found in Museo dei Cappuccini.

The Virgin Mary Presenting the Baby Jesus to Santa Maria Maddalena dei Pazzi (1767) was damaged in the 1966 flood of the Arno and later restored from 2015-2016 by Florence based American organization Advancing Women Artists Foundation. This work is a copy a work by Luca Giordano.

In later life she became a respected teacher. Her pupils included Anna Bacherini Piattoli and Maria Cosway.

She is one of the artists whose works are being restored by the Advancing Women Artists Foundation. She was also mentioned in Jane Fortune's book Invisible Women: Forgotten Artists of Florence, which discusses female Florentine artists.

Among her paintings :

- The Sleeping Seamstress (leaning on her sewing box).
- Saint Francis of Assisi
- Young Ladies in a Garden Landscape
- Captain Edward Hughes
- The Virgin Mary Presenting the Baby Jesus to Santa Maria Maddalena dei Pazzi.
- Double portrait of Peter Leopold of Habsburg and Maria Luisa of Spain

== Selected paintings ==
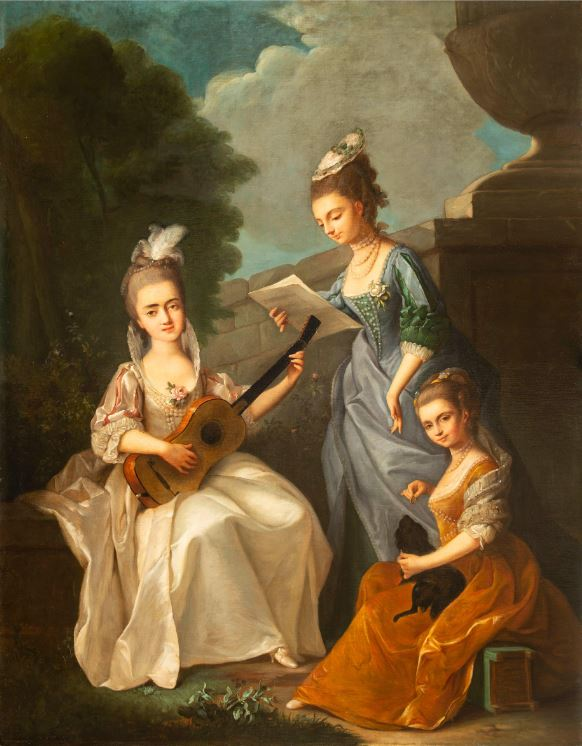
Young Ladies in a Garden Landscape (c.1735)

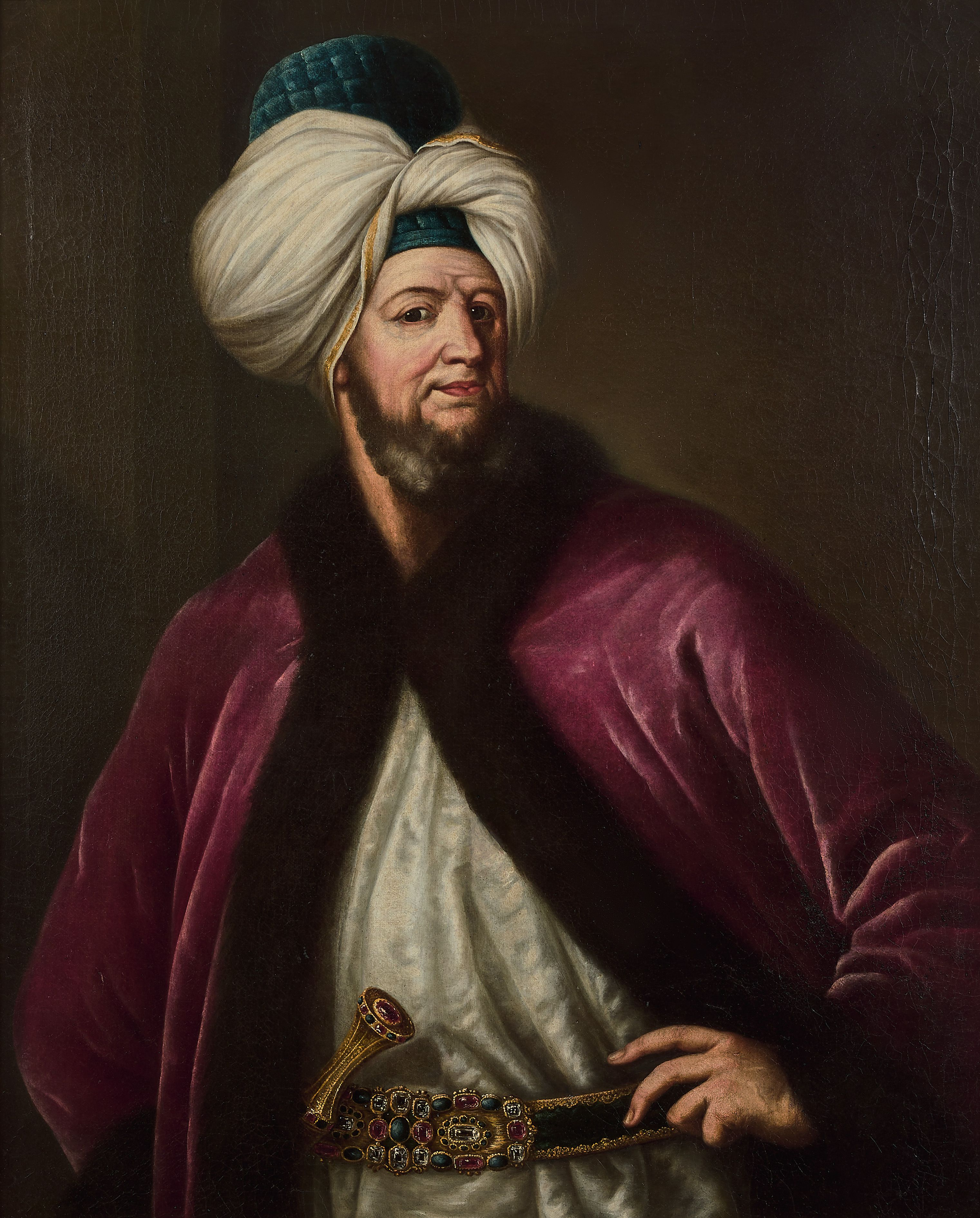
Count Claude Alexandre de Bonneval (1750)

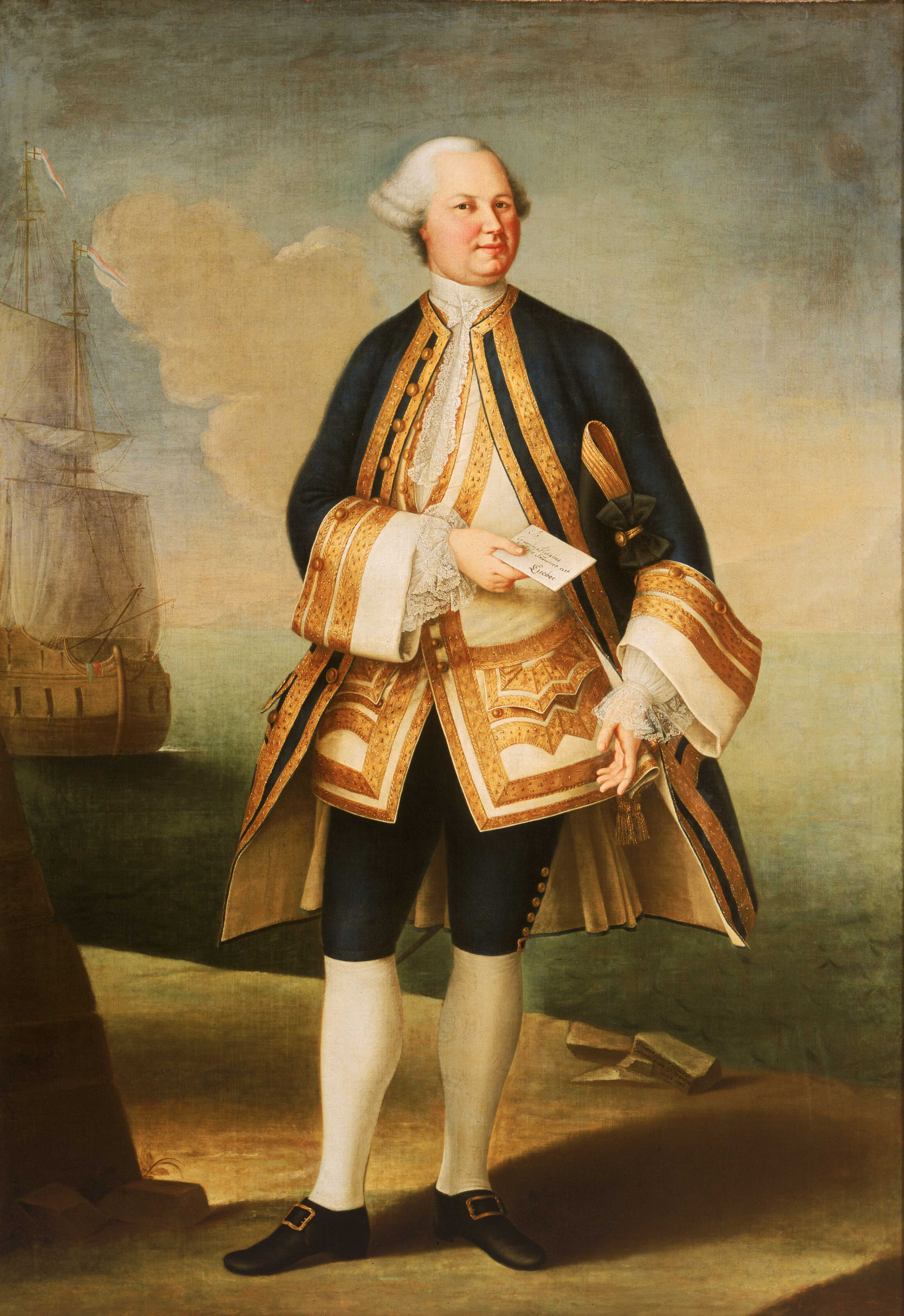
Captain Edward Hughes (1761)

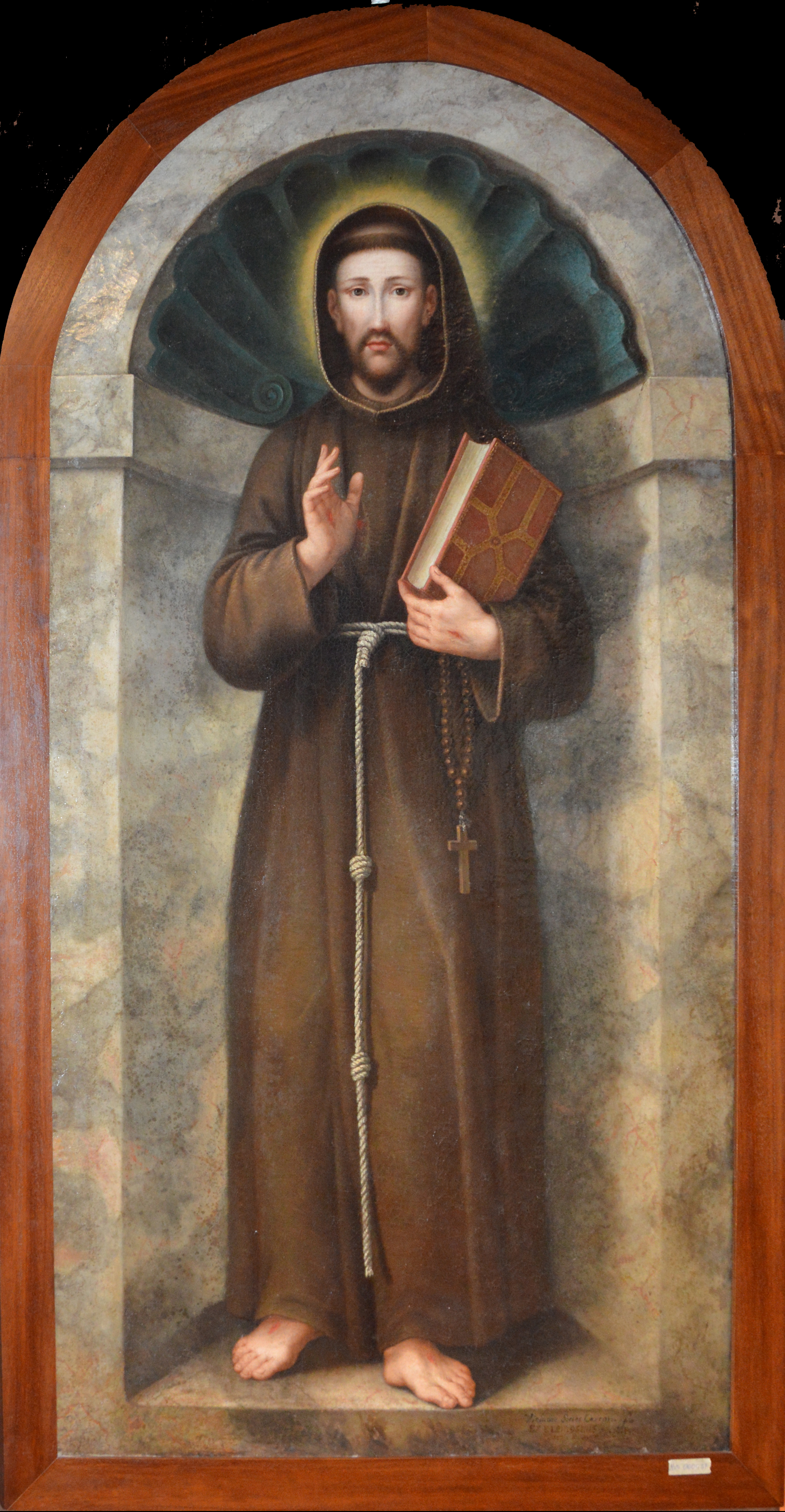
Saint Francis of Assisi (1765)

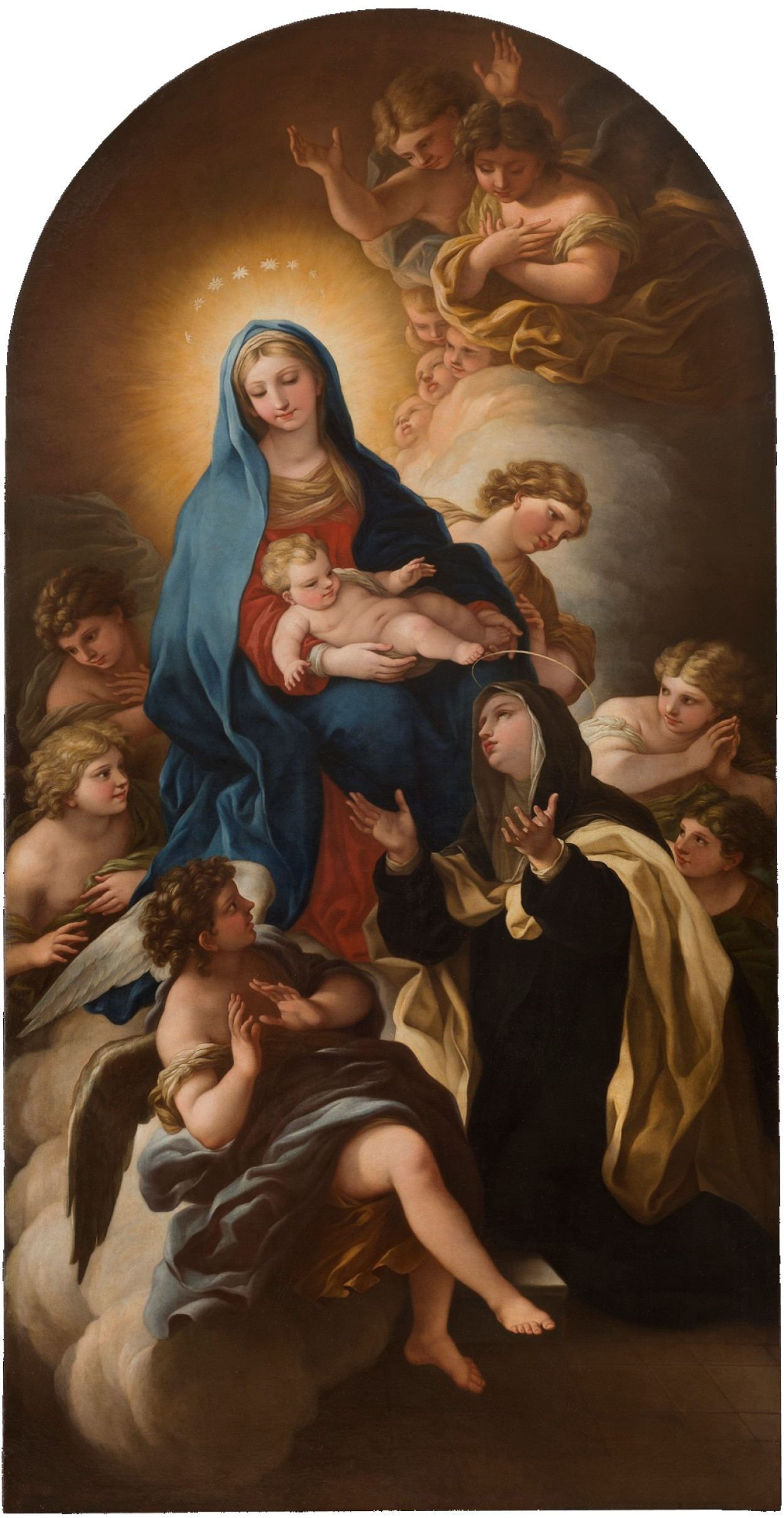
The Virgin Mary Presenting the Baby Jesus to Santa Maria Maddalena dei Pazzi (1767)

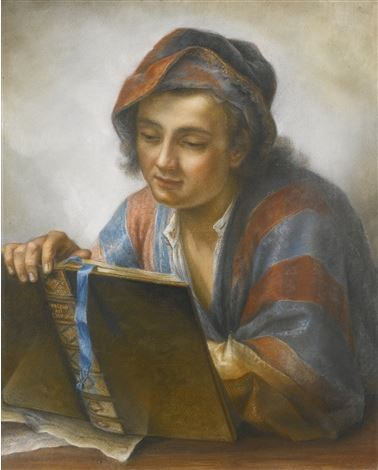
Young Man Reading the Notizia del Disegno (1775)
