= Medici Archive Project =

The Medici Archive Project (MAP) is a research institute whose mission is to disseminate, publish, and teach archival studies, paleography and the cultural legacy of the Medici Grand Dukes. It is based in Florence, Italy and is directed by Alessio Assonitis.

== History and development ==
Since its founding by Edward Goldberg, Sir Mark Fehrs Haukohl, Mary Jane Harris and Hester Diamond in 1995, the Medici Archive Project (MAP) has been innovating new strategies for research in the Humanities. During the early stages of its existence, MAP’s mission was to merge archival research with technological innovations for data management. A pioneering group of scholars began to catalog in a rudimentary electronic database the letters of one of the most exhaustive and complete courtly archives of early modern Europe: the Medici Grand Ducal Archival Collection (Mediceo del Principato). This archival collection ― comprising over four-million letters distributed in 6,429 volumes and occupying a mile of shelf space ― covers a chronological span of two hundred years, from 1537 to 1743. It documents the political, diplomatic, gastronomic, economic, artistic, scientific, military and medical culture of early modern Tuscany and Europe. In the decade following its founding, graduate students, university professors, museum curators, and independent researchers paid regular visits to MAP’s workspace at the State Archive in Florence in order to have access to unpublished documentary material or to seek help with archival research strategies related to their scholarly endeavors. At the same time, thanks to the NEH Fellowship Program and other similar fellowships, generations of MAP researchers, experienced in archival and paleographic studies, have worked continuously to populate this database with new material gleaned from the Medici manuscripts. Initially collected in an in-house database (Documentary Sources for the Arts and Humanities, 1537 to 1743) accessible only in situ, this vast repository of transcribed and contextualized documents was published online in April 2006, free of charge, for the benefit of the entire scholarly community.

During the past years, MAP’s trajectory has radically changed. Rather than serving as a provider of primary sources to restricted academic audiences, MAP set out to become a research institution with the mission of actively generating scholarly discourse and embracing disparate dimensions of scholarly experience. At the center of this operation has been MAP’s online platform, BIA, funded by the Andrew W. Mellon Foundation. Fully online since 2013, BIA provides access to an unparalleled range of digitized early modern material. As of 2015, this material comprises over 24,000 transcribed documentary records, 18,000 biographical entries, 87,000 geographical and topographical tags, and over 300,000 digitized images from 292 volumes of the Mediceo del Principato. Aside from providing a faster and more user-friendly interface for document entry, BIA has enabled scholars from all over the world, not only to view digitized images of archival documents, but also to enter transcriptions, provide scholarly feedback, and exchange comments in designated forums, all within BIA’s academic community of over 2400 international scholars, students, and enthusiasts who daily engage with one another, with the ever-increasing number of uploaded digitized documents, and with the staff and fellows of the Medici Archive Project.

In keeping with its evolving role as a research institute, MAP has committed itself to educating the scholars of the future. As such, MAP now administers a successful educational program, with seven semester-long online paleography courses taught since 2009. With over one hundred students having completed these online courses, MAP is now expanding and improving its course offering with new courses currently being prepared for MAP’s syllabus this Fall. These courses will make use of MAP’s new education module for paleography on BIA, recently developed with funding from the Andrew W. Mellon Foundation, which will allow students and teachers an even more interactive educational experience while working with freshly digitized archival material, much of which is unpublished. MAP’s mission to educate the scholars of the future in paleography and best archival practice has also been supported by an annual two-week long graduate seminar at the library of Santa Maria Novella in Florence devoted to the study of Florentine historical archives. Since the inauguration of the seminar in 2009, with generous financial support from the Samuel H. Kress Foundation, over fifty students have enrolled. From 2015, this seminar will also be taught in conjunction with the Archivio di Stato in Florence.

These efforts have culminated in MAP’s fellowship program for graduate students. Since 2011, thanks to the support of the Samuel H. Kress Foundation, MAP offers annually two short-term graduate fellowships in art history. In 2013 and 2014, these fellows were joined at MAP by graduate fellows generously supported by the Samuel Freeman Charitable Trust. Each fellow receives one-to-one support and supervision, along with office space and specialized archival training to help them pursue advanced research for his/her doctoral thesis.

MAP has also entered into other arenas of academic activity. In 2014, MAP launched a publication series with the academic publisher Brepols/Harvey Miller; seven titles have come out since 2016. Also notable is MAP’s participation at international conferences, such as the Sixteenth Century Society & Conference and the American Historical Association, as well as its active role within the Renaissance Society of America, at whose annual meetings MAP has sponsored over thirty panels since 2008. In the last three years, MAP has also started organizing international conferences in Florence, covering a range of subjects pertinent to the collections of the Medici Archive, such as women artists, public health, and the history of the Medici family. These events have hosted over sixty papers, often bridging the gap between American and European scholarship, and fostered new collaborations between MAP and research universities, other initiatives in the digital humanities, and individual scholars. The fruit of these efforts has been the recognition of MAP as one of the leading institutions in the broad field of early modern studies.

Lastly, five independent research programs have been created under MAP’s tutelage: the Jane Fortune Research Program on Women Artists in the Age of the Medici (with its own internship program for undergraduates): the Eugene Grant Research Program on Jewish History and Culture in Early Modern Europe; Medicine and the Medici in Grand Ducal Tuscany Research Program; The Birth of News. A Program in Early Modern Media Studies; and most recently, France and the Medici (1533-1642). A Research Program in Early Modern French History. These research programs have enriched both MAP and the BIA platform: they have opened up new horizons for research and investment, and strengthened MAP’s ambition to digitize, preserve, and disseminate evermore of the world’s collections of early modern archival material.

== Relations with the US, Italy and the world ==
Governed by an American Board of Trustees, the Medici Archive Project is a non-profit cultural foundation 501(c) (3) in the United States that has operated out of the Florentine State Archive since the early 1990s. Beginning in the MAP’s earliest years, the National Endowment for the Humanities has provided generous and crucial financial resources as well as guiding directives. Over the course of these past twenty years, dozens of post-doctoral fellows from the US, Ireland, UK, Germany, Spain, Australia, and Italy have been sponsored by the NEH and numerous other American Foundations, including the Gladys Krieble Delmas Foundation, the DeRoy Testamentary Foundation, the J. Paul Getty Foundation, the Florence Gould Foundation, the Eugene and Emily Grant Family Foundation, the International Music and Art Foundation, the Samuel H. Kress Foundation, and the Andrew W. Mellon Foundation. In addition, many private American citizens have made substantial personal donations.

The MAP’s work and success would not be possible without the essential cooperation and support from public and private Italian entities. In 2001, MAP concluded a formal agreement with the State Archive in Florence, ratified by the National Directorship of Archives and the Ministry of Culture, to create an official collaboration and to allow MAP exclusive use of a large workroom within the Archivio di Stato. Here MAP researchers work closely with the community of international scholars who study in the Archive, as well as in cooperation with the Staff of the Archivio itself. In return, MAP makes an annual contribution to the State Archive in Florence to digitize documents for preservation purposes. This is the first agreement of its kind between an Italian national entity and a private foundation. In 2010, a landmark agreement was struck between MAP and the Italian Ministry of Culture allowing MAP to digitize documents at the Archivio di Stato for the population of its BIA database; the ownership of the digitized images remains with the Archivio di Stato. Important financial underwriting for the work of the post-doctoral fellows has come from Italian entities such as the Compagnia di San Paolo and the Fondazione Monte dei Paschi di Siena.
