= The Last Supper (Plautilla Nelli) =

Painting by Plautilla Nelli

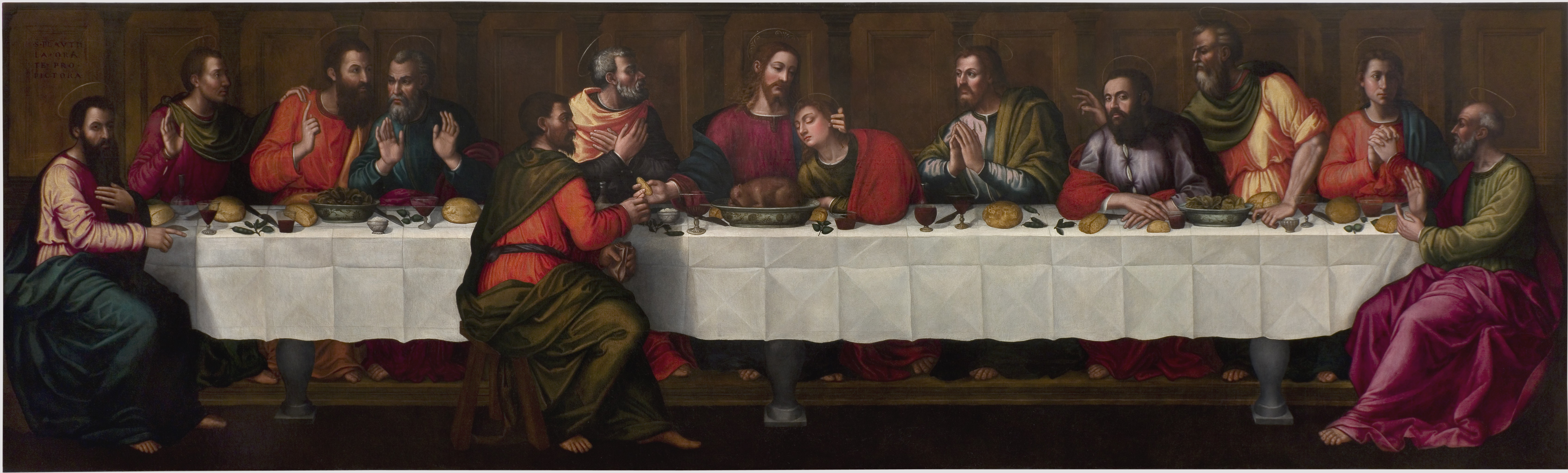
- Artist: Plautilla Nelli
- Year: 1550s
- Medium: Oil on canvas
- Location: Basilica of Santa Maria Novella, Florence

The Last Supper is a large (6.5' × 25') oil painting on canvas by the Italian Renaissance artist Plautilla Nelli, one of only four women artists mentioned in Giorgio Vasari's Lives of the Artists. Nelli was a nun at the Dominican monastery of Santa Caterina in Florence and painted The Last Supper for its refectory. The painting was largely ignored until the 1990s; it was restored in the 2010s.
