= San Felice a Ema =

Church in Florence, Italy

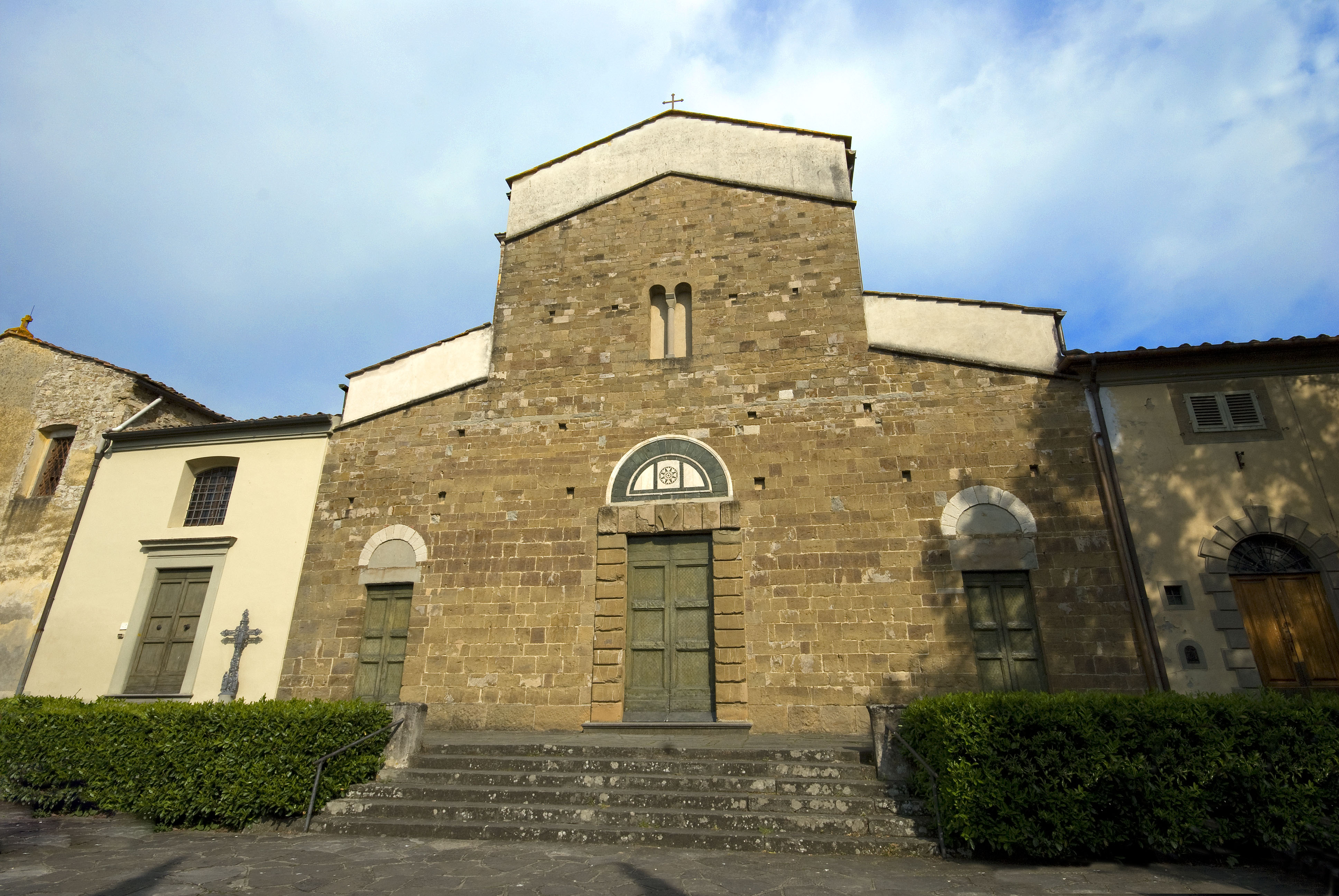
- Façade of the church.

Religion
- Affiliation: Roman Catholic
- Province: Florence

Location
- Location: Florence, Italy
- Interactive map of San Felice a Ema
- Coordinates: 43°44′24″N 11°14′24″E

Architecture
- Type: Church

San Felice a Ema is a Roman Catholic church located on the Via of the same name in the neighborhood of Galluzzo, southeast of the urban center of Florence, Italy.

== History ==
The first documentation of the church, dedicated to Felix of Nola, is from the 1066. when it was donated by Gisla, the widow of Azzo to the monastery of San Pier Maggiore in the city. It became a collegiate church in the 1200s, gained a baptistry in 1500, and became a provost church in 1748. The church was deconsecrated on two occasions, 1791 and 1936.

The stone-brick facade has three round arched portals. The central portal has the heraldic arms (1532) of the parish priest Pietro Della Luna, nominated to this church by Pope Leo X. Above this portal is a narrow mullioned windows. The interior had an extensive refurbishment with stucco decoration in 1791, but a restoration in 1966 removed some of this neoclassical decor, bringing to light the original Romanesque columns. The altarpieces are works from the 17th and 18th century, while the canon's office displays the central panel of a polyptych depicting Madonna and Child with Compagni Family (1387) by Giovanni del Biondo. The cemetery behind the church has the tomb of Eugenio Montale.

To the left of the portal is the Oratory of the Company of the Santissima Annunziata (Holiest Virgin of the Annunciation) which has had its frescoes and altarpiece depicting the Annunciation. In the 1980s, the roof collapsed and it is presently undergoing restoration. The company was founded in 1489.
