= Serafino Razzi =

Italian composer

Serafino Razzi (1531–1613), born in Marradi and later residing in Florence, was a notable Italian Dominican friar celebrated for his contributions to music and literature.

In 1563, he unveiled a substantial compilation of carnival songs within the lauda genre, titled Libro primo delle laudi spirituale. This collection stands as a vibrant mosaic, showcasing pieces of diverse ages and characters drawn from the rich musical landscape of Florence. Comprising 91 lauda settings for one to four voices, Razzi's work reflects his extensive travels, meticulously chronicled in his diaries.

Razzi's sister was the sculptor and nun Maria Angelica Razzi.

== Works (books) ==
- Vite dei santi, e beati cosi uomini, come donne del sacro ordine (in Italian). Florence: Bartolomeo Sermartelli. 1577.
- La vita et institutioni del Giovan. Taulero [Life and Institutions of Johannes Tauler] (in Italian). Florence: per Filippo Giunti. 1590.
- La storia di Raugia (in Italian). Lucca: per il Busdrago. 1595.
- Istoria de gli huomini: cosi nelle prelature, come nelle dottrine del sacro ordine de gli predicatori (in Italian). Lucca: per il Busdrago. 1596.
- Giardino d'essempi, ouero Fiori delle vite de' Santi (in Italian). Venice: presso Daniel Zanetti. 1599.

== Works (music) ==
- Libro primo delle laudi spirituali (1563), a large collection of carnival songs in the lauda genre. This collection includes 91 lauda settings for one to four voices.
- O dolcezza (date of publication unknown)
- O Giesu dolce (date of publication unknown)
- O Maria diana stella (date of publication unknown)
- O Vergin Santa non m'abbandonare (date of publication unknown)
- Stabat mater dolorosa (date of publication unknown)
- Razzi's music was likely much more extensive than what survives today. His collection "Libro primo" suggests there may have been additional planned volumes that were never published.
