= Jane Fortune =

American author, journalist and philanthropist

- Born: August 7, 1942; Indianapolis, Indiana, USA
- Died: September 23, 2018 (aged 76); Indianapolis, Indiana, U.S.A.
- Occupations: Author, journalist

Jane Fortune (August 7, 1942 – September 23, 2018) was an American author and journalist. Many of her publications and philanthropic activities were centered on the research, restoration, and exhibition of art by women in Florence, Italy.

== Writing ==
Fortune was the cultural editor of The Florentine, an English-language newspaper in Tuscany, in which she appeared as a regular art and culture columnist from the newspaper's founding in 2005 until her death in 2018. Her original column, Mosaics (2005–2008), led to her writing a guidebook on the culture of Florence, To Florence, Con Amore: 77 Ways to Love the City (The Florentine Press, 2007). The book's second edition, reprinted three years later with 13 additional chapters, is entitled To Florence, Con Amore: 90 Ways to Love the City (The Florentine Press, 2011).

Fortune's subsequent books, documentaries, and essays were influenced largely by her efforts to safeguard and promote art by women artists. Her book, Invisible Women: Forgotten Artists of Florence (2009), documents women painters in Florence and their thousands of works on display or in storage, many of which are in need of restoration. In 2009, the book was presented to the Uffizi Library. This volume was followed up in 2012 by a guidebook she co-authored with Linda Falcone, which describes where to view artworks by women artists in the public collections of Florence: Art by Women in Florence: A Guide through Five Hundred Years (The Florentine Press, 2012).

== Restoring art by women in Florence ==
In 2005, with the goal of raising awareness about the achievements of women artists and protecting their artworks, Fortune founded the Italian nonprofit organization, The Florence Committee of the National Museum for Women in the Arts. In 2006, under Fortune's leadership, The Florence Committee funded the restoration a painting in the San Marco Museum, Lamentation with Saints, a large-scale Renaissance painting by Suor Plautilla Nelli, Florence's earliest recognized woman painter to that date. In 2008, her quest continued with the restoration of David and Bathsheba by seventeenth-century Baroque painter Artemisia Gentileschi. Following up on these achievements, but wishing to work on a broader scope, in 2009, Fortune founded the American 501(c)(3) nonprofit organization, Advancing Women Artists Foundation (AWA), dedicated to researching, restoring, and exhibiting art work by women artists, particularly in Florence, Italy.

== Other projects in Florence ==
Since Fortune founded the Advancing Women Artists Foundation (AWA) in 2009, it has carried out several restoration projects for drawings, paintings, and sculptures by women artists in Florence from the sixteenth to the nineteenth centuries including Dominican convent painter Suor Plautilla Nelli at the San Salvi's Last Supper Museum, eighteenth-century Florentine poet-painter Irene Parenti Duclos at the Accademia Gallery and nineteenth-century French sculptor Félicie de Fauveau in Santa Croce, and Santa Maria del Carmine. The foundation also sponsors exhibitions, conference, seminars, books, and documentaries to promote the achievements of historic women artists, in addition to safeguarding their work. The foundation sponsors an honors program, 'The Nelli Awards', dedicated to recognizing modern-day women working in Florence, including women curators, artists, and restorers.

In 2010, Fortune established the Jane Fortune Research Program at the Medici Archive Project in Florence, for finding new archival documents regarding the history of women artists, assisting study of this material by scholars, and mentoring young scholars in the field.

== Projects in the United States ==
In 2008, with co-founder Robert Hesse, Fortune established the Indianapolis City Ballet (ICB), a nonprofit organization that supports ballet performances with international dancers from ballet companies from several countries and master classes with these dancers in Indianapolis.

Fortune was a member of the board of the National Museum of Women in the Arts, Washington, D.C.; the Sidney and Lois Eskenazi Museum of Art at Indiana University; the Herron School of Art and Design; the Pennsylvania Academy of the Fine Arts, and of the National Museum of Women in the Arts in Washington, D.C. Fortune was a member of the board of directors of the Pennsylvania Academy of the Fine Arts in Philadelphia, Pennsylvania, and was chair of the board of trustees of the Studio Arts Center International (SACI) in Florence. She was an honorary member of the dean's advisory board at Herron School of Art and Design in Indianapolis, Indiana, and was on the board of trustees of the Medici Archive Project (Florence, Italy and New York). In Philadelphia, Fortune co-founded USArtists, an American Fine Art Show and Sale, which benefited the Pennsylvania Academy of the Fine Arts. She was the founder of the same organization's Special Needs Program that resulted in the establishment of the Women's Board Endowed Scholarship at Pennsylvania Academy of the Fine Arts, a scholarship for persons with disabilities to attend the PAFA art school. She endowed the Jane Fortune Outstanding Women Visiting Artist Lecture at Herron School of Art and Design. Past lecturers have been Eleanor Antin, Maria Magdalena Compos-Pons, Judy Chicago, Judith Shea, Audrey Flack, Betty Woodman, and Polly Apfelbaum. She was chair of the board of the Deafness Research Foundation in New York City and its volunteer president-CEO.

== Recognitions and awards ==
In 2010, Fortune was awarded an honorary doctorate in Humane Letters from Indiana University for her work as an author and philanthropist in the United States and Italy. In 2007, the Indianapolis Mayor's Advisory Council on Disabilities awarded Fortune their Accessibility Award for her work on accessibility and inclusion for persons with disabilities. Maxwell L. Anderson—the Melvin & Bren Simon Director and CEO of the Indianapolis Museum of Art— nominated her for the Accessibility Award, for her leadership and financial support of the museum's accessibility program. In 2008, Dr. Fortune also received the ‘Spirit of Philanthropy Award’ from Indiana University Purdue University Indianapolis (IUPUI), the Herron School of Art and Design in Indianapolis. In 2013, the documentary, Invisible Women: Forgotten Artists of Florence, based on her 2009 book by the same title, was awarded a regional Emmy Award as Best Documentary in the Historical/Cultural Program Category. In 2013, for her work in Florence she received the Tuscan-American Association Award. This award, presented annually at Florence's Palazzo Vecchio, honors an American and an Italian for their contributions to the culture of Florence. Past awardees include Andrea Bocelli, Zubin Mehta, and Franco Zeffirelli.

== Death ==
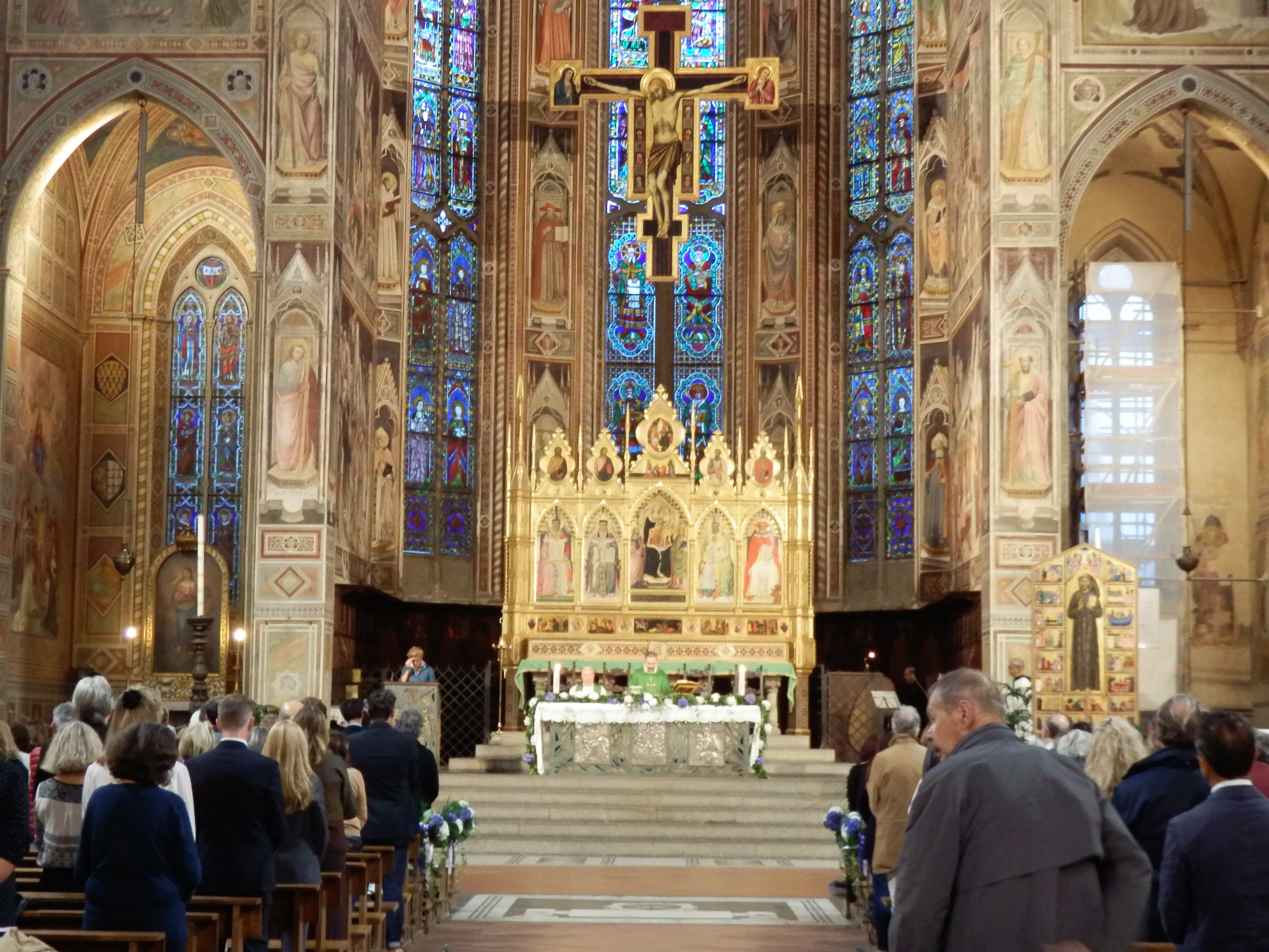
Memorial Mass in Santa Croce for Jane Fortune

Fortune died at her home in Indianapolis on September 23, 2018, at the age of 76. A memorial ceremony was held for her at the Basilica of Santa Croce in Florence on October 9, 2018. She is survived by her son, John Medveckis, her daughter, Jennifer Medveckis, and her son-in-law, James Marzo.

== Bibliography ==
- The Restoration of Lamentation with Saints. Jane Fortune, Rossella Lari, and Magnolia Scudieri. 2006. Arte Media Studio, Florence, Italy (Documentary – DVD).
- To Florence, Con Amore: 77 Ways to Love the City. Jane Fortune. 2007. Florence: The Florentine Press.
- David and Bathsheba, The Restoration by Linda Falcone, Jane Fortune and Serena Padovani. 2008. Art Media Studio, Florence, Italy (Documentary – DVD).
- Invisible Women: Forgotten Artists of Florence. Jane Fortune. 2009. Florence, Italy: The Florentine Press.
- Continuing the Commitment: A Tribute to Suor Plautilla Nelli by Jane Fortune in Orate Pro Pictora: Pray for the Paintress. 2009. The Florentine Press, Florence, Italy.
- To Florence, Con Amore: 90 Ways to Love the City. Jane Fortune. 2010. Florence, Italy: The Florentine Press.
- Rediscovering Florence's Native-born Female Artists in Irene Parenti Duclos: A Work Restored—An Artist Revealed. Linda Falcone, ed. 2011. Florence: The Florentine Press.
- Art by Women in Florence: A Guide through Five Hundred Years. Jane Fortune and Linda Falcone, 2012. Florence: The Florentine Press.
- Félicie de Fauveau: Artistic Passion and Political Exile. Jane Fortune. 2013. In Santa Croce in Pink: Untold Stories of Women and their Monuments, Linda Falcone (Ed.) Florence: Artecelata, pgs. 55–58.
