= Luisa Silei =

Italian painter

- Born: 17 February 1825; Florence, Grand Duchy of Tuscany
- Died: 5 February 1898 (aged 72); Rome, Italy
- Known for: Painting

Luisa Silei (17 February 1825 – 5 February 1898) was an Italian painter who mainly painted landscapes.

== Life ==
Luisa was born and resided in Florence. She studied with Carlo Marko. She exhibited in 1883, in Roma: Dawn is Near and A trip in Autumn. At the 1884 Turin Exhibition of Fine Arts, she exhibits: Il sorger della Luna. In this same time, at the Exposition of the Society of the Encouragement of Fine Arts of Florence: Flowers which in 1885, was re-exhibited at the same Exposition. She also participated in the 1882 Florentine Exhibition of Fine Arts. One of her master works is Reminiscenze del Lago d' Orbetello.

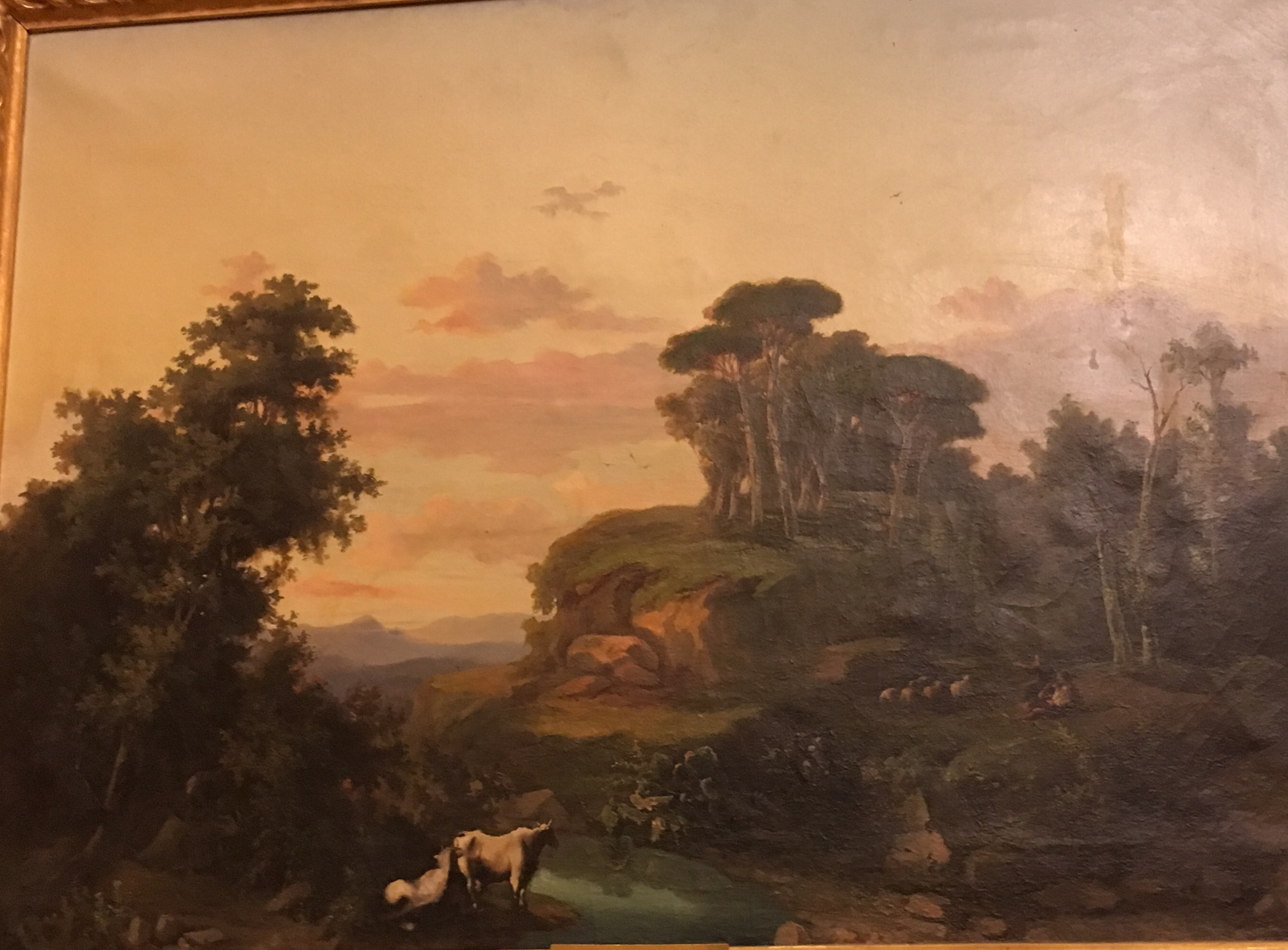
Luisa Silei landscape
