= Ippolito Galantini (painter) =

Italian painter

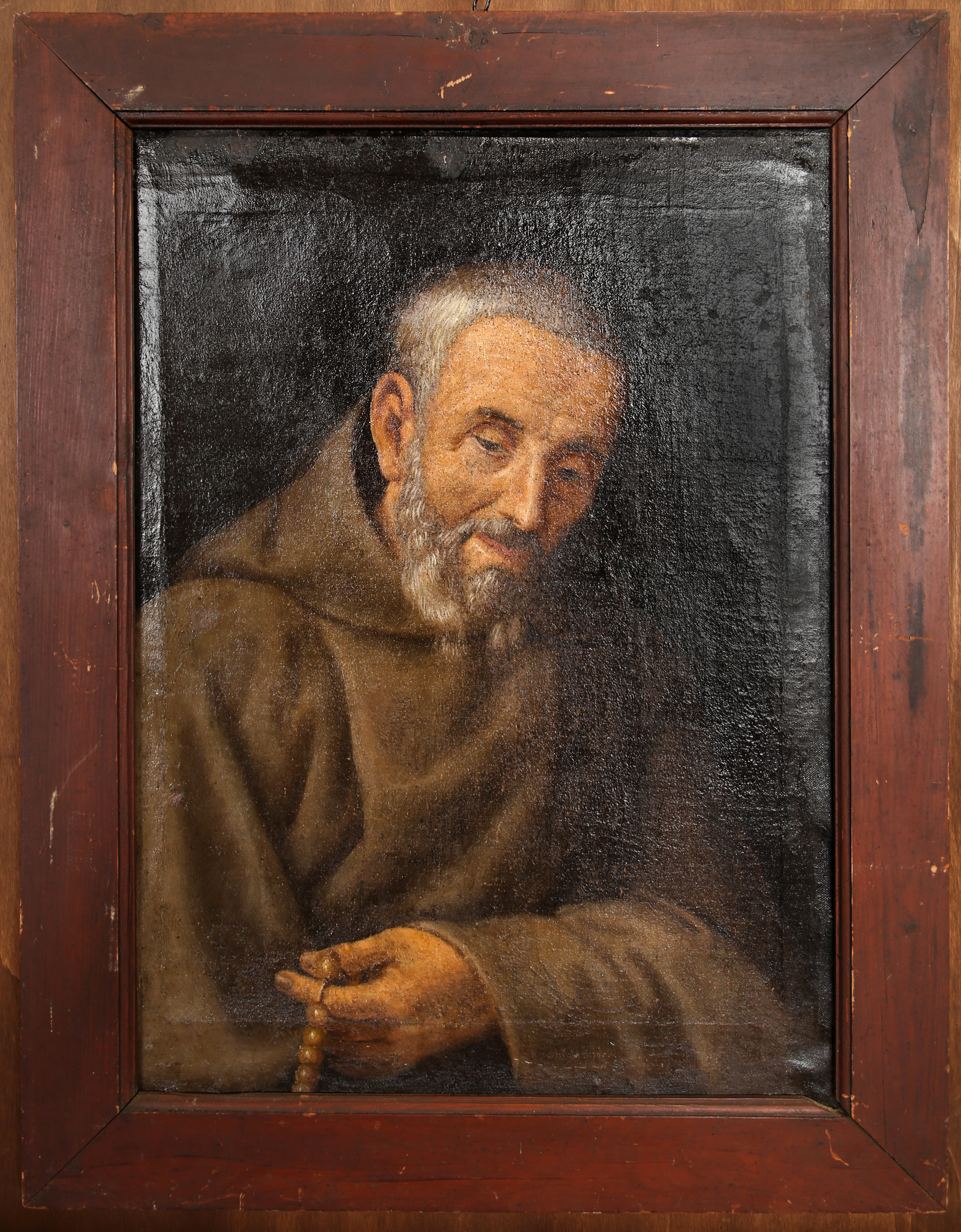
Beato Ranieri da Sansepolcro, 1650-1700 ca.

Ippolito Galantini (1627–1706) called II Cappucino, and sometimes II Prete Genovese, was an Italian painter of the Baroque period. Born at Florence in 1627, he was for some time a scholar of Padre Stefaneschi, through whose influence he became a monk of the order of the Capuchins, whence the two names by which he is frequently known. He was sent as a missionary to India, where he passed several years, and on his return to Europe painted several pictures for the churches of his order. The Uffizi Gallery in Florence contains his own portrait. He died in 1706, in the monastery of Montughi, near Florence. Among his pupils was Giovanna Fratellini.
