= Plautilla Nelli =

Italian artist (1524–1588)

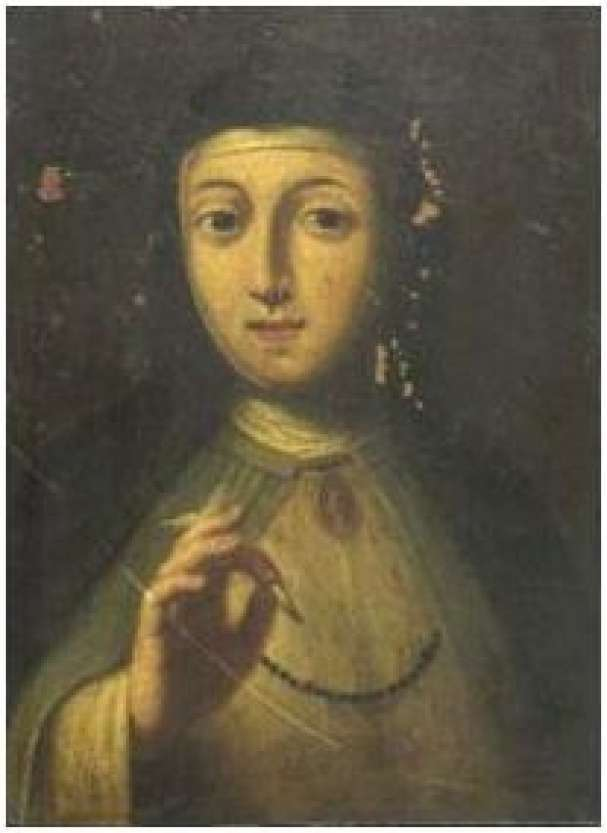
- Born: 1524; Florence, Republic of Florence
- Died: 1588 (aged 63–64); Florence, Grand Duchy of Tuscany

Sister Plautilla Nelli (1524–1588) was a self-taught nun-artist and the first ever known female Renaissance painter of Florence. She was a nun of the Dominican convent of St. Catherine of Siena located in Piazza San Marco, Florence, and was heavily influenced by the teachings of Savonarola and by the artwork of Fra Bartolomeo.

== Life ==
Pulisena Margherita Nelli was born into a wealthy family in the San Felice area of Florence. Her father, Piero di Luca Nelli, was a successful fabric merchant and her ancestors originated from the Tuscan valley area of Mugello, as did the Medici dynasty. There is a modern-day street in Florence, Via del Canto de' Nelli, in the San Lorenzo district, named for her family, and the New Sacristy of the Church of San Lorenzo is the original site of her family homes.

She became a nun at the age of fourteen, taking on the name Suor Plautilla, at the convent of Santa Caterina di Cafaggio; she would later be prioress on three occasions. The facility was managed by the Dominican friars of San Marco, led by Savonarola. About half of all educated girls in that era were placed into convents to avoid the cost of raising a dowry. Savonarola's preachings promoted devotional painting and drawing by religious women to avoid sloth, thus the convent became a center for nun-artists. Her sister, also a nun, Costanza, (Suor Petronilla) wrote a life of Savonarola.

Nelli had the favor of many patrons (including women), executing large pieces and miniatures. Sixteenth-century art historian Giorgio Vasari wrote, "and in the houses of gentlemen throughout Florence, there are so many pictures, that it would be tedious to attempt to speak of them all." Fra' Serafino Razzi, a sixteenth-century Dominican Friar, historian and Savonaroliano (disciple of Savonarola), named three nuns of Santa Caterina as disciples of Plautilla, Suor Prudenza Cambi, Suor Agata Trabalesi, Suor Maria Ruggieri, and three others as additional producers: Suor Veronica, Suor Dionisia Niccolini, and his sister Suor Maria Angelica Razzi.

== Art and style ==
Though she was self-taught, she copied works of the mannerist painter Agnolo Bronzino and high Renaissance painter Andrea del Sarto. Her primary source of inspiration came from copying works of Fra Bartolomeo, which mirrored the classicism-style enforced by Savonarola's artistic theories. Fra Bartolomeo left his drawings to his pupil, Fra Paolino who, in turn left them in the possession of "a nun who paints" in the convent of Santa Caterina da Siena. Nelli signed her paintings as "Pray for the Paintress" after her name, confirming her role in spite of her gender.

Her work is distinguished from that of her influencers by the heightened sentiment she added to each of her characters' expressions. Author Jane Fortune referred to her Lamentation with Saints and the "raw emotional grief surrounding Christ's death as depicted through the red eyes and visible tears of its female figures" as a case in point. Nelli's Lamentation, which is now in the Museum of San Marco, Florence, is also discussed in The Painter-Prioress of Renaissance Florence, by Jonathan K. Nelson.

Most of Nelli's works are large-scale, which was most uncommon for a woman to paint, in her era.

She is one of the few female artists mentioned in Vasari's Lives of the Most Excellent Painters, Sculptors, and Architects. Her work is characterized by religious themes, with vivid portrayals of emotion on her characters' faces. Nelli lacked any formal training and her male figures are said to have “feminine characteristics”, as her religious vocation prohibited study of the nude male.

== Works created, rediscovered, and restored ==
Nelli produced mainly devotional pieces including large-scale paintings, wood lunettes, book illustrations, and drawings. Her paintings include Lamentation with Saints (in the large refectory, San Marco Museum, restored 2006), Saint Catherine Receiving the Stigmata and Saint Dominic Receiving the Rosary, in the Andrea del Sarto Last Supper Museum of San Salvi, both restored in 2008. Nelli's Grieving Madonna, also at San Salvi, is a copy of the same subject by Alessandro Allori. Her Crucifixion is exhibited in the Certosa di Galluzzo Monastery, near Florence. The Last Supper, in the refectory of Santa Maria Novella, is the only work Nelli signed. Her nine drawings in the Uffizi's Department of Prints and Drawings were restored in 2007 and include several representations of the human figure such as Bust of a Young Woman, Head of a Youth and Kneeling Male Figure. The Pentecost in Perugia's Basilica of San Domenico is another of her most significant works, as are her Annunciation and Saint Catherine of Siena, both in the Uffizi.

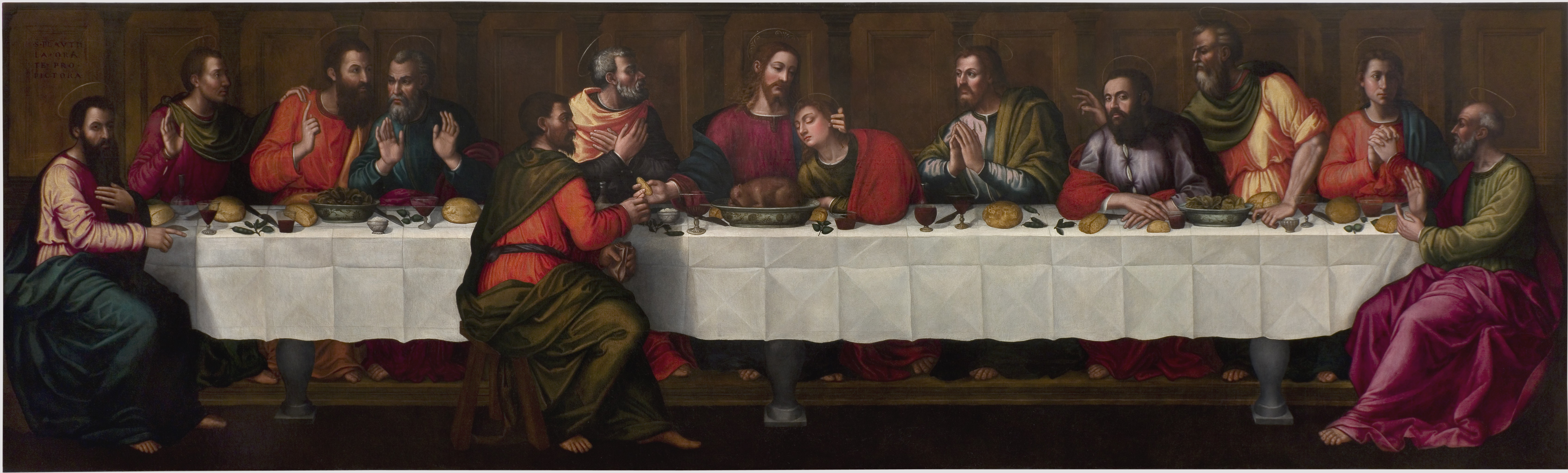
The Last Supper, a 7x2-meter oil painting on canvas in the Basilica of Santa Maria Novella, is the only signed work by Plautilla Nelli known to survive.

Painted in the 1560s, Nelli's Last Supper is the earliest known depiction of the subject by a woman. Florence has the richest tradition of paintings of the Last Supper in the world. Her most significant work because of its size and subject, it is a seven meter–long oil painting on canvas. The Last Supper was under restoration for four years. The work then went on exhibit in October 2019 at the Santa Maria Novella Museum in Florence, across from Alessandro Allori's painting of the subject, also painted in the sixteenth century.

Nelli's work represents a daring creative endeavor for a nun-artist of her period, as most were relegated to producing miniatures, textiles, or small sculptures in painted terra cotta or wood. By creating and signing this enormous fresco-like work depicting one of Florence's most beloved spiritual subjects, Nelli successfully placed herself among the ranks of her male counterparts, such as Leonardo da Vinci, Andrea del Sarto and Domenico Ghirlandaio, an accomplishment lost to history for many centuries. Due to the recent restoration of the Lamentation, there has been more investigation into Nelli's life and art.

== Documentary ==
The Restoration of Lamentation with Saints: Plautilla Nelli is a thirty-six-minute documentary on the life of Nelli and on the process of restoring of one of her most significant large-scale paintings. The documentary, produced in 2007 by Art Media Studio, Florence, was developed and funded by The Advancing Women Artists Foundation's founder Jane Fortune and The Florence Committee of the National Museum of Women in the Arts.

The documentary explores the preparatory drawings beneath the painting's pictorial surface using the process of reflectography. It shows various steps of the restoration project safeguarding the painting against woodworms, found in the painting's wood panel and exterminated, and centuries of encrusted dust and dirt. The documentary's main protagonists include museum executives and art conservation experts such as the San Marco Museum director Dr. Magnolia Scudieri and Florentine restorer Rossella Lari. The restored painting was completed in October 2006, and unveiled at Florence's San Marco Museum where it is exhibited in the large refectory. In her closing comment, Scudieri states, "Not only can we more clearly see the painting's expressive intensity thanks to this restoration, we can also more fully understand the convent life of Plautilla Nelli and her time in Florence.

== PBS television documentary ==
The Emmy-winning PBS television documentary (June, 2013) Invisible Women, Forgotten Artists of Florence, based on Dr. Jane Fortune's book by the same title, features a segment on Suor Plautilla Nelli and the restoration of the Lamentation with Saints. The television special, which spotlights the thousands of works by women in storage in Florence's museums, hails the little-known nun-painter as "the first woman artist of Florence."

== Paintings ==
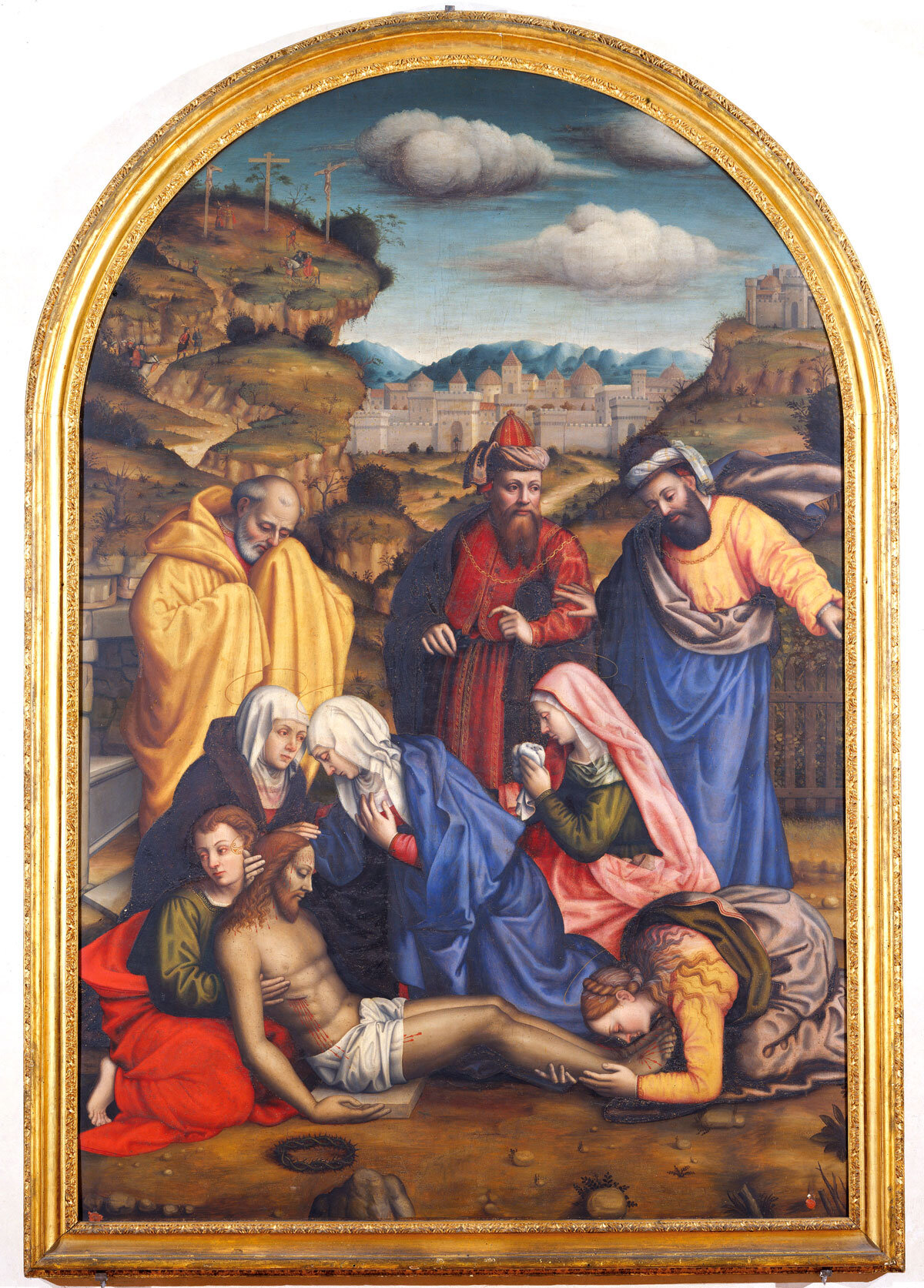
Lamentation with Saints

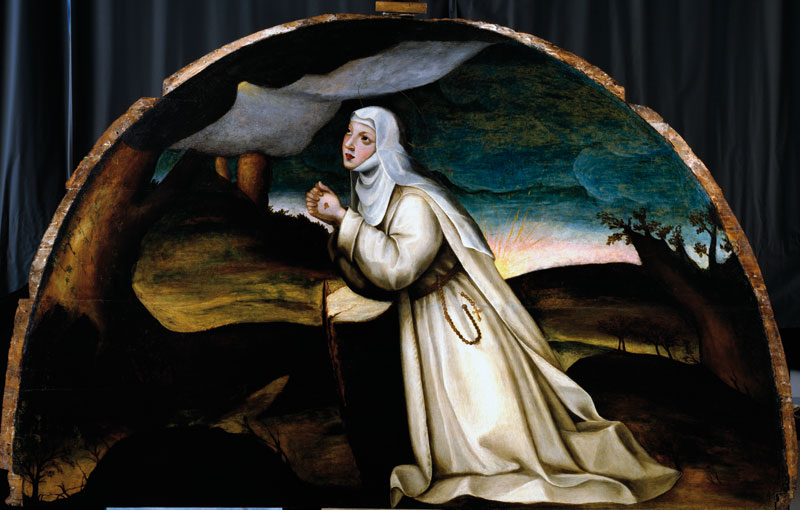
Saint Catherine Receives the Stigmata

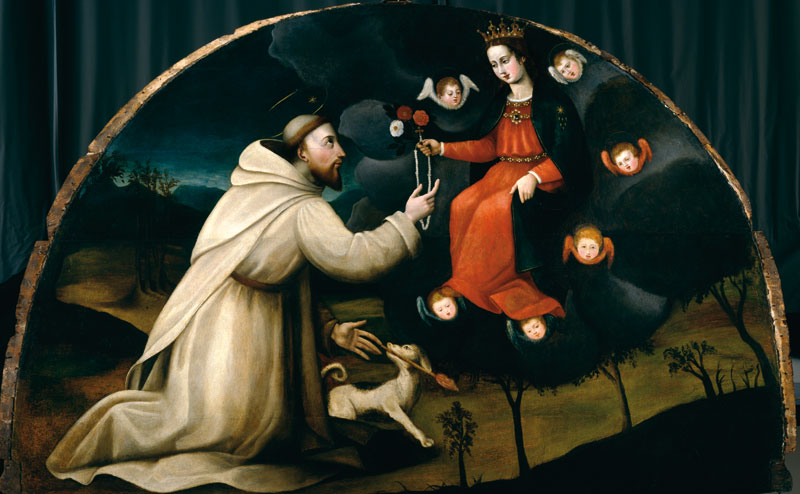
Saint Dominic Receives the Rosary

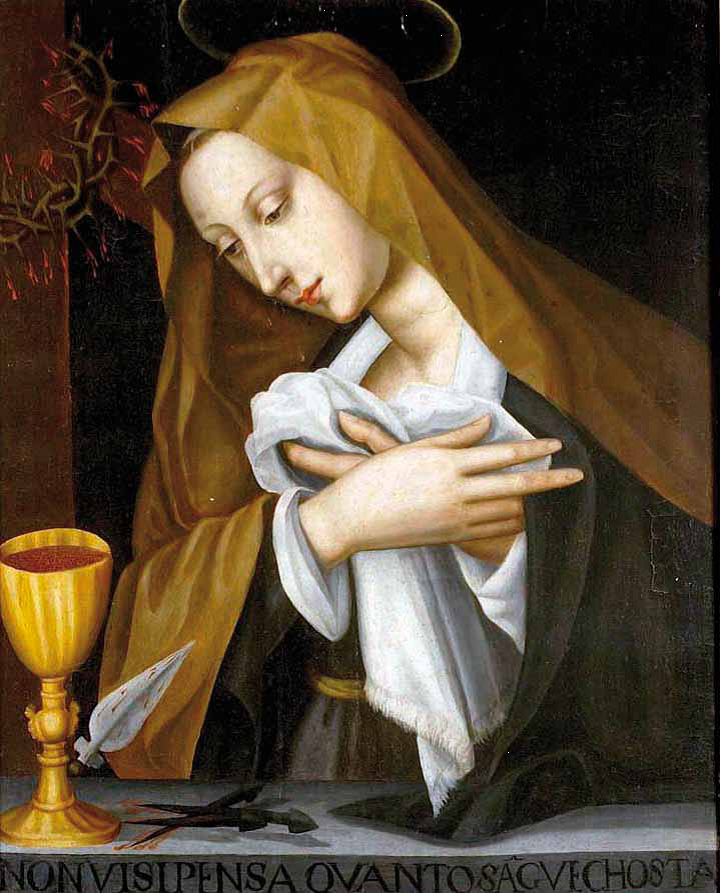
Mater Dolorosa

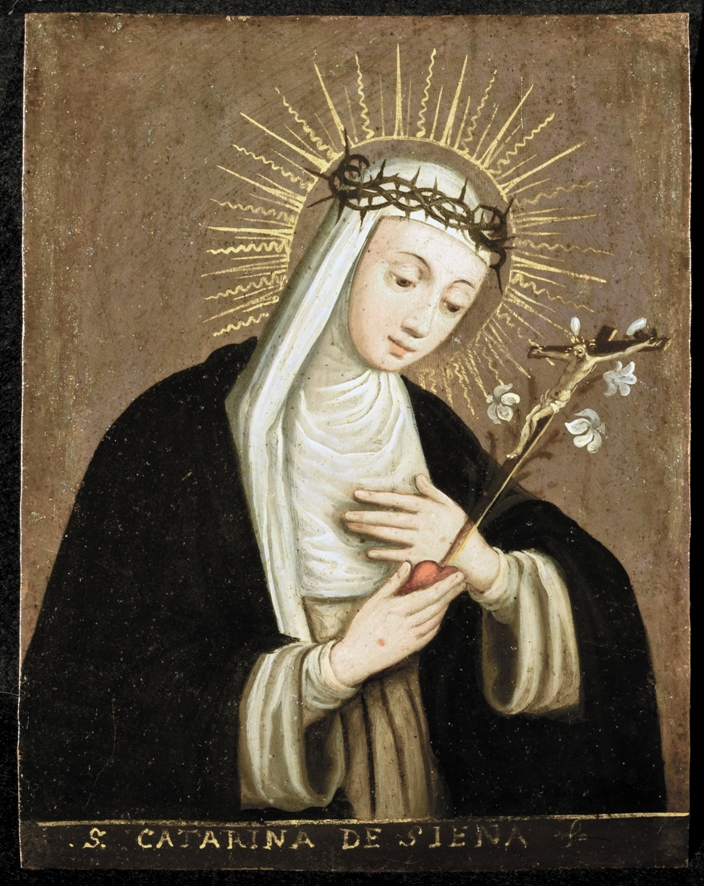
St. Catherine of Siena

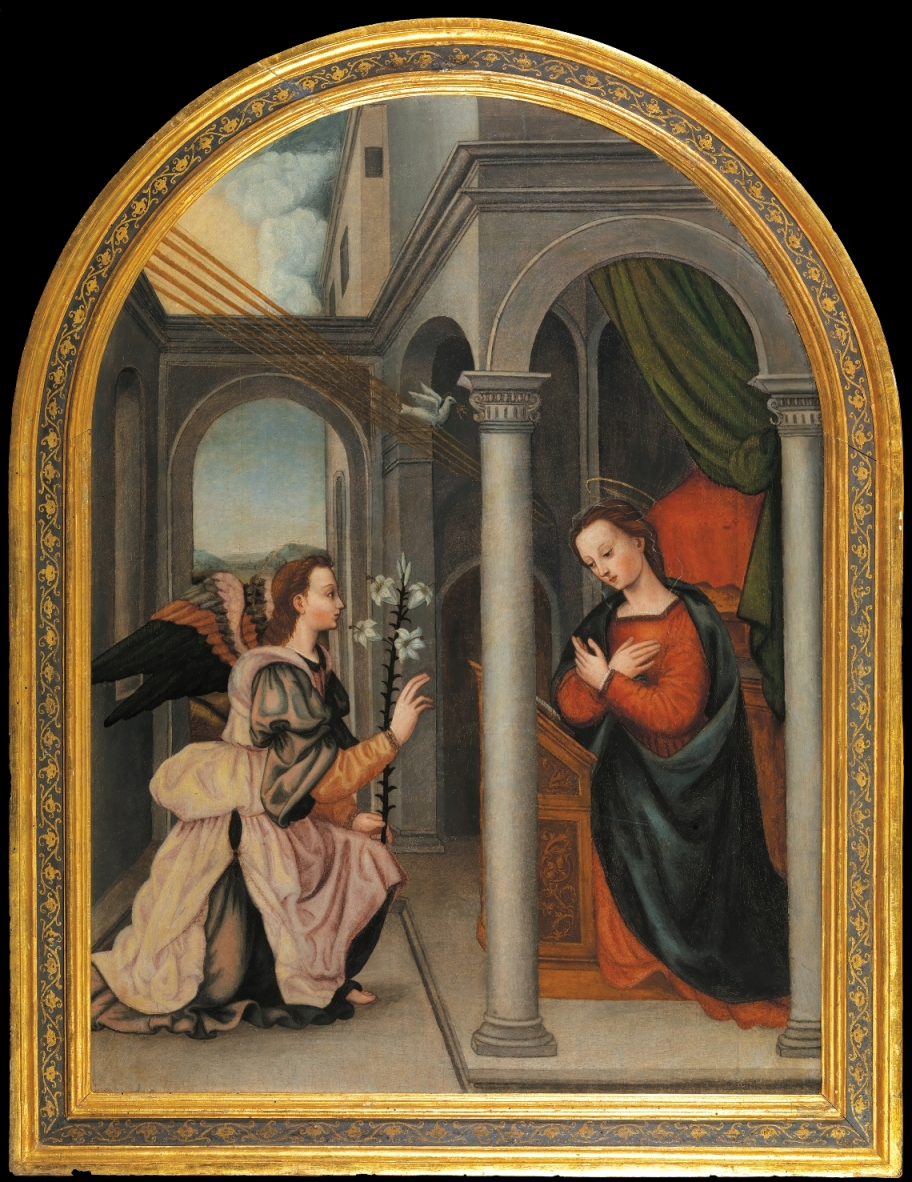
Annunciation

== Drawings ==
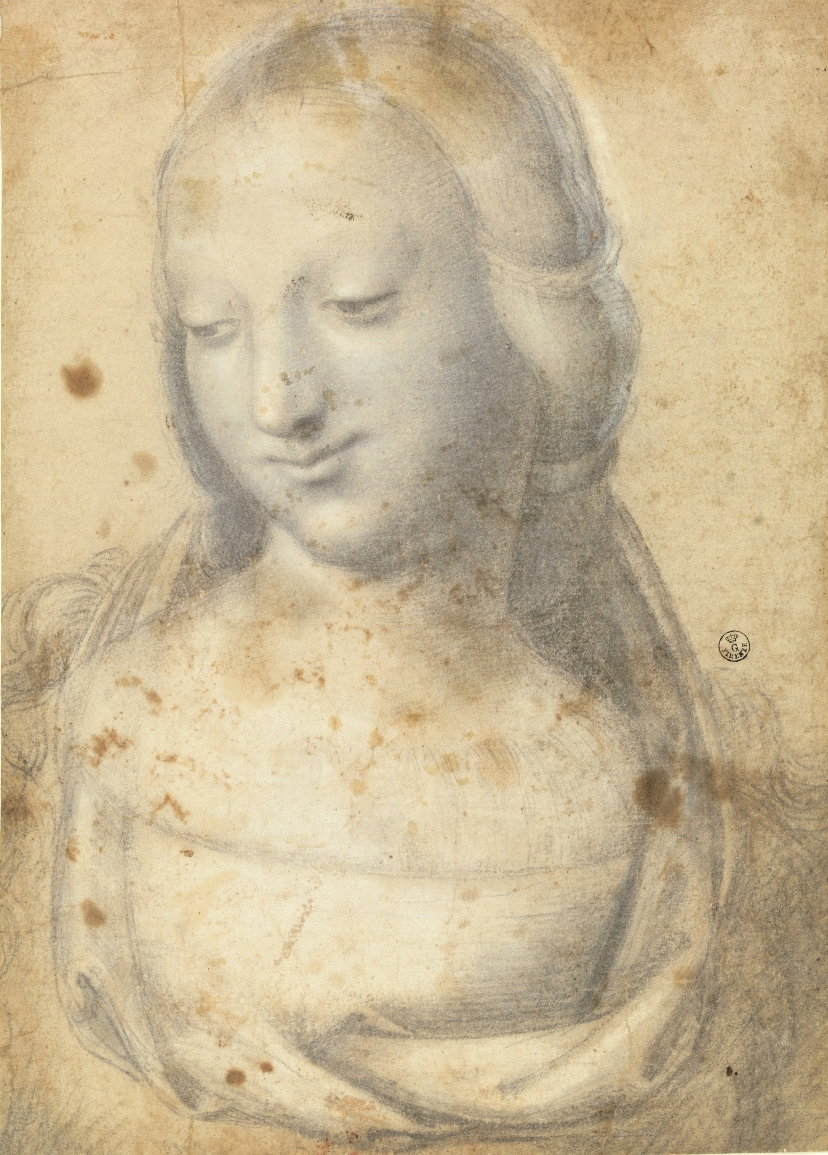
Bust of a Young Woman

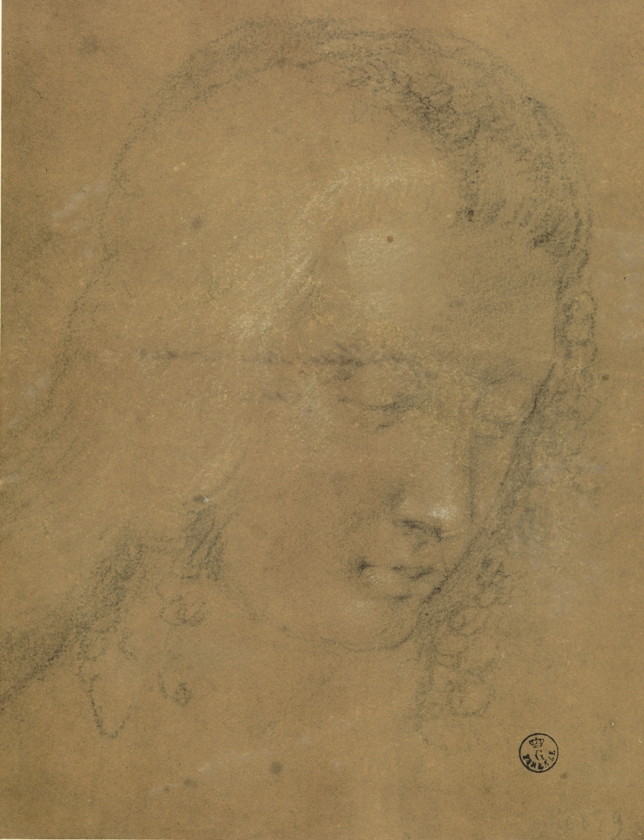
Head of a Youth

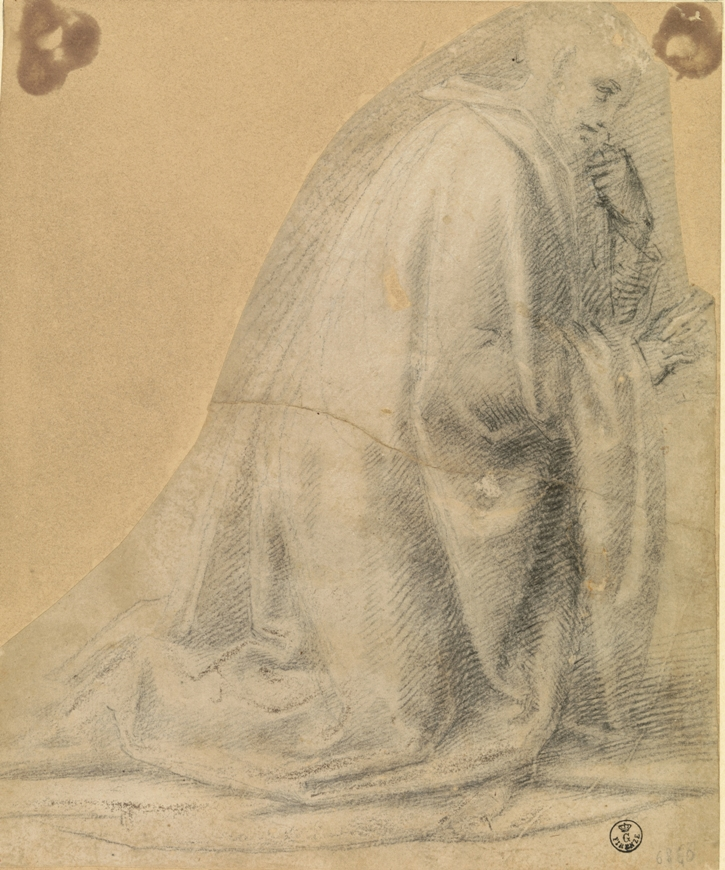
Kneeling Male Figure
