= Giovanna Fratellini =

Italian artist (1666–1731)

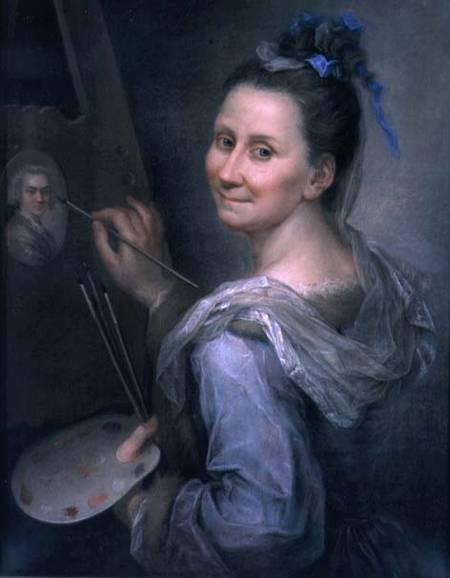
- Self-Portrait (1720)
- Born: 1666; Florence, Italy
- Died: 18 April 1731 (aged 64–65)
- Known for: Painting
- Movement: Baroque

Giovanna Fratellini (1666–1731) was a Florentine artist during the Baroque period. Born in Florence as Giovanna Marrmocchini Cortesi, she married Guiliano Fratellini in 1685 and changed her name to Fratellini. This well-born woman pastellist was a lady-in-waiting to Vittoria della Rovere, the Grand Duchess of Tuscany.

== Training ==
Fratellini was trained in painting and music under the ducal auspices, before which she trained with Livio Mehus and Pietro Dandini. Her works consist of oil, pastel, miniature enamel and chalk. She is primarily renowned for her portrait works but she also painted fables, bacchanals and historical subjects, such as the Death of Lucretia (untraced).

After training in the art of miniature painting with the Capuchin painter Ippolito Galantini (1627–1706) and pastels with the noted Domenico Tempesti (c.1655–1737), she polished her skills with Anton Domenico Gabbiani. Fratellini was accepted into Florence's Accademia del disegno in 1706 and elevated to full member in 1710.

== Portraiture and commissions ==
Fratellini's portrait works were the means to her success, and her sitters were considered the epitome of eighteenth-century refinement. Her works depicted a model of both noble and virtuous eighteenth-century refinement. Fratellini's depiction of Ceilia Pazzi (1720), part of her ‘child lady’ series, honours the young girls of noble birth in adult poses and adult features and characteristics.

In addition to portraits, Fratellini is documented as a religious painter for Cosimo III. Prince Ferndinando commissioned several historical and mythological pieces in pastel. Her commissioned works were invoiced and recorded as having received up to 15 scudi for each completed portrait in pastel on paper. Violante Beatrix Von Bayern, governor of Siena and wife of Tuscany's hereditary prince Ferninando de’ Medici, commissioned her to portray many of the ladies at the court. Fratellini accepted the task to commemorate the prominent circle of courtly ladies.

Violante Beatrix sent Fratellini to Bologna to portray Maria Klementyna Sobieska, the wife of the exiled James Francis Edward Stuart. James Stuart later requested portraits of his sons. Following her stay in Bologna, she travelled to Venice to portray Violanta Beatrix's sister-in-law, Teresa Kunigunda Sobieska (1676–1730) and Maria Klementyna's aunt. Fratellini is frequently compared to the Venetian Painter Rosalba Carriera (1675–1757). During her stay in Venice, she met Rosalba Carriera. Fratellini is noted as having great admiration for Carriera, who also extended her “gentillissime accoglienze”, or kind hospitality.

Villa Petraia, a Medici villa that became the residence of the King of Italy during Florence's brief time as the Italian capital city during 1870, is located outside of Florence and is the home to some of Fratellini's best-known works in pastel. Also, many of her works are pending restoration or maintenance and can be found in the Uffizi’s deposits. A large number of her pastels that were commissioned by the Medici family are located there in the Uffizi’s portrait collection.

== Teacher and mentor ==
The Tuscan artists welcomed her. Throughout Fratellini’s lifetime, she shared her artistic expertise with several female painters, most notably, Maria Maddalena Gozzi Baldacci and Violante Beatrice Siries Cerroti, a Florentine painter who was named after the patroness and princess. Violante Beatrice Siries took Fratellini’s place as court painter after her death.

== Self-Portrait ==
Fratellini’s self-portrait, depicting herself in the act of painting, “Self Portrait”, 1720 is in the Uffizi Gallery. It is displayed in the Vasari Corridor. Although she is shown holding oil paints and working on a miniature portrait painting, the work is completed in pastel. She portrays herself as an attractive and lively middle-aged woman. She is seen with energy and charm. Fratellini's signature elements, fluttering ribbons, are spryly worn. In the painting, she can be seen working on a portrait of her son Lorenzo Fratellini, whose death in 1729 preceded her own by two years. Along with her son, Lorenzo, Fratellini taught Violante Beatrice Siries.

== On television ==
The Emmy-winning PBS television documentary (June 2013) Invisible Women, Forgotten Artists of Florence, based on Dr. Jane Fortune's book by the same title, features a segment on Giovanna Fratellini as an example of women artists teaching other women in Baroque Florence. The television special, which spotlights the thousands of works by women in storage in Florence's museums, including many of Fratellini's pastels and portraiture, reveals the ‘creative ties and artistic succession between artists Giovanna Fratellini, Violante Siries Cerroti and Anna Bacherini Piattoli.'
