= Marietta Robusti =

Italian artist (1560? – 1590)

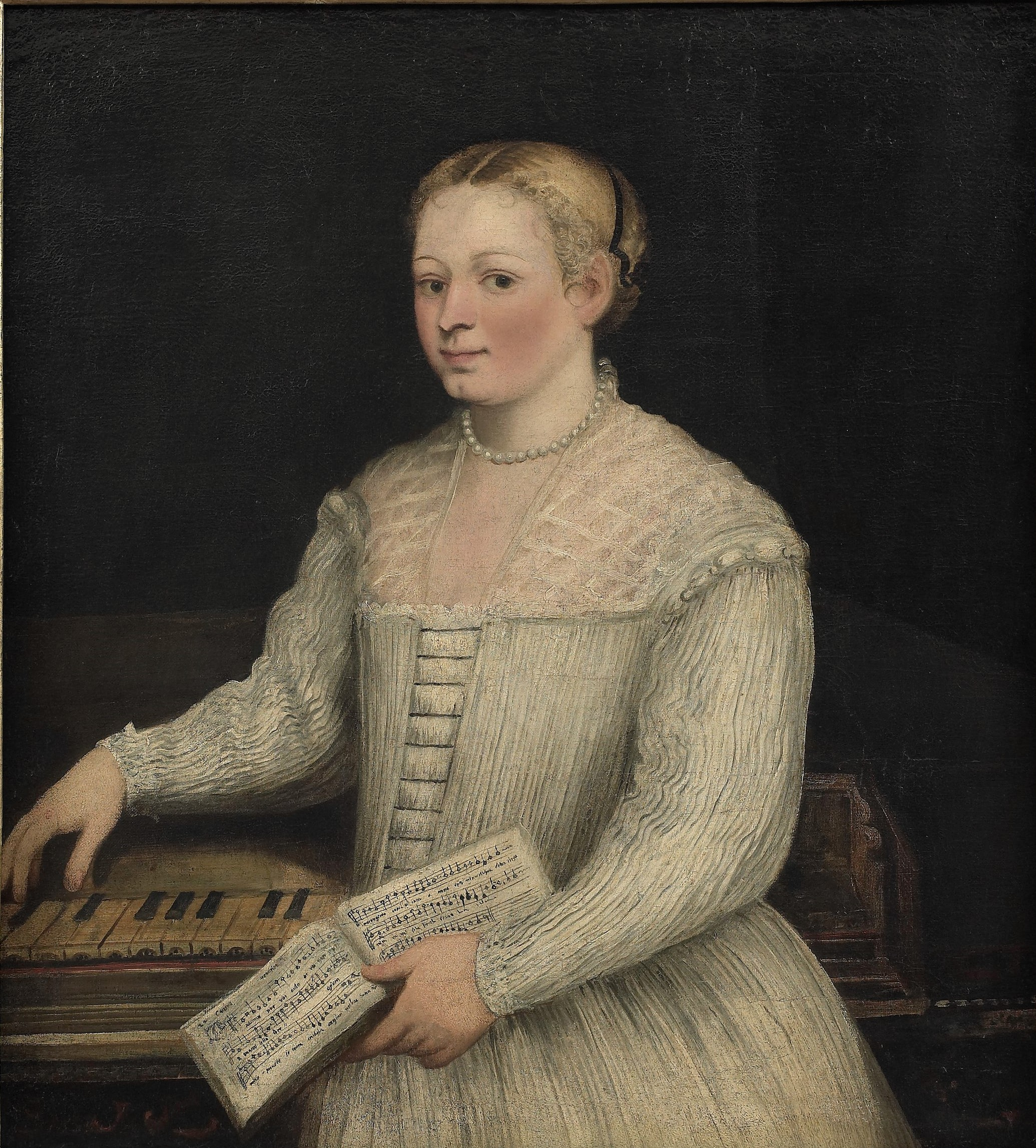
Self-portrait with a spinet, Uffizi (c. 1578)

Marietta Robusti (1560? – 1590) was a Venetian painter of the Renaissance period. She was the daughter of Tintoretto (Jacobo Robusti) and sometimes, is referred to as Tintoretta.

== Biography ==
Robusti is mentioned briefly in Il Riposo della Pitura e della Scultura by Raffaelo Borghini in 1584. The only known primary source for details of Marietta Robusti's life, however, is in Life of Tintoretto by Carlo Ridolfi that was published in 1642 about her father. These two sources disagree on the year of her birth: according to Borghini, she was born in 1555, but Carlo Ridolfi indicates that she was born in 1560. She probably was born in 1560 since her death during childbirth is recorded as at the age of thirty in 1590.

She lived in Venice all her life. She was the eldest daughter of the painter Jacopo Robusti, from whom she inherited not only his aptitude, but also her nickname, la Tintoretta (translated as female "little dyer", after the occupation of her grandfather as a tintore or dyer). Because of this, she is known variously as Marietta Robusti, Marietta Tintoretto, or "la Tintoretta". The name of her mother is not known. Ridolfi describes Robusti's close relationship with her father at great length. Not only did she learn at his knee, as a child she would dress as a boy so that she could go everywhere with Tintoretto. She was followed by seven siblings, three half-brothers and four half-sisters born to her stepmother, Tintoretto's wife Faustina Episcopi. Two of her half-brothers became painters as well, the most famous was Domenico.

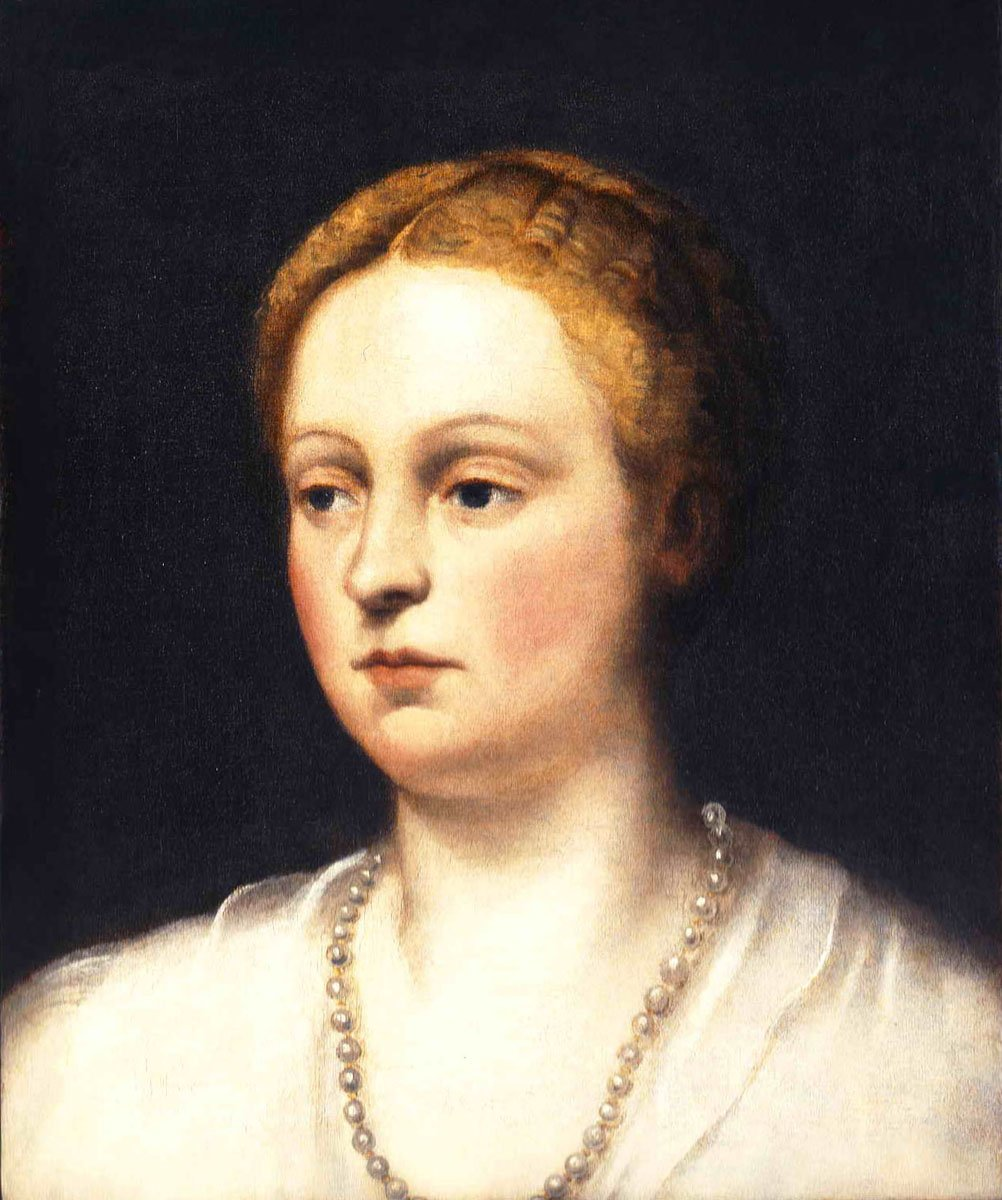
Portrait of a Lady by Tintoretto is of his daughter and skilled assistant, Marietta Robusti

Robusti's artistic training consisted of serving an apprenticeship in the collaborative environment of her father's workshop, where she probably contributed to her father's paintings by executing backgrounds and figure blocking, as was the usual distribution of labor in painting workshops of the time. She also served as the subject in many of her father's paintings. It is reported that the grieving Tintorentto created his last portrait of Marietta, postmortem, on her deathbed.

Although Robusti's social and economic autonomy was no greater than other artisan women of her time, she had quite a following, changing the ideals of femininity within the arts. After her death, Carlo Ridolfi stated she was one of the most illustrious women of her time, having the same manner of skill as her father while displaying "sentimental femininity, a womanly grace that is strained and resolute". It was said that while Robusti worked in her father's studio, she also worked on altarpieces as an assistant, but her achievements were ascribed to her father. No evidence exists that Robusti received commissions for major religious works such as altarpieces or other church decorations. She was recognized mainly as a portraitist, however, Emperor Maximilian and King Philip II of Spain both expressed interest in hosting her as a court painter so knowledge of her skills had to be known to contemporaries. Apparently, her father refused their invitations on her behalf because he couldn't bear to part with her.

In 1578, Tintoretto arranged for Marietta to marry a Venetian jeweler and silversmith, Mario Augusta, to ensure that she would remain near him. She died during childbirth and was buried in Santa Maria del’Orto in Venice in 1590.

After her death, a noticeable decline in the work produced by Tintoretto was ascribed to his grief over the loss of his daughter, rather than the likelihood that he lost his most skillful assistant.

== Attributions and assessment ==
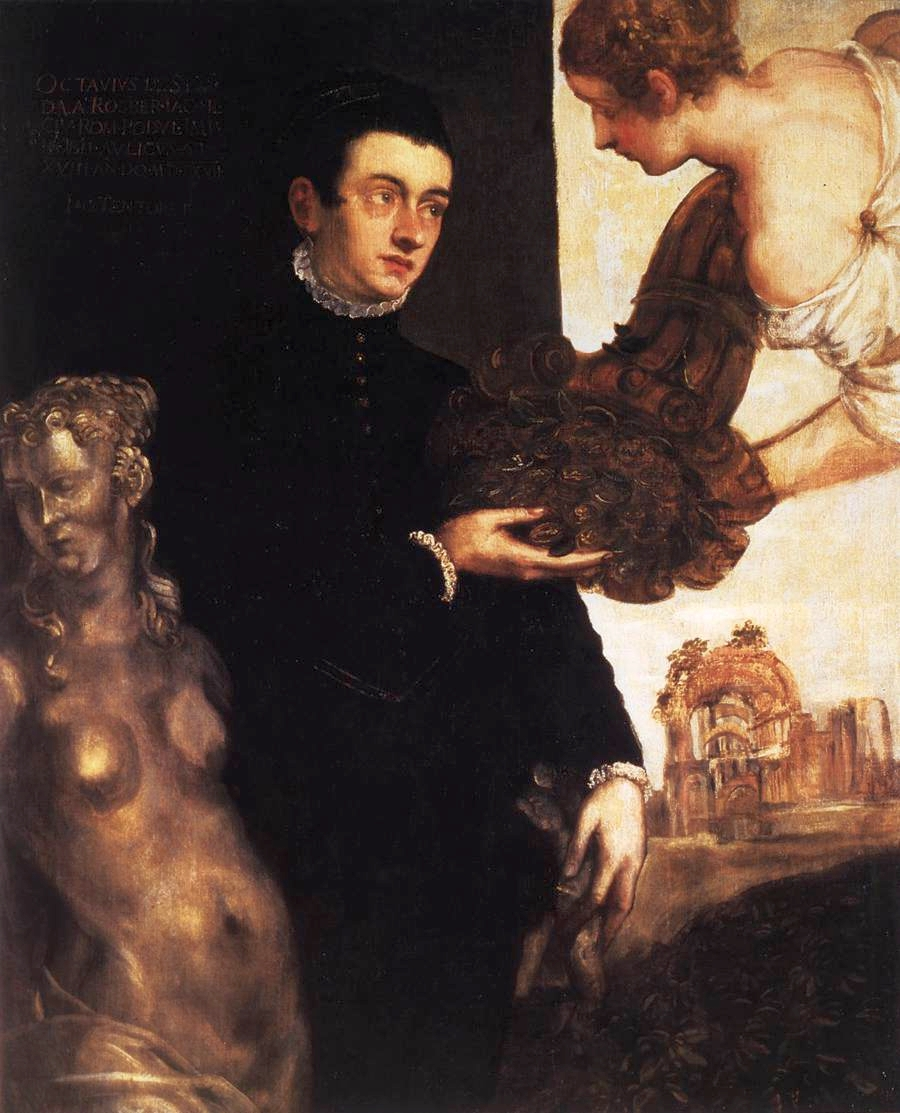
Portrait of Ottavio Strada now attributed to Marietta Robusti rather than her father - Rijksmuseum, Amsterdam

Since conventions of the time dictated that women remain in domestic spheres and were not welcome in the public world of art production and sale, Robusti and her female contemporaries only gained access to participate in the professional art world through their male relatives who were recognized as artists.

Given the suppression of recognition of her work, until modern times the only painting that had been attributed conclusively to Marietta Robusti was her Self-portrait (c. 1580; Uffizi Gallery, Florence). This portrait depicts Marietta posed before a harpsichord, holding a musical text that has been identified as a madrigal by Philippe Verdelot, "Madonna per voi ardo". It has been postulated by one reviewer that the inclusion of the text of this madrigal, whose opening lines are "My Lady, I burn with love for you and you do not believe it", suggests that the painting was created for a specific male viewer. This speculation suggests that it might have been intended for viewing by her husband.

Other attributions now include three more paintings. Old Man and a Boy (c. 1585; Kunsthistorisches Museum, Vienna) that was long considered one of the finest portraits by her father, was revealed in 1920 to be painted by Marietta Robusti. Portrait of Ottavio Strada (Rijksmuseum, Amsterdam) now is attributed to her rather than to her father. Portrait of Two Men (Gemäldegalerie Alte Meister, Dresden) that is signed "MR" is thought to be the only surviving work known to be signed by Marietta Robusti.

== Inspiration for Romantic artists ==
Following Marietta Robusti's death she became a muse for Romantic painters such as Léon Cogniet who produced Tintoretto Painting His Dead Daughter in 1846. Eleuterio Pagliano painted Tintoretto and His Daughter in 1861. The trope of women artists being transformed from creators to subjects for male counterparts made her a motif for male creativity, displaying a dying muse of "quietly suffering femininity".
