= Advancing Women Artists Foundation =

Non-profit organization

- Type: American Not-for-profit Organization
- Industry: Art
- Founded: 2009
- Headquarters: Indianapolis, US, and Florence, Italy
- Website: advancingwomenartists.org

Advancing Women Artists Foundation (AWA) was an American not-for-profit organization (501(c)(3)), with headquarters in Indianapolis, Indiana, and Florence, Italy. AWA is committed to identifying and restoring artwork by Florence's female artists in the city's museums, churches, and storehouses. The foundation achieves its mission through sponsoring restoration of artwork, and promoting research on female artists. As of 2018, AWA has restored 61 paintings and sculptures from the 15th century to the 19th century. It supports the creation of educational materials and events, including books, television documentaries, seminars, and conferences.

Advancing Women Artists closed its doors on June 30, 2021. Although the organization is no longer operative, the website will remain accessible as a digital archive and a resource for those interested in research, restoration and exhibition of art by women in Florence.

== Goals ==
In addition to restoration, research, and exhibition, the ultimate goal of AWA is to provide art by women an exhibition space of its own in Florence with satellite spaces established worldwide, where paintings and sculptures can be exhibited and eventually return to Florence permanently.

== Creation and governance ==
In 2003, author and philanthropist Dr. Jane Fortune founded The Florence Committee of the National Museum for Women in the Arts, an Italian not-for-profit association in Florence. This all began when she picked up a book about Suor Plautilla Nelli, a sixteenth-century Florence painter whom she was unfamiliar with and realised the goal to bring awareness to little-known women artists. We later found out through more digging that Suor Plautilla Nelli was one of the first known female Renaissance artists and was a cloistered Dominican nun. In 2009, Fortune created a new organization, the Advancing Women Artists Foundation, its American non-profit sister organization, which allowed for more opportunities for American involvement.

AWA is supported by private contributors and institutions that are dedicated to safeguarding and promoting works by women artists, particularly in Florence, Italy. The Board of Trustees holds fiduciary responsibility for its organizational activities and financial well-being. AWA is supported by an International Advisory Council and assisted by an honorary Florentine Council of Advisors composed of museum directors, art historians, restorers, city officials, and art experts who advise the Foundation on its restorations, publications, and awareness-raising projects.

== AWA's honors program ==
Advancing Women Artists supports an ongoing annual awards program honoring museum directors in Florence, women restorers, patronesses of the arts and contemporary artists for their outstanding contributions to the culture of Florence. The awards are designed to give recognition to women within the Fine Arts sector by commending their commitment to enhancing Florence and its artistic heritage.

== Partial list of restorations ==
- Suor Plautilla Nelli (1524–1588):
  - Lamentation with Saints, San Marco Museum. (The Florence Committee.)
  - Saint Catherine in Prayer, Last Supper Museum of Andrea del Sarto.
  - Saint Dominic Receives the Rosary, Last Supper Museum of Andrea del Sarto.
  - Saint Catherine Receives the Stigmata, Last Supper Museum of Andrea del Sarto.
  - Last Supper Santa Maria Novella Museum in Florence
- Artemisia Gentileschi
  - David and Bathsheba, The Palatine Gallery, Royal Apartments. (The Florence Committee.)
- Félicie de Fauveau:
  - Burial monument to Louise de Favreau, Basilica of Santa Croce.
  - Burial monument to Madame Anne de la Pierre, Church of Santa Maria del Carmine.
- Irene Parenti Duclos:
  - Copy of Andrea del Sarto's Madonna de Sacco, Accademia Gallery.
- Violante Ferroni:
  - The Saint visits plague victims and The Saint gives bread to the poor, Church of San Giovanni di Dio.

== Books and publications ==
- Invisible Women: Forgotten Artists of Florence by Jane Fortune
- Art by Women in Florence: A Guide through Five Hundred Years by Jane Fortune and Linda Falcone
- Orate Pro Pictora by Jane Fortune
- DVD - Artemisia The Restoration
- DVD - Nelli The Lamentation
- DVD - Félicie De Fauveau A French Sculptor in Florence During the Grand Tour
- DVD - Invisible Women (won Emmy Award in 2013)
- Santa Croce in Pink

== Gallery ==
Selected restorations

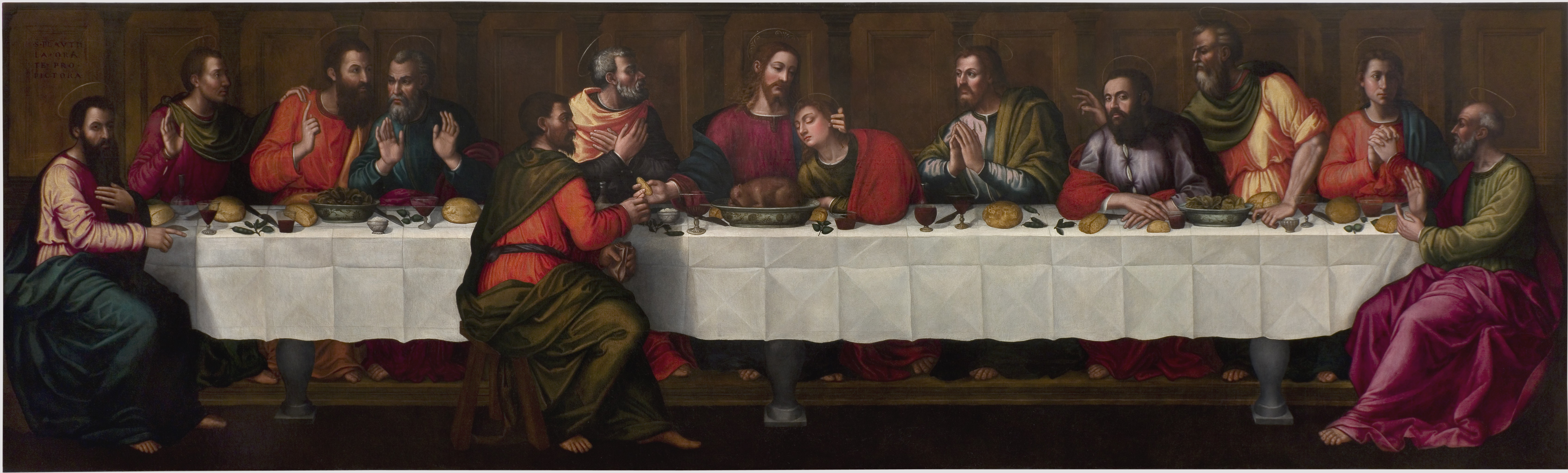
Plautilla Nelli - The Last Supper (in 2019)

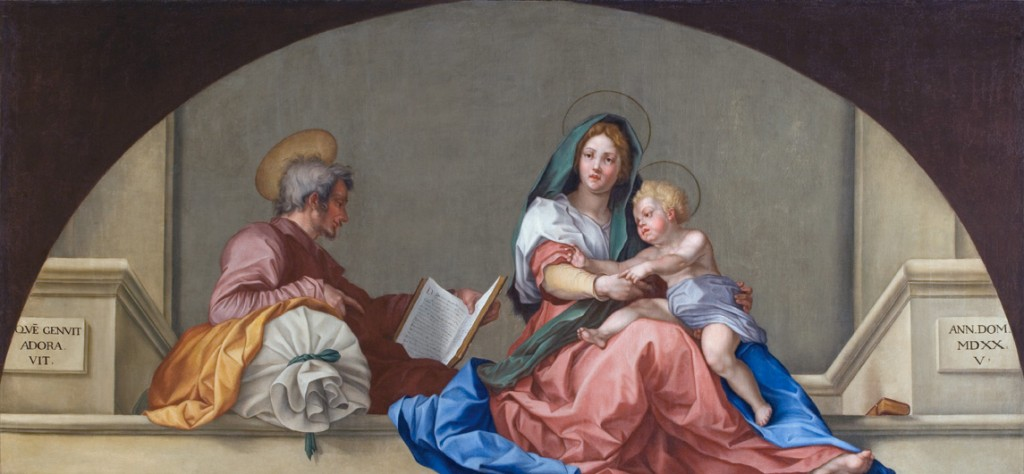
Irene Parenti Duclos - Copy of Andrea del Sarto's Madonna del Sacco
