= Maria Angelica Razzi =

Italian sculptor

Maria Angelica Razzi was an Italian sixteenth century nun and sculptor at Santa Caterina da Siena in Florence. She primarily worked in clay to make devotional terracotta figures.

== Life ==
Razzi was the second of her immediate family to enter into a Dominican convent in 1552. Her dowry was funded by her brother Girolamo. Her other brother, Serafino Razzi became a monk in 1549 and wrote about Santa Caterina da Siena in Florence and its nuns.

Art historian, Catherine Turrill suspects that Razzi may have been an active artist by 1560. While there are no surviving records in the convent that state that, her brother Serafino Razzi wrote that she created terracotta figures of the Madonna, saints, and angels. One of her figures was created for the rosary chapel in San Domenico in Perugia, and another, a Madonna and Child, was made for the sacristy of San Marco.

== Links ==
- About possibly works see: ilkiblog.blogspot.com/2019/02/maria-angelica-razzi.html
