= List of 17th-century women artists =

17th-century women artists – female painters, miniaturists, calligraphers, engravers and sculptors who were active in 17th century (born between 1580 and 1700).

== Asia ==
=== China ===
- Ma Shouzhen (c.1548–1604) – Gējì, painter, poet, and composer.
- Xue Susu (c.1564–1650?) – Gējì, poet, painter, archer, known as the "Woman of Ten Talents".
- Fang Weiyi (1585-1668) – aristocratic poet, calligrapher, painter, and literary historian.
- Lin Xue (d. after 1642) – Gējì, poet, painter, and calligrapher.
- Wen Shu (1595-1634) - painter, great-granddaughter of Wen Zhengming.
- Fu Daokun (fl.1626)
- Li Yin - (c.1610-1685) - Gējì, poet, painter, and calligrapher.
- Liu Rushi (1618-1664) - Gējì, scholar, poet, painter, and calligrapher.
- Gu Hengbo (1619-1664) - Gējì, poet, orchid painter.
- Dong Xiaowan (1624-1651) - Gējì, poet, painter.
- Cai Han (1647–1686) – the concubine of the painter Mao Xiang. His other painter concubine was Jin Yue.
- Lin Yining (1655 – c.1730) – poet and painter
- Chai Jingyi (d.1680) – aristocratic poet and painter.
- Chen Shu (1660–1736) – first female painter of Qing dynasty, painter's daughter.
- Ma Quan (17th-18th C) - flower-and-bird painter.

=== Japan ===
- Ono Otsū (1559 or 1568 – 1631) - noblewoman, calligrapher, poet, painter and musician.
- Kiyohara Yukinobu (1643–1682) - daughter of painter Kusumi Morikage.

=== Korea ===
- Shin Saimdang (1504-1551) - poet, calligrapher, painter.
- Hŏ Nansŏrhŏn (1563-1589) - poet, painter.

== Americas ==
- Isabel de Santiago (1666 – ca. 1714) a Criollo colonial painter born in the colony of Quito (Ecuador), daughter of painter Miguel de Santiago.

== Europe ==
=== British Isles: England & Scotland ===
- Esther Inglis (1571–1624), worked in Scotland.
- Joan Carlile (c. 1606–1679)
- Mary Beale (1633-1699)
- Elizabeth Creed (1642–1728) - aristocrat, artist and philanthropist, amateur painter. Cousin of the poet John Dryden.
- Elizabeth Haselwood (c. 1644 – 1715) - the only woman silversmith recorded as having worked in Norwich.
- Susan Penelope Rosse (1652–1700) - miniaturist, daughter of painter Richard Gibson.
- Anne Killigrew (1660–1685) - poet and painter, portrait painter at the court of James II
- Apollonia Kickius (1669 -1695) (or Kickieus or Kickeus) - active in Scotland. Daughter of artist Edward Kickius (thought to be German or Dutch and also known as Everhardus Kickius or Everard Kick)
- Molly Verney (1675 - 1696) - noblewoman, porcelain and Lacquer craftswoman, author
- Sarah Hoadly (1676-1743) - wife of painter Benjamin Hoadly.
- Penelope Cleyn (active 1668–1677) - daughter of the German painter and tapestry designer Francis Cleyn. Her sisters Sarah and Magdalen were also painters.
- Mrs Pawling (active from c. 1690 to c. 1700), possibly the wife of painter Isaac Paling.
- Adriana Verelst (c. 1683-1769)

=== France ===
- Suzanne de Court (fl. 1600) - enamel painter in the Limoges workshops, possibly the daughter of Jean de Court
- Louise Moillon (1610 - 1696) - painter of still lifes, of an artist family who were Protestant refugees from the southern Netherlands.
- Claudine Brunand (1630-1674) - poet and engraver, daughter of engraver Aymé Brunand.
- Catherine Duchemin (1630-1698) - painter, 1st female member of Academia (1664), daughter of the sculptor Jaques Duchemin, wife of Girardon.
- Claudine Bouzonnet-Stella (1636-1697) engraver, daughter of Étienne Bouzonnet, a goldsmith
- Antoinette Bouzonnet-Stella (c. 1641 - 1676) - engraver, daughter of Étienne Bouzonnet, a goldsmith
- Françoise Bouzonnet-Stella (1638-1691) - engraver, daughter of Étienne Bouzonnet, a goldsmith
- Geneviève Boullogne (1645-1708) - daughter of painter Louis de Boullogne. Member of Academia.
- Madeleine Boullogne (1646-1710) - daughter of painter Louis de Boullogne. Member of Academia.
- Elisabeth Sophie Cheron (1648 - 1711) - poet, painter, member of Academia. Daughter of painter Henri Chéron
- Marie Courtois (c. 1655 – 1703) miniature painter
- Marie-Geneviève Hérault (c. 1655 – c. 1712)
- Marie Blancour (active 1650 – 1699)

=== Germany ===
- Susanna Mayr (1600-1674) - daughter of the painter Johann Georg Fischer
- Anna Maria van Schurman (1607-1678) - engraver, poet, classical scholar, philosopher.
- Anna Katharina Block (1642-1719) - daughter of the flower painter Johann Thomas Fischer, taught the Duchess Anna Maria of Mecklenburg-Schwerin and her daughters
- Maria Sibylla Merian (1647-1717) - entomologist, naturalist and scientific illustrator. Daughter of engraver and publisher Matthäus Merian the Elder
- Johanna Sibylla Küsel (1650-1717) - engraver, daughter of painter Melchior Küsel.
- Magdalena Fürstin (1652-1717) - hand-colourist.
- Johanna Helena Herolt (1668-after 1723) - botanical artist, daughter of the painters Maria Sibylla Merian and Johann Andreas Graff.
- Dorothea Maria Graff (1678–1743) - daughter of the painters Maria Sibylla Merian and Johann Andreas Graff.

=== Italy ===
Born in 16th-century:

- Sofonisba Anguissola (c.1532–1625)
- Diana Scultori Mantuana (1547–1612) – engraver, daughter of the sculptor and engraver Giovanni Battista Ghisi. One of the first female engravers.
- Mariangiola Criscuolo (c.1548–1630) – daughter of painter Giovanni Filippo Criscuolo.
- Barbara Longhi (1552–1638) – daughter of painter Luca Longhi
- Lavinia Fontana (1552–1614) – daughter of painter Prospero Fontana. First female career artist in Western Europe as she relied on commissions for her income.
- Geronima Parasole (1569–1622) – wood block cutter and print maker
- Isabella Parasole (c.1570–c.1620) – wood engraver
- Fede Galizia (1578 – c. 1630) – pioneering still-life painter, daughter of painter Nunzio Galizia.
- Chiara Varotari (1584–1663) – daughter of painter Dario Varotari the Elder
- Lucrina Fetti (c.1590–1651) – daughter of painter Pietro Fetti, nun
- Angelica Veronica Airola (c.1590–1670) – nun
- Caterina Ginnasi (1590–1660) – painter, niece of cardinal
- Artemisia Gentileschi (1593–c.1656)
- Orsola Maddalena Caccia (1596–1676) – nun, religious painter, daughter of Guglielmo Caccia.
- Maria Eufrasia della Croce (1597–1676) – nun, painter
- Suor Orsola Maddalena Caccia (1596–1676) – daughter of painter Guglielmo Caccia, nun
- Arcangela Paladini (1599–1622) – daughter of painter Filippo Paladini
- Giovanna Garzoni (1600–1670) – niece of painter Pietro Gaia, worked at the court of the Duke of Alcala, the court of the Duke of Savoy and as official court painter for the Grand Duke Ferdinando II Medici.

Born in 17th century:

- Antonia Bertucci-Pinelli (died c. 1640)
- Anna Maria Vaiani (died c. 1655) - engraver, daughter of painter Alessandro Vaiani.
- Alba Foresti - embroider and lace-maker, mother of Rosalba Carriera
- Caterina Angiola Pieroncini - lace-maker, embroiderer and lady-in-waiting for the Grand Duchess Vittoria della Rovere.
- Anna Angelica Allegrini - daughter of painter Francesco Allegrini da Gubbio.
- Prudentia Stiattesi - daughter and pupil of Artemisia Gentileschi
- Sister Luisa Capomazza (c. 1600 – 1646) - nun
- Virginia Vezzi (1600–1638) - wife of painter Simon Vouet.
- Diana de Rosa (1602–1643) - daughter of painter Tommaso de Rosa.
- Maddalena Corvina (1607-1664) - painter and engraver. Niece of painter Francesco da Castello.
- Plautilla Bricci (1616-1705) - architect, painter and sculptor; she was the only female architect of her day
- Ginevra Cantofoli (1608/1618-1672)
- Theresa Maria Coriolano (1620-1671) - engraver, daughter of the engraver Bartolommeo Coriolano, pupil of E. Sirani
- Agnese Dolci (1635-1686) - daughter of painter Carlo Dolci.
- Elisabetta Sirani (1638-1665) - painter and printmaker, established first school for other women artists. Daughter of painter Giovanni Andrea Sirani.
- Barbara Sirani (1641 – 1692). Daughter of painter Giovanni Andrea Sirani.
- Anna Maria Sirani (1645 – 1715). Daughter of painter Giovanni Andrea Sirani.
  - Lucrezia Bianchi - pupil of E. Sirani, daughter of painter Baldassare Bianchi
  - Angela Cantelli Cavazza - possilbly the pupil of E. Sirani
  - Vincenza Fabbri - pupil of E. Sirani
  - Lucretia Forni - pupil of E. Sirani
  - Veronica Franchi - pupil of E. Sirani
  - Camelia Lanteri - pupil of E. Sirani
  - Caterina Pepoli - pupil of E. Sirani
- Caterina Mongardi (1645 – 1680) - pupil of E. Sirani
- Laura Bernasconi (active in 1670s) - flower painter
- Lucrezia Scarfaglia (active 1677–1678)
- Teresa del Pò (1649–1716) - daughter of painter Pietro del Pò.
- Camilla Lauteri (1650/9 - 1681) - pupil of E. Sirani
- Margherita Caffi (1650 – 1710) - painter of still lifes of flowers and fruit, member of artistic family
- Maria Vittoria Cassana (died 1711) - daughter of painter Giovanni Francesco Cassana.
- Veronica Fontana (1651-1690) - engraver, daughter of the engraver Domenico Maria Fontana.
- Elena Recco (c. 1654 – 1715) - daughter of the still-life painter Giuseppe Recco, worked at the Spanish court.
- Maria Oriana Galli Bibiena - mannerist portraitist and history painter, member of the Galli da Bibbiena family of artists of Tuscan origin
- Francesca Volò Smiller (Vincenzina) (1657 - 1700) - sister of Margherita Caffi.
- Lucrezia Ferraria - studied with Vincenzina
- Maria Cattarina Locatelli (d. 1723) - member of artistic family
- Angiola Teresa Moratori Scanabecchi (1662 –1708)
- Giovanna Fratellini (Marmocchini Cortesi) (1666 - 1731) - court painter and teacher
- Maria Elena Panzacchi (1668-1737)
- Caterina Angela Pierozzi (c. 1670 – 1690) - member of artistic family, worked for Grand Duchess Vittoria della Rovere.
- Anna Maria Arduino (1672-1700) - princess, painter, writer, poet
- Isabella Maria dal Pozzo (died 1700) - aristocrat, worked in the court of Princess Henriette Adelaide of Savoy
- Rosalba Carriera (1673-1757) - miniaturist and pastel painter
- Giovana Carriera (1675-1737) - sister of Rosalba
- Angela Carriera (1677-1760) - sister of Rosalba
- Lucia Casalini Torelli (1677–1762) - wife of painter Felice Torelli
- Faustina Maratti (c. 1679–1745) - poet and painter, natural daughter of the painter Carlo Maratta
- Giulia Lama (1681-1747)
- Maria Giovanna Clementi (1692-1761)
- Caterina Tarabotti (active until 1690) - sister of proto-feminist writer Arcangela Tarabotti
- Elisabetta Marchioni (fl. ca. 1700) - flower painter
- Gentile Zanardi - member of artistic family

=== Malta ===
- Sister Maria de Dominici (1643–1707) - from painters' family, nun. Pupil of Mattia Preti.

=== Spanish Netherlands / Dutch Republic ===
Born in 16th-century:

- Margaretha toe Boecop (before 1551 – after 1610) - daughter of female painter of Mechtelt van Lichtenberg
- Cornelia toe Boecop (1551 - after 1629) - daughter of female painter of Mechtelt van Lichtenberg
- Colette van den Keere (1568–1629) - engraver, daughter of foundry artist Hendrik van den Keere
- Anna Roemersdr. Visscher (1584–1652) - artist, poet, translator, glass engraver.
- Maria Tesselschade Visscher (1594–1649) - poet and glass engraver.
- Clara Peeters (fl. 1607–1621)

Born in 17th century:

- Apollonia van Veen (died 1635) - pastellist, daughter of painter Pieter van Veen.
- Isabella Francken (active in the 1st part of the 17th century) - member of the large Francken family of artists
- Catharina van Knibbergen (active in 1630s) - perhaps the daughter of the painter François van Knibbergen
- Eva van Marle (active in 1640-1650s) - "monogrammist E.M." (?)
- Magdalena van de Passe (1600-1638) - engraver and member of the Van de Passe family of artists
- Susanna van Steenwijk (after 1601-1664) - painter of small architectural exteriors
- Gertruida van Veen (1602-1643) - daughter of the painter Otto van Veen.
- Maria de Grebber (1602-1680) - daughter of the painter Frans Pietersz de Grebber.
- Margaretha de Heer (1603-1665) - painter of birds and insects, daughter of the glass painter Arjen Willems de Heer.
- Anna Francisca de Bruyns (1604–1675) - cousin of painter Jacob Franquart.
- Michaelina Wautier (1604–1689)
- Sara van Baalbergen (1607 – after 1638) - the first female member of the Haarlem Guild of St. Luke
- Catarina Ykens (I) (1608/1618 – after 1666) - daughter of the history painter Lucas Floquet.
- Judith Leyster (1609-1660)
- Catharina Peeters (1615–1676) - from artists' family
- Magdalena van den Hecken (1615-after 1635) - flower painter, daughter of the painter Samuel van den Hecken.
- Katharina Pepijn (1619–1688) - daughter of painter Marten Pepijn.
- Geertruydt Roghman (1625-1657) - engraver, daughter of the engraver Henrick Lambertsz Roghman
- Margaretha van Godewijk (1627-1677) - poet and painter
- Maria van Oosterwijck (1630–1693) - flower painter
- Johanna Vergouwen (1630–1714) – daughter of painter-decorator Louis Vergouwen.
- Gesina ter Borch (1631-1690) - watercolorist and draftswoman, poet, daughter of Gerard ter Borch the Elder.
- Katharina Rozee (1632 – 1682) – embroider
- Catharina Oostfries (1636–1708) - glass painter, sister of glass painter Jozef Oostfries
- Geertgen Wyntges (1636-1712) - flower painter.
- Magdalena Roghman (1637-1679) - engraver, daughter of the engraver Henrick Lambertsz Roghman
- Maria Theresa van Thielen (1640–1706) - daughter of painter Jan Philip van Thielen.
- Sara Saftleven (1645-1702) - flower painter, daughter of the landscape painter Herman Saftleven
- Maria Schalcken (1645–1699) - sister and pupil of Godfried Schalcken
- Aleijda Wolfsen (1648-1692)
- Diana Glauber (1650- c. 1721) - daughter of the Amsterdam chemist Johann Rudolph Glauber, and the sister of the painters Jan Gotlief and Johannes Glauber
- Joanna Koerten (1650-1715) - excelled in painting, drawing, embroidery, glass etching, and wax modeling
- Marie Duchatel (1652–1692) - painter and miniaturist with international career. Daughter of painter François Duchatel.
- Adriana Spilberg (1652-1700) - daughter of painter Johannes Spilberg, court painter in Düsseldorf
- Cornelia de Rijck (1653 - 1726) - specialized in painting birds and insects.
- Sophia Holt (1658 – 1734) - member of Holt-Greve artistic family
- Catarina Ykens (II) (1659 - 1737 or later) - daughter of the painter Johannes Ykens, geestelycke dochter (spiritual daughter), semi-nun.
- Cornelia van Marle (1661–1698) - member of Holt-Greve artistic family
- Alida Withoos (c. 1661/62 –1730) - botanical artist and painter, daughter of painter Mathias Withoos.
- Maria Withoos (1663–after 1699) - daughter of painter Mathias Withoos.
- Anna Ruysch (1666-1754) - flower painter, daughter of Frederik Ruysch, a botanist and anatomist.
- Anna Maria de Koker (1666 -1698) - printmaker, etcher and poet
- Aleida Greve (1670–1742) - member of Holt-Greve artistic family
- Anna Cornelia Holt (1671–1692) - member of Holt-Greve artistic family
- Maria de Wilde (1682-1729) - engraver and playwright, daughter of collector Jacob de Wilde.

=== Spain & Portugal ===
- Josefa de Óbidos (Josefa de Ayala) (c. 1630 – 1684) - Spanish-born Portuguese painter, daughter of painter Baltazar Gomes Figueira.
- Maria de Abarca (active between 1630 and 1656)
- Luisa Roldán (1652–1706) - the earliest woman sculptor documented in Spain, daughter of sculptor Pedro Roldán, "Sculptor of the Chamber" to Carlos II.
- Teresa Agüesca (1654-?) - engraver, daughter of engraver Juan Jerónimo Agüesca.
- Luisa de Morales (1654 – after 1685) - daughter and disciple of Juan de Valdés Leal.
- María de la Concepción de Morales - daughter and disciple of Juan de Valdés Leal, nun
- Andrea de Mena (1654-1734) - sculptor, daughter of sculptor Pedro de Mena.
- Claudia de Mena (1655-?) - sculptor, daughter of sculptor Pedro de Mena
- Francisca Palomino y Velasco (1655-1726)

=== Sweden & Finland ===
- Brita von Cöln (d. 1707) - painter
- Amalia von Königsmarck (1663–1740) - noblewoman, dilettante
- Anna Maria Ehrenstrahl (1666–1729) - painter, daughter of the painter David Klöcker Ehrenstrahl.
- Margareta Capsia (1682–1759) - the first professional native female artist in Finland, which during her lifetime was a part of Sweden.
- Anna Maria Thelott (1683–1710) - an engraver, an illustrator, a woodcut-artist, and a miniaturist painter. Daughter of engraver and watchmaker Philip Jacob Thelott the Elder.
- Helena Arnell (1697–1751) - painter

=== Switzerland ===
- Eva Abyberg (1588–1669)
- Anna Waser (1678–1714)

== Books ==
- Babette Bohn, The Antique Heroines of Elisabetta Sirani, in Renaissance Studies, vol. 16, n. 1, Wiley, 2002
- Babette Bohn, Women Artists, Their Patrons, and Their Publics in Early Modern Bologna, Pennsylvania, Pennsylvania State University Press, 2021
- Dabbs, J (ed.), Life Stories of Women Artists, 1550-1800. An Anthology (Farnham 2009).
- Dabbs, Julia. “Sex, Lies, and Anecdotes: Gender Relations in the Life Stories of Italian Women Artists, 1550-1800,” Aurora, VI (2005): 35.
- Fortunati, Vera, Jordana Pomeroy, and Claudio Strinati, Italian Women Artists from Renaissance to Baroque, Milan, Skira, 2007
- Harris, Anne Sutherland and Linda Nochlin, Women Artists: 1550–1950, Los Angeles County Museum of Art, Knopf, New York, 1976
- Heller, Nancy. Women Artists: An Illustrated History. New York: Abbeville Press, 1997. ISBN 0-7892-0345-6
- Gaetano Giordani, Notizie delle donne pittrici di Bologna, Bologna, Tipografia Nobili & C., 1832
- Fidière O. Les femmes artistes à l'Académie royale de peinture et de sculpture. Paris, 1885
- Jones, Tanja L. (ed.). Women Artists in the Early Modern Courts of Europe. c. 1450–1700
- Lucas, Martine. Des femmes peintres: du XVe à l'aube du XIXe siècle. Paris, 2015
- Nicholson, Elizabeth S. G. "Diana Scultori." Italian Women Artists from Renaissance to Baroque: National Museum of Women in the Arts. Milano: Skira, 2007
- Rocco, Patricia. The Devout Hand: Women, Virtue, and Visual Culture in Early Modern Italy, McGill-Queen's Press - MQUP, 2017
- “Splendid Japanese Women Artists of the Edo Period”. Special Exhibition on the 120th Anniversary of Jissen Women's Educational Institute, at the Kōsetsu Memorial Museum, Tokyo, April 18–June 21, 2015
- Weidner, M.S. Views from Jade Terrace : Chinese women artists, 1300-1912
- Yuho, Tseng. “Women Painters of the Ming Dynasty.” Artibus Asiae, vol. 53, no. 1/2, 1993, pp. 249–61.
