= Kiyohara (surname) =

Kiyohara (清原) is a Japanese surname. Notable people with the surname include:

- Kaya Kiyohara (清原 果耶; born 2002), Japanese actress, model and singer
- Kazuhiro Kiyohara (清原 和博; born 1967), Japanese television personality and former professional baseball player
- Kiyohara Tama (清原玉; 1861 – 1939), Japanese painter
- Kiyohara Yukinobu (清原雪信; 1643–1682), Japanese painter
- Nayu Kiyohara (清原 奈侑), Japanese softball player
- Yasuhira Kiyohara (清原 康平), Japanese army officer
- Shohei Kiyohara (清原 翔平; born 1987), Japanese football player
- Kiyohara no Motosuke (清原 元輔; 908 – 990), Japanese poet
- Kiyohara no Fukayabu (清原 深養父), Japanese poet
- Kiyohara clan, a powerful Japanese clan of the Heian era
