= Taruffi =

Taruffi is an Italian surname. Notable people with the surname include:

- Emilio Taruffi (1633–1696), Italian painter
- Piero Taruffi (1906–1988), Italian racing driver
- Giuseppe Antonio Taruffi (1715–1786), Italian poet and chess master
