= Waxwings, Cherry Blossoms, and Bamboo =

Painting by Kiyohara Yukinobu

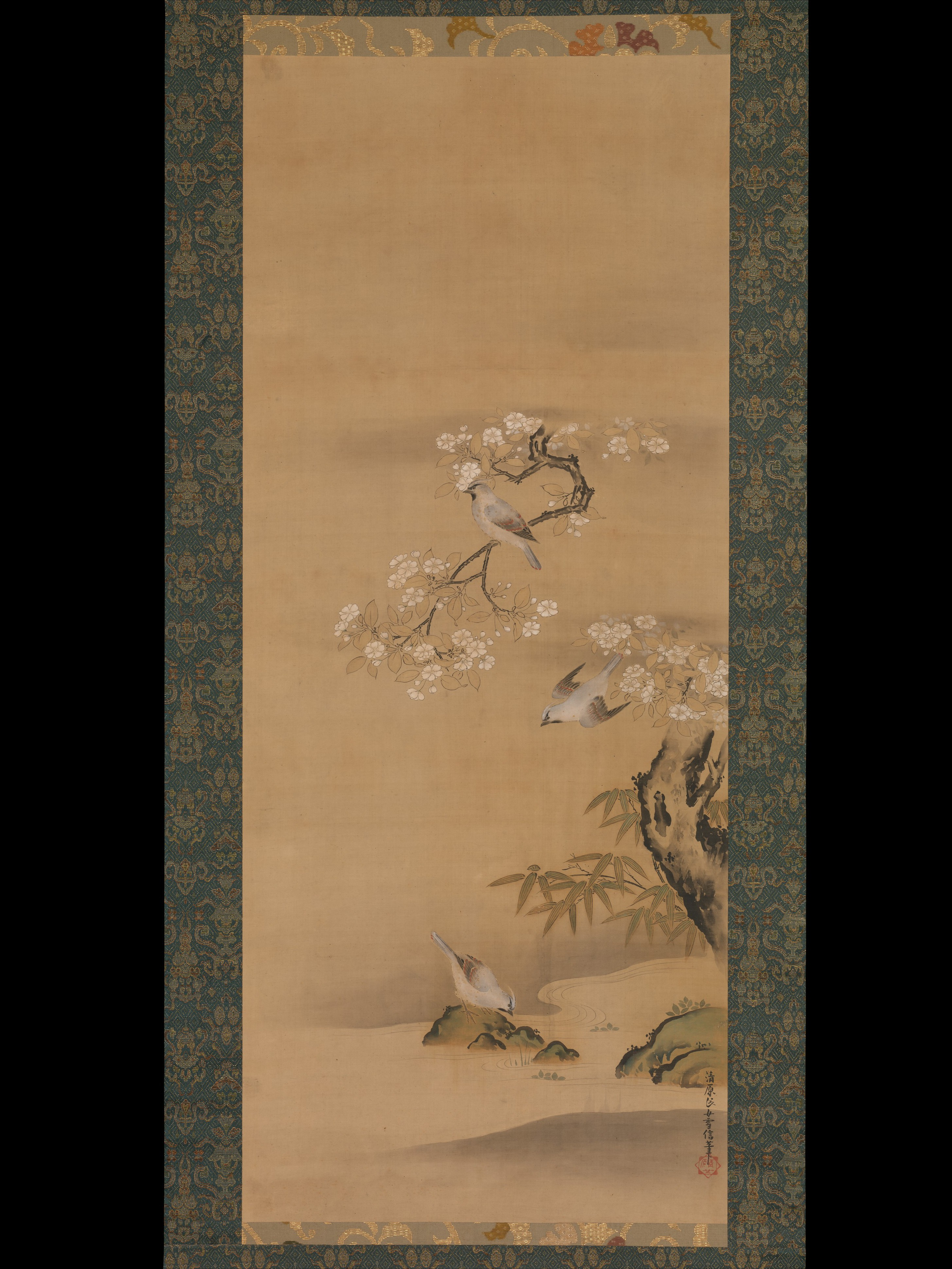
- Artist: Kiyohara Yukinobu
- Year: 17th century
- Location: Metropolitan Museum of Art
- Accession No.: 2012.522.2
- Identifiers: The Met object ID: 77204

Waxwings, Cherry Blossoms, and Bamboo is a 17th century painting / scroll painting by Kiyohara Yukinobu. It is in the collection of the Metropolitan Museum of Art, in New York.

== Description and interpretation ==
This Edo period (1615–1868) hanging scroll painting depicts bird, flower, Bamboo, cherry blossom. Waxwings were a symbol of marital harmony and familial prosperity. The full bloom of the cherry tree indicates late spring.
