= Quail and Millet (Kiyohara Yukinobu) =

Painting by Kiyohara Yukinobu

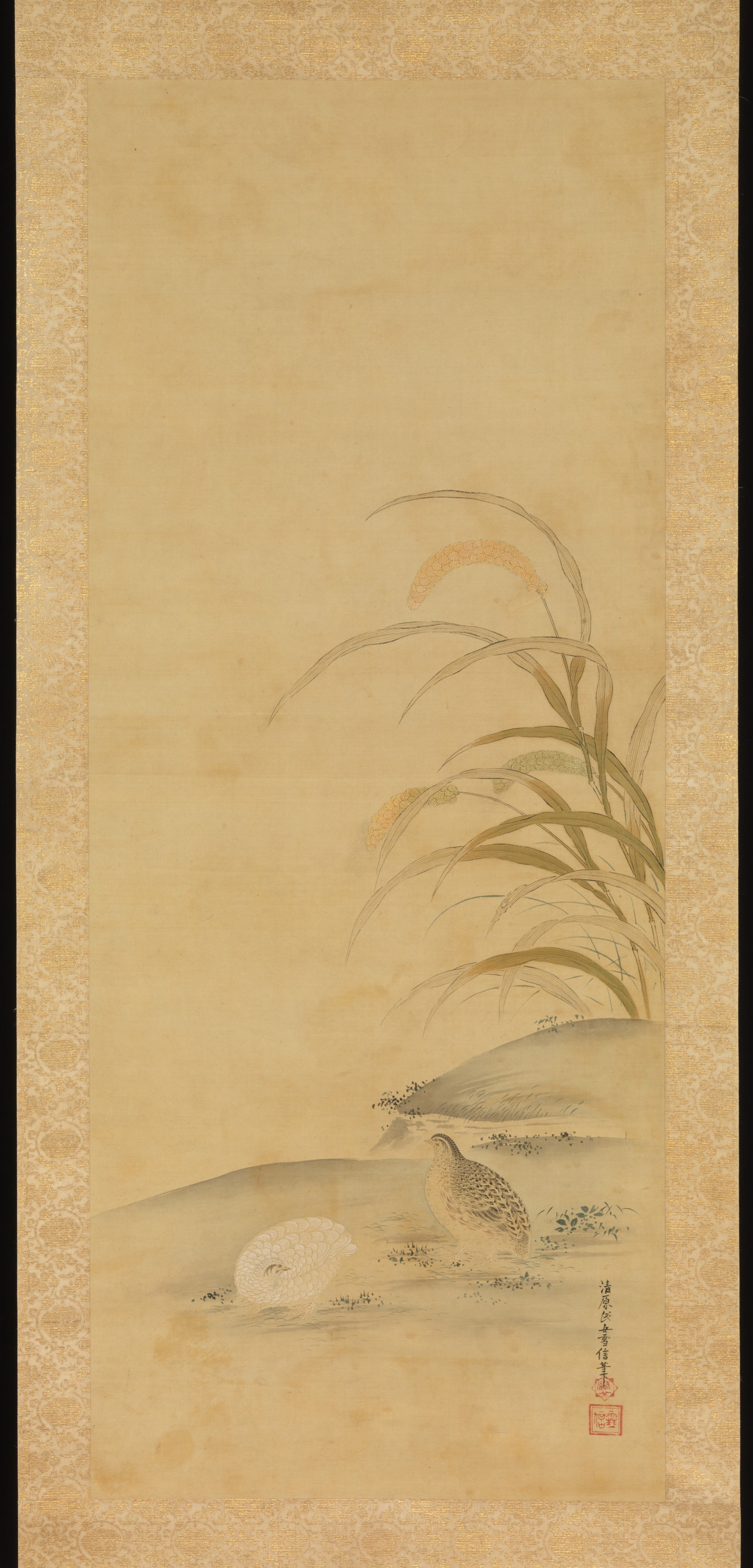
- Artist: Kiyohara Yukinobu
- Year: 17th century
- Dimensions: 118.4 cm (46.6 in) × 47.6 cm (18.7 in)
- Identifiers: The Met object ID: 45734

Quail and Millet (粟に鶉図) is a 17th-century painting on silk by Kiyohara Yukinobu. It is in the collection of the Metropolitan Museum of Art, in New York.

== Description and interpretation ==
This work depicts a tranquil scene of a quail standing beneath stalks of grain. The work recalls twelfth-century Chinese academic painting in its realism and asymmetrical composition. Quail and millet are a symbol of autumn.
