= Emilio Taruffi =

Italian painter

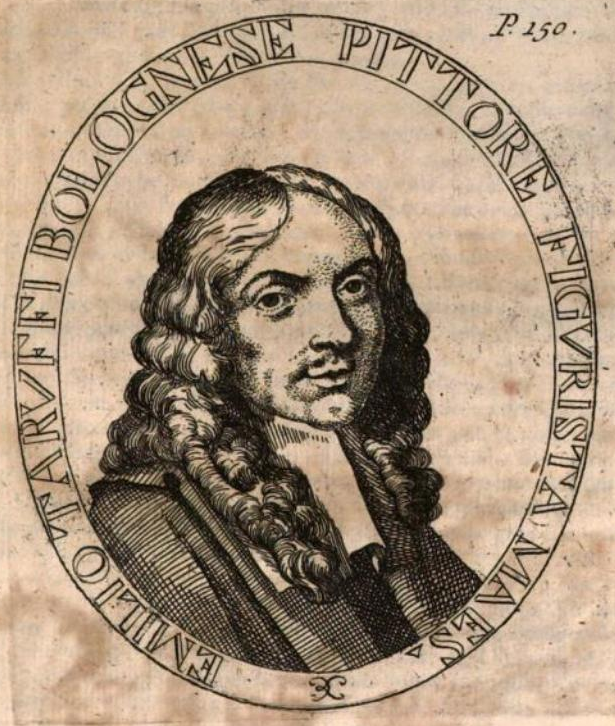
- Emilio Taruffi
- Born: 1633; Bologna, Papal States
- Died: 17 June 1696 (aged 62–63); Bologna, Papal States
- Known for: Painting
- Movement: Baroque

Emilio Taruffi (1633 – 17 June 1696) was an Italian painter of the Baroque period.

== Biography ==
He was a fellow-pupil with Carlo Cignani in the studio of Francesco Albani, then a pupil of the former. Active first at Bologna, in decorating the public hall, and next at Rome, where he resided three years, sometimes employed at Sant'Andrea della Valle and in private houses. He also conducted some altar-pieces, and that of San Pier Celestino, at the church of that name, yields to few of the same period. Maria Elena Panzacchi and Teresa Muratori were some of the pupils to go through his tutelage.

Taruffi was also reputed to be both a successful portrait painter and copyist. His Self-portrait (c. 1689; Florence, Uffizi) was acquired by Cosimo III de' Medici for the Guardaroba in 1689. The Medici also collected other paintings by him, although only a St. Cecilia (Florence, Uffizi) has been identified from the many references to him in the late 17th-century Medici inventories. Crespi cited numerous copies Taruffi made after paintings by Dürer, Lorenzo Garbieri, Guido Cagnacci and Guercino (all untraced). The only confirmed surviving copy by Taruffi is the Virgin and Child Appearing to St. Bruno (oil on copper, 1677; Auckland Art Gallery) after Guercino’s picture of the same subject (1647; Pinacoteca Nazionale di Bologna).

Taruffi died in Bologna on 17 June 1696. He was apparently assassinated.

== Bibliography ==
- Crespi, Luigi (1769). Felsina pittrice: Vite de’ pittori bolognesi. Vol. 3. Rome. pp. 150, 153–4, 236.
- Lanzi, Luigi (1847). History of Painting in Italy; From the Period of the Revival of the Fine Arts to the End of the Eighteenth Century. Vol. III. Translated by Thomas Roscoe. London: Henry G. Bohn. p. 157.
