= Johann Ulrich Kraus =

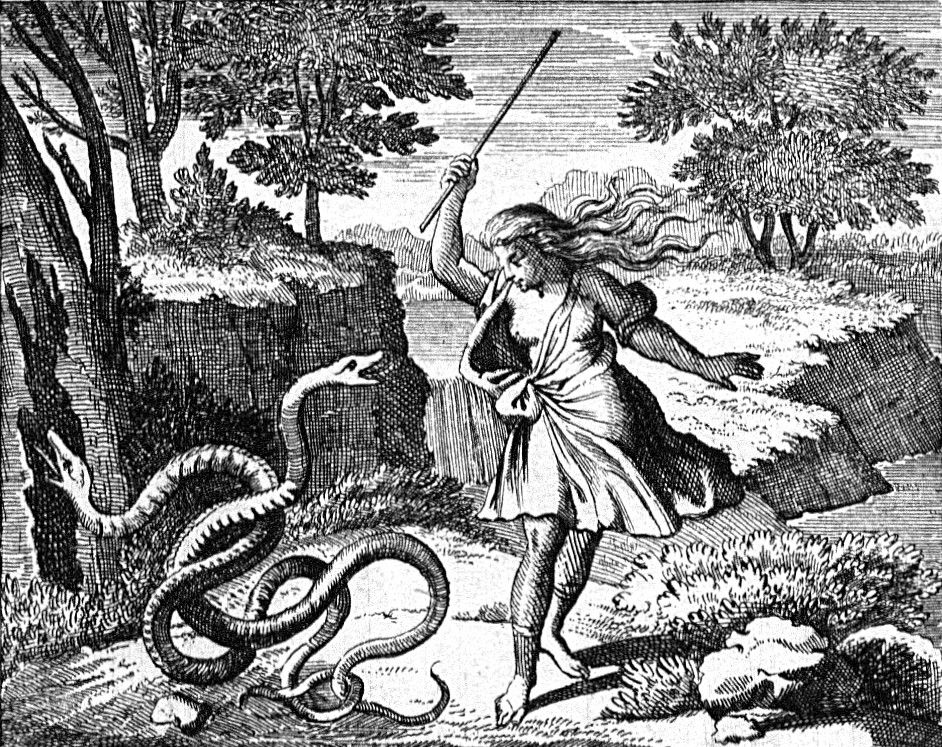
An engraving by Krauss from Die Verwandlungen des Ovidii (The Metamorphoses of Ovid), c. 1690. The Greek prophet Tiresias strikes two snakes with a stick, and is transformed into a woman by the goddess Hera as a punishment

Johann Ulrich Kraus (also Krauss, Krauß, 1655–1719) was an early German illustrator, engraver and publisher in Augsburg.

He was a student of Melchior Küsel (1626- ca.1683), who was in turn a student of Matthäus Merian the Elder. Kraus became a partner in the Augsburg publishing company of Melchior Küsel, whose daughter Johanna Sibylla he married in 1685. Kraus became one of the most successful and respected illustrators of his generation in Augsburg. Among other works, he did engravings for the Churbaierische Atlas. His business was damaged in the War of the Spanish Succession, but Kraus seems to have recovered and in 1717 is recorded in the archives of Augsburg as a wealthy citizen.

== Works ==
- ca 1690 Die Verwandlungen des Ovidii in zweyhundert und sechsundzwantzig Kupffern
- 1694 Biblisches Engel- u. Kunst Werck
- 1700 Historische Bilder-Bibel / welche besteht in Fünff Theil
- 1706 Heilige / Augen- und Gemüths-Lust
- 1710 Tapisseries du royjj
