= Lin Yining =

Chinese artist (1655 – c. 1730)

Lin Yining (Chinese: 林以寧; pinyin: Lín Yǐníng; 1655 – c. 1730), courtesy name Yaqing (Chinese: 亞清; pinyin: Yàqīng), was a Chinese poet active during the Qing dynasty. A founding member of the Banana Garden Poetry Club, Lin Yining was also an avid painter and composer.

== Life and career ==
Lin Yining was born in 1655, near the Zhejiang section of the Zhe River. Her father Lin Lun was a jinshi, and her mother introduced her to classical Chinese literature. She was "very talented and could write poetry and prose"; additionally, Lin dabbled in calligraphy and was "especially well-versed in drawing bamboo in ink and wash". She married Qian Zhaoxiu, who worked at the local censorate and was also acquainted with traditional Chinese opera. While they were based in Luoyang, the couple would write each other love poems that were later compiled into an anthology titled Collected Works of Fengxiao Tower. Qian's mother, Gu Zhiqiong, was instrumental in bringing together talented female poets, and at her behest, the "Banana Garden Five" (蕉园五子), comprising Lin, Zhu Rouze, Chai Jingyi, Qian Yunyi, and Xu Can, was formed. The group later became the Banana Garden Seven (蕉园七子) and its roster was changed to include Lin, Qian, Mao Anfang, Feng Youling, Gu Jiji, Zhang Chayun, and Chai Jingyi. Lin penned the preface to Hangzhou poet Liang Ying's Every Fragrant Word that collects Liang's poems on plum blossoms. A lost play titled Wisteria Pass was allegedly written by Lin.

Lin and Qian had two children – a son, Qing, and a daughter, Tao, neither of whom, according to Lin herself, "dared" to take up Chinese literature. It is not known for certain when Lin Yining died, but the Biographical Dictionary of Chinese Women, citing an unspecified source, gives her death year as 1730. According to an entry on Lin Yining in Women Writers of Traditional China, "Lin's poetry is distinguished by its direct and fluent diction, and vivid visual imagery". She is also praised for presenting her "personal interests" in her poetry, and not adhering to the "conventional themes and scenarios derived from literati construction of feminine voices".
