= Zhang Hao (poet) =

Chinese poet and author

- 張昊
- Born: 1644
- Died: 1669
- Occupation: Poet
- Spouse: Hu Daying
- Father: Zhang Buqing

Zhang Hao (Chinese: 張昊, 1644 – 1669), also known by her courtesy name Chayun (Chinese: 㥶暚), was a Chinese Qing dynasty poet and author of fiction. She was a member of the celebrated literary group the Banana Garden Poetry Club in Hangzhou.

Deng Hanyi's Summary of the Poems of the Most Famous Masters of the Whole World (Tianxia mingjia shiguan) summarized Zhang Hao's life: A native of Qiantang, Zhang Hao was the eldest daughter of Zhang Buqing, an impoverished teacher who had passed the provincial imperial examination. In 1663, at the age of nineteen, she married the student and poet Hu Daying. In 1667, her father was in the capital to take the metropolitan examinations when he died. She wrote "Orphan Hill, how can you be so cruel / As to turn into my father's grave?" and reportedly did not leave bed for a year. She herself died at the age of twenty-four or twenty-five, her early death inspiring sympathy and poetic inspiration. While Zhang Hao is traditionally numbered among the Banana Garden poets, Ellen Widmer suggests that she never met or corresponded with them and the Banana Garden poets merely admired her work.

Zhang Hao wrote two books of poetry, Writings Left Behind from Zither Mansion (Qin lou yi gao 䏜㦻怢䧧) and Chants of Rushing through the Courtyard (Qu ting yong 趨庭詠), the latter posthumously published by her husband. The poet and painter Shang Jinglan was so moved by the former book that she provided a preface for Zhang Hao's collected works, Zhang Chayun yishi (張槎雲遺詩). According to Deng Hanyi, Zhang Hao also wrote vernacular fiction, the only 17th century Chinese woman known to have done so. This was two centuries before the publication of the first extant Chinese novel written by a woman in 1877 (Gu Taiqing's Shadows of Dream of the Red Chamber). Of Zhang Hao's work, only a preface, a few letters, and some poetry remain. Her only extant complete work, Writings Left Behind from Zither Mansion, is owned by the Chinese Academy of Social Sciences Library in Beijing.
