= Feng Xian =

- 馮嫺
- Born: 1662
- Died: 1722 (aged 59–60)
- Occupation: Poet, painter
- Spouse(s): Qian Tingmei
- Parent(s): Feng Zhongyu

Feng Xian (1662 – 1722), also known by her courtesy name Youling, was a Chinese Qing dynasty poet and painter. She was a member of the literary group the Banana Garden Poetry Club in Hangzhou.

A native of Qiantang, she was the daughter of Feng Zhongyu, magistrate in Tong'an. She married the poet Qian Tingmei,

Feng Xian joined the second incarnation of the Banana Garden Poetry Club, the Banana Garden Seven. The Banana Garden poets were all from elite families and many had kinship ties; Feng Xian was the niece of fellow member Gu Si. The septet wrote colophons and commentaries included with publications of each other's poetry.

Feng Xian and Qian Tingmei published a joint collection of poetry, Puyuan changhe ji (Poetic correspondence from Pu Garden). Feng Xian wrote two volumes of poetry herself: Heming ji (Harmony) and Xiangling ji (Spirit of the Xiang River). Neither volume is extant. Some of her poems were anthologized in Yun Zhu's Guochao guixiu zhengshi ji (Correct Beginnings: Women's Poetry of Our August Dynasty), Cai Dianqi's Guochao guige shichao, Wu Hao's Guochao Hangjun shiji, and Zhang Yingchang's Qing shi duo (The tocsin-bell of Qing poetry).
