= Banana Garden Poetry Club =

The Banana Garden Poetry Club (Chinese: 蕉園詩社; pinyin: Jiao yuan shi she) was a group of Qing dynasty female poets in late 17th century Hangzhou.

In the 1660s, poet Gu Yurui organized the group for her daughter, Qian Fenglun. The initial group, the Banana Garden Five (Jiao yuan wu zi 蕉园五子), consisted of Qian Fenglun, her sister-in-law Lin Yining, Lin Yining's neighbors Chai Jingyi and her daughter-in-law Zhu Rouze, and Xu Can. After the latter two poets left the group, Lin Yining reorganized it as the Banana Garden Seven (Jiao yuan qi zi 蕉園七子), adding Gu Si, her niece Feng Xian, Zhang Hao, and Mao Ti. Other poets, including Li Shuzhao and Xu Deyin, were associated with the group. Chai Jingyi was recognized as the leader (jijiu) of the group due to her superior literary talents. All of its members were elite women (gui xiu), many with close kinship or other ties. All but one hailed from Qiantang.

At its peak, the club met several times a month to compose poetry together. They also held poetry events aboard boats on West Lake. The club was both a private group of friends and a public-facing literary group that achieved a high degree of fame and admiration at a time when public achievement by women was not encouraged.

They published a group collection of poetry, Heke jiaoyuan wuzi ji. The club members also wrote prefaces, colophons, and commentaries on each other's works, as well as on the works of writers outside the group. Lin Yining, Feng Xian, and Gu Si contributed to Wu Wushan's Three Wives' Commentary on the Peony Pavilion (Wu Wushan sanfu heping Mudan ting huanhun ji, 1694), commenting on the play The Peony Pavilion by Tang Xianzu, a work that was held in particularly high esteem by women during the 17th century.
