= Francesco Duramano =

18th Century Italian painter

Francesco Duramano (18th century) was an Italian painter known for floral still lifes. He was born in Venice, and active there and in Brescia.

Duramano learned to paint from his mother, a painter of flowers. He became a prominent decorative painter.

The art historian Luigi Salerno, says that Francesco, or his contemporary Carlo Henrici, could be the painter he identifies as pseudo-Guardi or the Maestro di Fiori Guardeschi. For an example of such a painting would be the Roses, Peonies, and Tulips sold by Christies in 2006. Other painters in this style or orbit include Margherita Caffi and Elisabetta Marchioni.

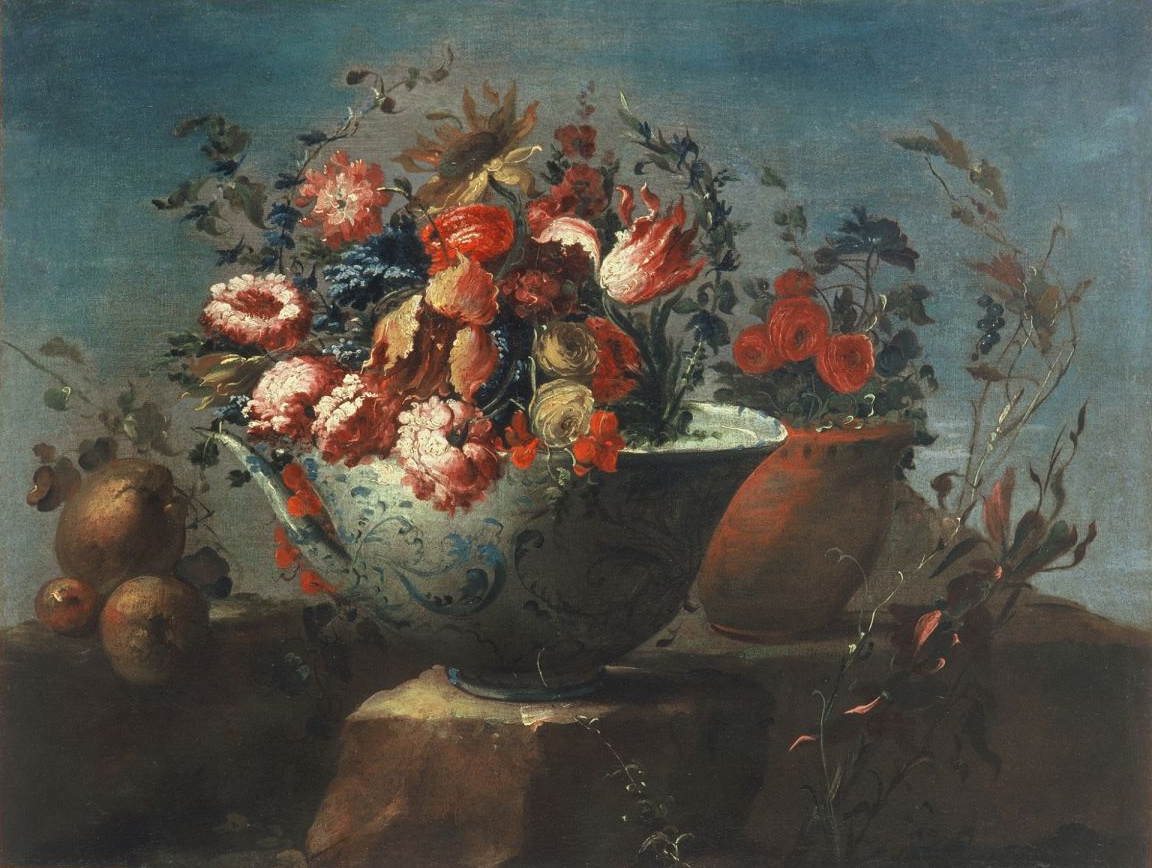
Example of a Pseudo-Guardi work
