= Elisabetta Marchioni =

Italian painter

- Known for: Painting
- Style: Still life
- Movement: Venetian school

Elisabetta Marchioni (also spelled Marchionni) (flourished ca. 1700) was a Venetian painter. She specialized in still life paintings of flowers. She worked in Rovigo.

There are a number of unsigned paintings depicting "still lives with flowers", previously attributed to Francesco Guardi, known as Pseudo-Guradi Maestro di Fiori Guardeschi, but now postulated as likely the work of either Francesco Duramano, Carlo Henrici, Margherita Caffi, and/or Elisabetta.

== Gallery ==
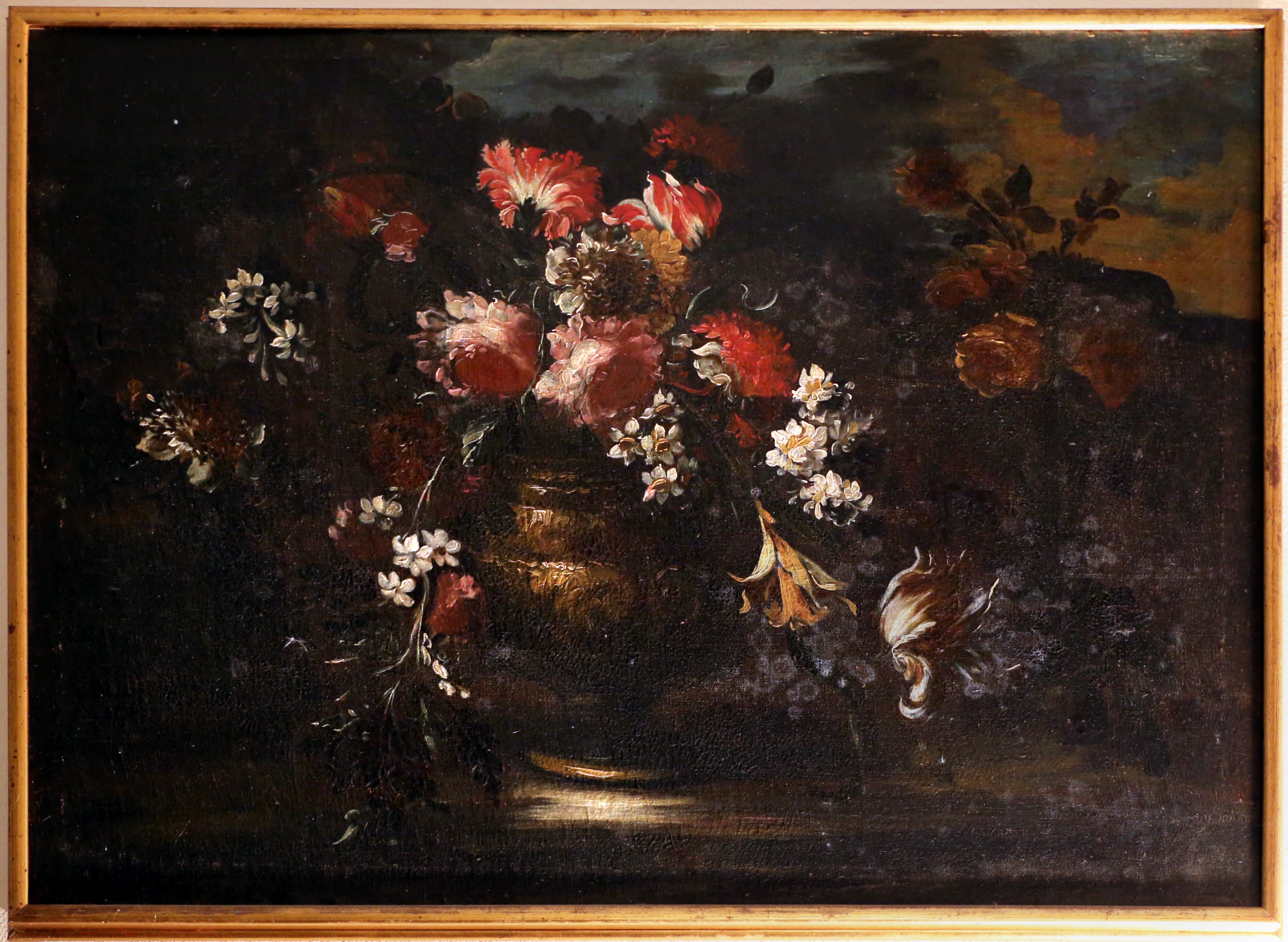
St. Francis of Assisi Church

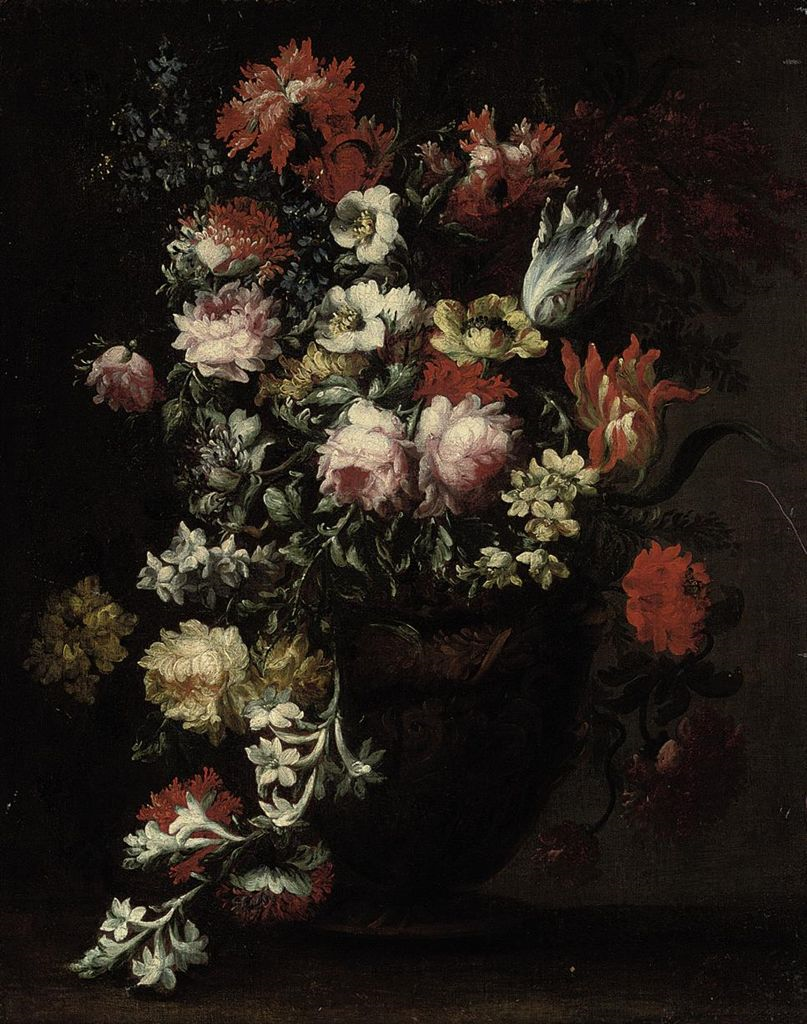
Vase of Flowers, 1700s
