= Yasuhira Kiyohara =

Imperial Japanese Army officer (1914–2001)

- 清原 康平
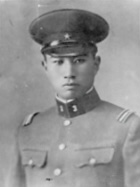
- Born: January 14, 1914; Uki, Kumamoto, Japan
- Died: April 7, 2001 (aged 87); Japan
- Military career
- Allegiance: Empire of Japan
- Branch: Imperial Japanese Army
- Service years: 1935–1936
- Rank: Second Lieutenant
- Units: 3rd Company, 3rd Infantry Regiment
- Conflicts: February 26 incident
- Other work: Author of Konpaku

Yasuhira Kiyohara (清原 康平, Kiyohara Yasuhira; January 14, 1914 – April 7, 2001; married name Yasuhira Yukawa) was a second lieutenant in the Imperial Japanese Army who was sentenced to life imprisonment for directing a mob in the February 26 incident of 1936. He was assigned to the 3rd Company, 3rd Infantry Regiment. He was granted amnesty in December 1941.

After amnesty, he became the president of an airplane company. After World War II, he was engaged in various enterprises related to Korea since he was acquainted with Korean President Park Chung-hee.

== Biography ==
Yasuhira Kiyohara was born in Kumamoto Prefecture in 1914.

The February 26 incident was an attempted coup d'état in Japan, from February 26 to 29, 1936, carried out by 1,483 troops of the Imperial Japanese Army who believed that those around Emperor Hirohito were morally corrupt. Several leading politicians were killed, and the center of Tokyo was briefly occupied by the rebelling troops. The coup, however, was a failure. Following the coup's failure, Kiyohara was court-martialed for mutiny and sentenced to life imprisonment. He was released under an amnesty in December 1941.

In Seicho Matsumoto's Showa Shi Hakkutsu 『昭和史発掘』, Matsumoto cited what Yasuhira Kiyohara later revealed in 1986. Kiyohara stated that he led his group of soldiers to the front of the Imperial Palace without any machine guns or weapons. Matsumoto believes that they were immature and misunderstood Emperor Hirohito. Kiyohara said in a round-table discussion that "it was our program that we enter the Palace with the permission of Emperor Hirohito through Military Officer General to his Majesty Honjo. However, Emperor Hirohito was very furious at our coup d'état."

Kiyohara also wrote a book titled Konpaku in which he describes the coup and Chizuko Mifune, a younger sister of his mother.
