= Fu Daokun =

Chinese artist (fl. 1626)

Fu Daokun (Chinese: 傅道坤; fl. 1626), was a Chinese painter during the Ming Dynasty. She was famed foremost for her skill as a copyist and her technique in Chinese Painting. She was, together with Fan Daokun, one of only two female artists to be recognized by her contemporaries as elite artists.

She was married to the scholar Fan Taixue in Shaoxing and acquainted with the art critic Fan Yunlin, who referred to her as an excellent painter "strong in landscape." She was famous in her era, and one of her scrolls was included in the catalogue Combined Record of Sightings of Calligraphy and Paintings (Gudai shuhua guomu huikao), but she only ever agreed to paint for her relatives.
