= Johanna Sibylla Küsel =

German artist (1650–1717)

Johanna Sibylla Kraus
- Born: Johanna Sibylla Küsel; 1650; Augsburg
- Died: 1717 (aged 66–67)

Johanna Sibylla Kraus (née Küsel; 1650–1717) was a German printmaker from Augsburg.

Kraus was born in Augsburg as the daughter of Melchior Küsel. She was taught by her father and assisted his pupil Johann Ulrich Kraus, whom she married and continued to work with.

== Gallery ==
Four designs of tapestries after Charles Le Brun, copied from engravings by Sebastien Le Clerc:

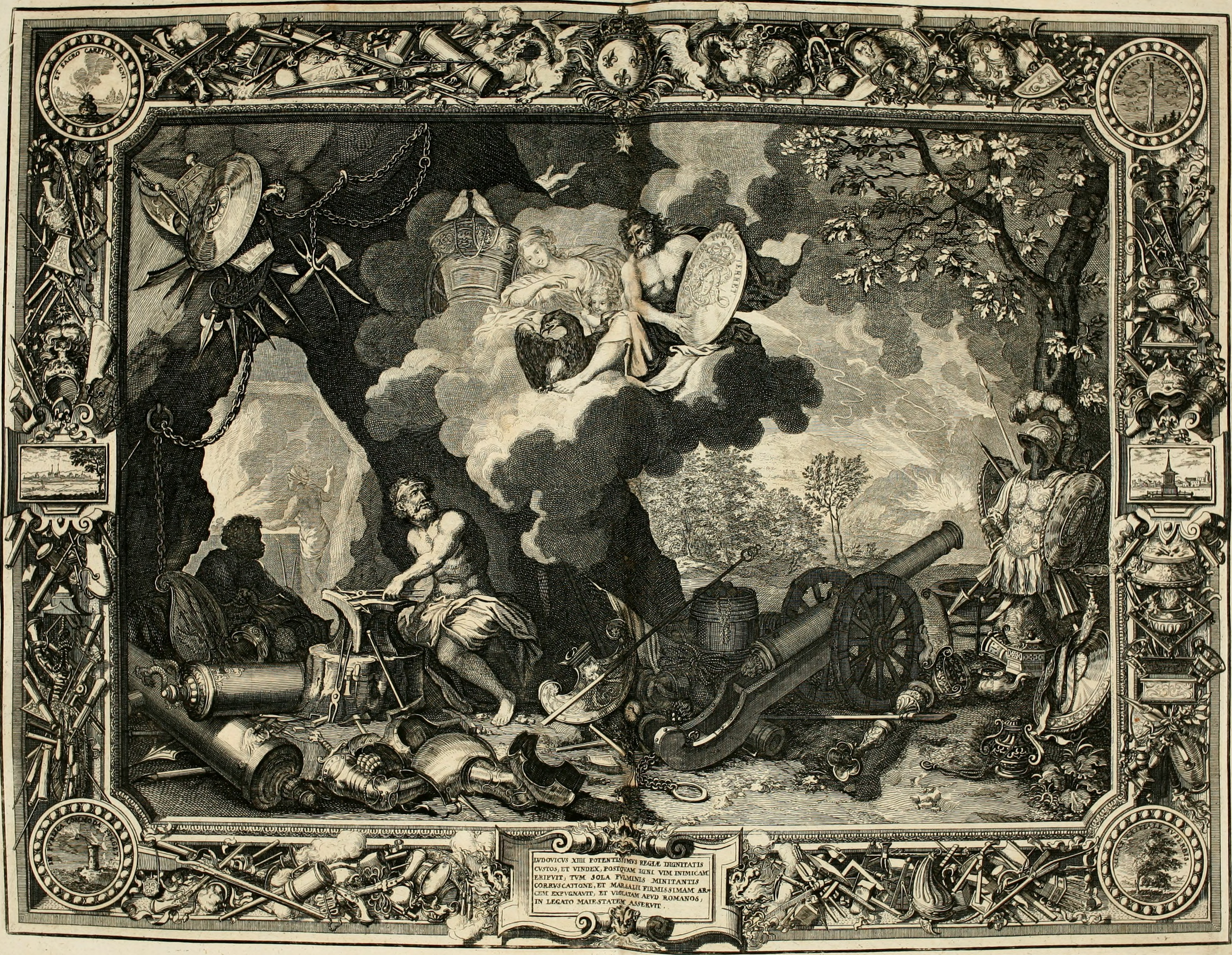
Fire

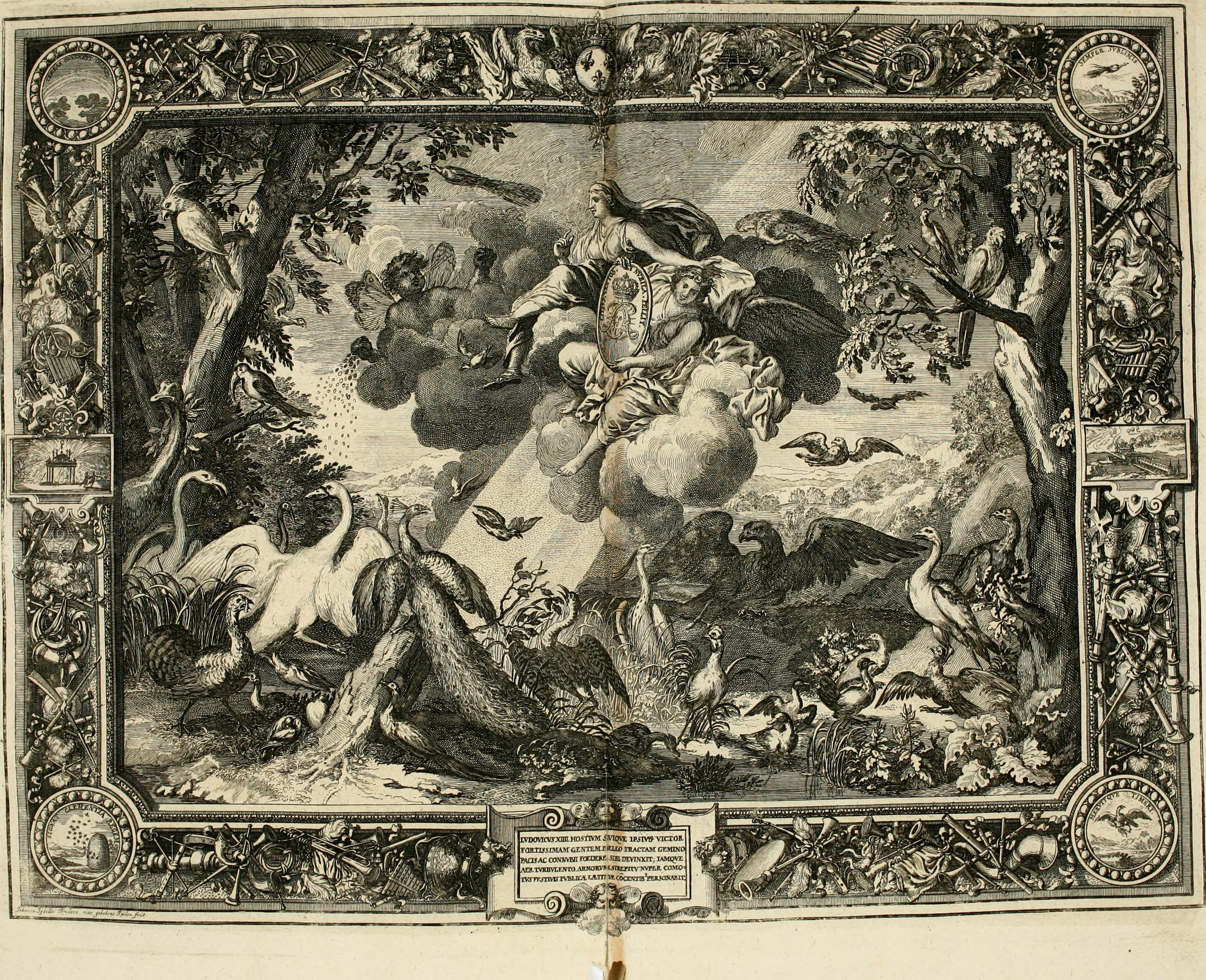
Air

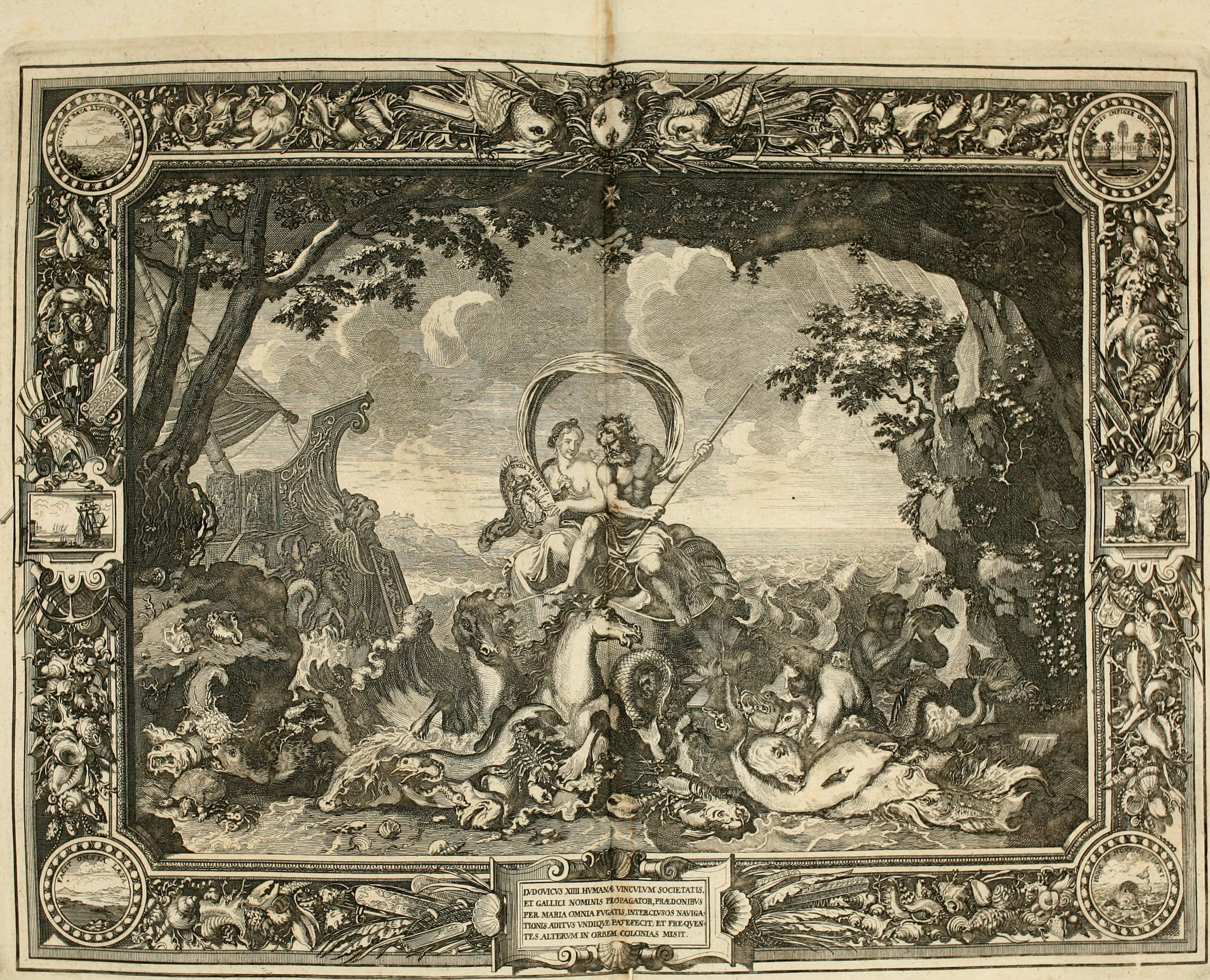
Water

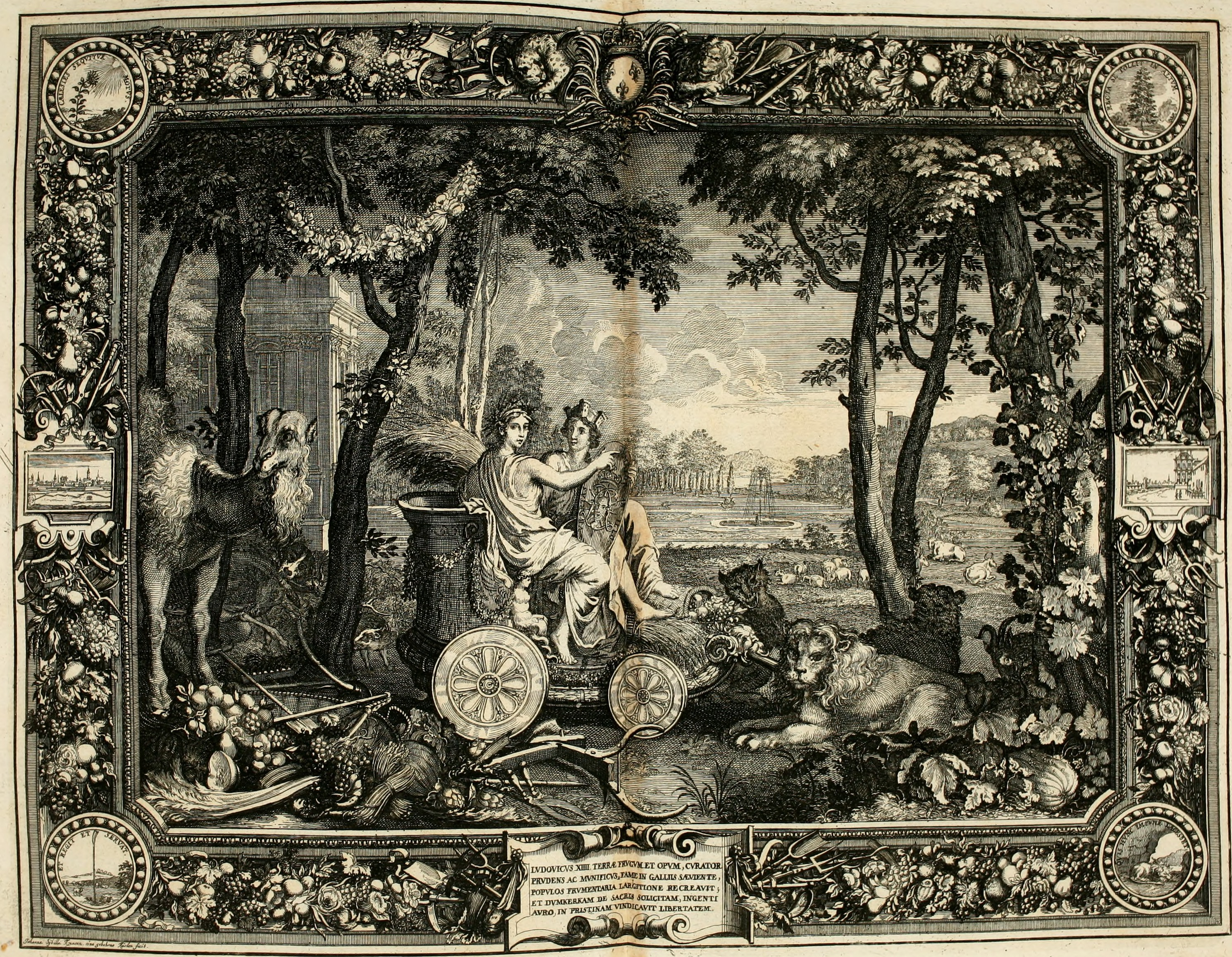
Earth
