= Plautilla Bricci =

Italian architect, artist (1616–1690)

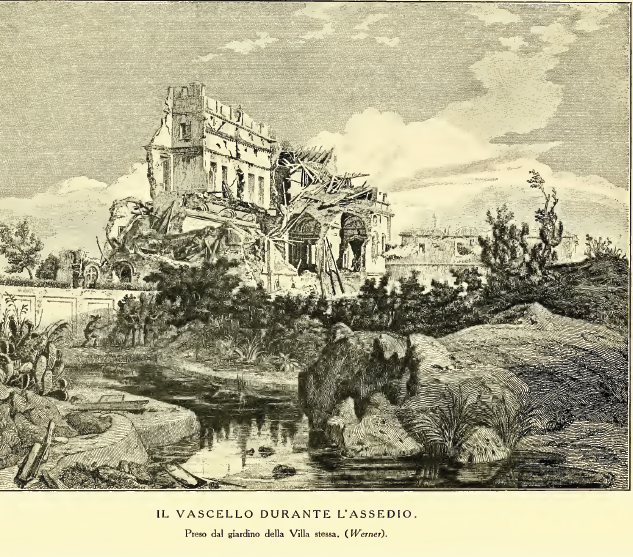
Villa il Vascello (also known as Villa Benedetti) sketched in its ruins.

Plautilla Bricci (Italian pronunciation: [plauˈtilla ˈbrittʃi]; or Plautilla Brizio; 1616-1705) was a 17th-century Roman architect, painter, and sculptor; she was the only female architect of her day. Her most famous work is the Villa Benedetti (Villa il Vascello) near the Porta San Pancrazio, Rome. She also designed the third chapel on the left aisle in the Church of San Luigi dei Francesi, Rome, dedicated to St. Louis, having also painted the altarpiece in this chapel.

== Family ==
Plautilla Bricci is recorded in the Parrochia di San Lorenzo-in-Lucina, Libro di Baptesimo (Parish of San Lorenzo-in-Lucina, Book of Baptism) to have been born to Giovanni Bricci and Chiara Recupita. Also recorded were Plautilla's seven siblings, however only three including Plautilla, made it to full adulthood. Born in 1611, her older sister Albina Bricci is said to have married a painter of the time. Born in 1621, her younger brother Basilio Bricci is said to have become a painter and architect. Later in their careers, Basilio and Plautilla often worked together on commissions.

== Childhood and artistic training ==
Plautilla's father Giovanni was an artist and musician who trained her; he had a shop near the Church of Santa Maria del Popolo. She also received training from her father's friend, Cavalier d’Arpino. She also trained with Maria Eufrasia della Croce who she later collaborated with on a painting of the Nativity for the convent at San-Giuseppe a Capo alle Case. Her earliest painting is a miraculous Virgin and Child made in the early 1630s, which was given to the Church of Santa Maria in Monte Santo, Rome. It is not known how she became an architect, but she may have received instruction in the orbit of Cassiano dal Pozzo who championed women artists and had an interest in architectural training.

== Career ==
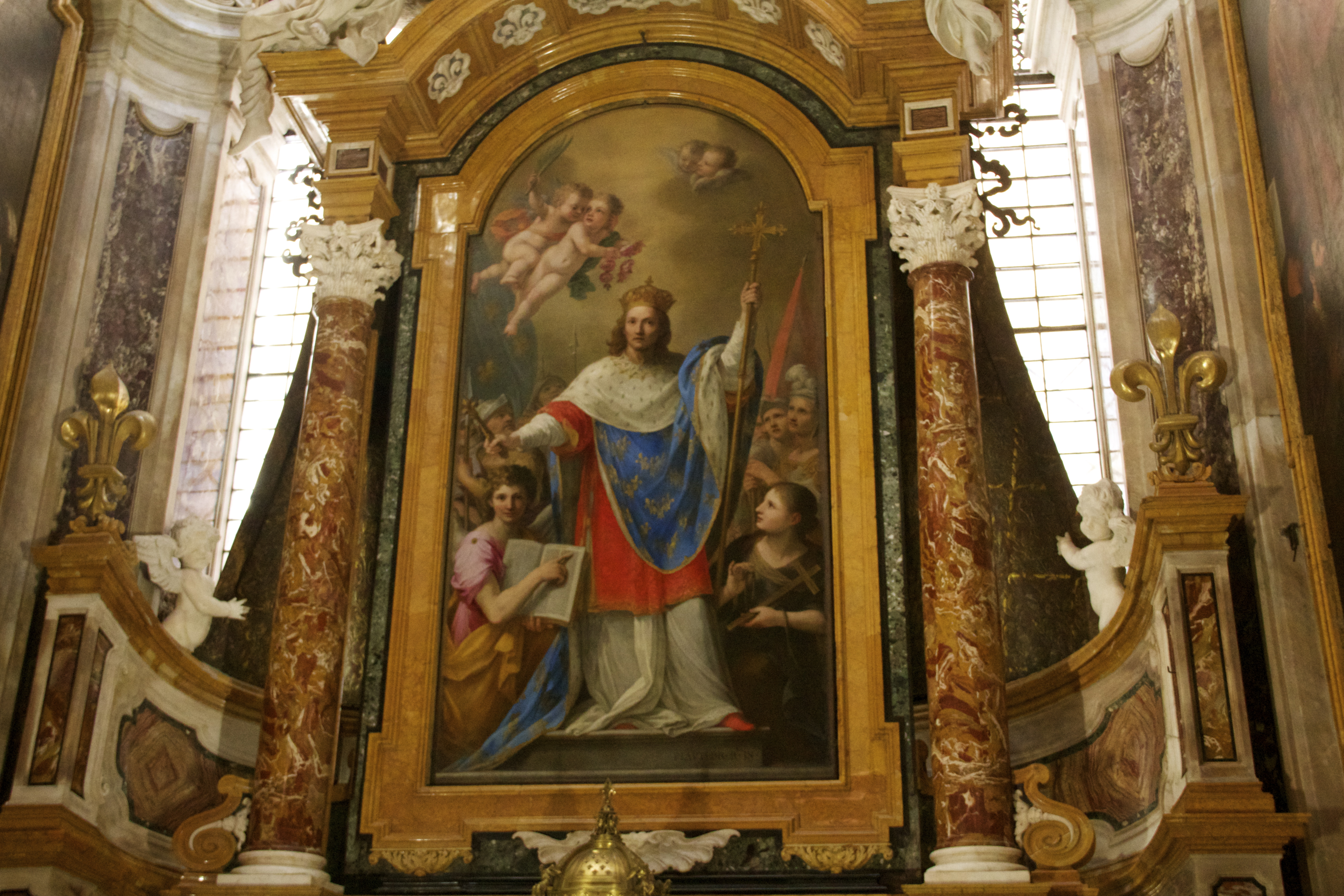
Chapel of San Luigi, Church of San Luigi dei Francesi, Rome

In 1631, she painted Joseph and Potiphar's Wife (sold, London, 1991). In 1644, Plautilla made two paintings: a Saint Francis and an Angel and a Floral still-life for Cardinal Francesco Barberini, the Pope's nephew. She also painted two doors for Giacomo Albano Ghibbesio in the same year. She painted a cabinet for Antonio degli Effetti (now lost). She attended the Accademia di San Luca between 1655 and 1671. In 1660, she painted the altarpiece of The Birth of the Virgin for the Church of Santa Maria in Campo Marzio, Rome. In 1661, she designed the ephemeral funeral structures for the tomb of Cardinal Mazarin; Mazarin's secretary was Elpidio Benedetti, brother of artist Maria Eufrasia della Croce. Two particularly proficient drawings survive from this project.

Between 1663 and 1668, Plautilla designed and oversaw the construction of Villa Benedetti for Elpidio, known as Villa il Vascello (now largely destroyed). Elpidio may have hired Plautilla because he wanted to construct a villa like nothing else in Rome. Plautilla was assisted by her brother, Basilio. The architecture was unusual, comprising loggias, curved walls and elaborate stucco. Plautilla painted designs inside the villa, an allegory of Felicitas Publica in the gallery, and an altarpiece of the Assumption of the Virgin for the chapel, alongside Pietro da Cortona, Francesco Allegrini and Giovanni Francesco Grimaldi. The villa was nicknamed Villa il Vascello because it resembled a ship. The plan was changed several times, including when Elpidio visited France in 1664 and was influenced by French architecture. He asked Gian Lorenzo Bernini to modify Bricci's plan in 1664.

Between 1670 and 1680, Plautilla designed and oversaw the construction of the Chapel of San Luigi, in the Church of San Luigi dei Francesi, Rome, as well as painting the altarpiece for the Chapel and carving reliefs and sculpture. In 1675, she painted a lunette of the Presentation of the Sacred Heart of Jesus for the Basilica of St John Lateran. She also painted two frescoes of Saint Dominique and Saint Francis for the Lateran (now destroyed). In 1675, she made a processional standard with Saint John the Baptist for the village of Poggio Mirteto. She also designed a stucco bas-relief for the local Collegiate. In 1686, she showed a painting at the art show of San Salvatore in Lauro.

== Later life and death ==
At least one source suggests that she may have had a long-term relationship with Maria-Eufradia Benedetti earlier in her life, who was a female painter of the time, but it is not made clear if it was romantic or friendly in nature. In 1677, Plautilla moved with her brother to a house given to her by Elpidio Benedetti. When her brother died in 1692, she moved to the monastery of Santa Margherita in Trastevere where she died in 1705. She is buried next to her brother in Santa Maria in Trastevere. She never married.

== Legacy ==
Filippo Baldinucci praised her skills in his biography of contemporary artists. Antonio degli Effetti described his cabinet in the Studiolo di pittura nella Galleria della Ricchezza, and it also features in Giovanni Pietro Bellori's Nota delli Musei. Elpidio described the design of his villa in the book Villa benedetta discritta published in 1677 under the pseudonym of Matteo Mayer. In this book he claimed that Basilio designed it, but the building contract and drawings show Plautilla was the lead architect. In November 2021 to April 2022, an exhibition opened at the Gallery of Palazzo Corsini in Rome. The curator, Yuri Primarosa, depicts Plautilla's life and work. Sketches, paintings, and photographs of the Roman artist's work are displayed alongside published articles produced by Primarosa.
