= Sister Luisa Capomazza =

Italian painter

Sister Luisa Capomazza (c. 1600 – 1646, Naples) was an Italian painter of religious subjects and landscapes. Though her career and work has been documented by Bernardo de Dominici, there is a lack of identified paintings attributed to her. She is described by de Dominici as having “nobly enjoyed herself with painting, with which she was exceedingly in love.”

== Early life and education ==
Luisa Capomazza was well educated. Though she did not come from a family of artists, her education likely included instruction in drawing. Her talent was realized when she copied a figure of St. John the Baptist in charcoal. She may have learned painting from Mariangiola Criscuolo or from Pompeo Landulfo, though de Dominici suspects that she was a student of Giovanni Antonio Santoro. She continued to improve her painting and created several sacred images before she was twenty years old.

According to de Dominici, her beauty attracted several marriage proposals which she refused. He wrote that she was only dedicated to painting, and was unconcerned with her appearance as well as issues of marriage. Thus, she took religious vows with her father's approval.

== Religious life and art ==
Though Sister Luisa Capomazza took her vows, she was not a member of a cloistered order. According to her biographer, her aim of becoming a nun was prompted more by her desire for freedom than by a religious calling. She began by painting in “a very sweet style” and many of her images were for private patrons. She also painted altarpieces for the churches of Santa Chiara and Gesù e Maria in Naples. De Dominici describes one of her paintings as “the Virgin with the Christ-child at her breast, seated in a rich chair above the clouds, surrounded by a multitude of angels, and below there are the Cardinals St. Charles Borromeo and St. Bonaventure, who kneel adoring the celestial vision.” Her other painting of St. Francis receiving the stigmata was signed by her and dated 1621.

Capomazza was also commissioned to paint landscapes, which de Dominici praised. According to Julia Dabbs, Capomazza was one of the first modern women to have addressed this subject matter. It is important to understand that observation would have been difficult in her position, as her movement would have been restricted as a nun. However, it is unknown where she learned to paint landscapes. Though de Dominici praises her landscapes, he is critical of her other work for lacking the skill to represent the human figure accurately.

== Later life and death ==
According to de Dominici, Sister Luisa Capomazza improved her painting with study and practice. Some of her work was moved to other places, such as sacristies and monasteries. When she was middle aged, she fell ill and found it difficult to paint. She died in 1646 and left her possessions to her niece.

== Bibliography ==
- Gaze, Delia, edited. Dictionary of Women Artists. vol. 1. London and Chicago: Fitzroy Dearborn Publishers, 1997.
- Dabbs, Julia K. Life Stories of Women Artists, 1550-1800: An Anthology. Surrey, England/ Burlington, VT: Ashgate Publishing, 2009.
- de Dominici, Bernardo. “The Life Story of Sister Luisa Capomazzo.” In Life Stories of Women Artists, 1550-1800: An Anthology, edited by Julia K. Dabbs. 234–238. Surrey, England/ Burlington, VT: Ashgate Publishing, 2009. Originally published in Vite de pittori, scultori ed architetti napoletani vol. 3 (1743; Bologna. 1971).
