= Giuseppe Antonio Taruffi =

Italian poet, diplomat and chess master (1722–1786)

Giuseppe Antonio Taruffi (1722 – 1786) was an Italian poet, diplomat and chess master.

== Biography ==
He was born in Bologna, and studied law in Rome under Giovanni Vincenzo Gravina. He was named to diplomatic missions for the Papal State to Warsaw, Poland (under the nuncio, soon to be Cardinal Visconti) and Vienna, Austria. He is known for his Latin poems collected and published in 1760 in Rome and others in Rime degli Arcadia in 1781. Among his poems in Latin were Montgolfieri machina volans and Carmen elegiacum (1784). In 1770, he wrote a text in French about The Turk, an automaton created by Wolfgang von Kempelen, which he had seen in Vienna and which was supposed to simulate a chess player. In 1786, this work was then published in Italian in Rome. He wrote in 1783 a biographical eulogy of Pietro Metastasio. He served the Cardinal Antonio Eugenio Visconti, and accompanied him to Rome.

== Works ==
- Ad Raymudum Cunichium.
- Elogio accademico del chiarissimo poeta cesareo Pietro Metastasio ...
- Montgolferii machina volans.

== Note ==
- Mainly derived from Italian wikipedia entry.
