= Melchior Küsel =

German engraver (1626–1684)

- Personification of Unity and Strength, engraving from Küsel's Iconographia (1670)
- Born: 17 August 1626; Augsburg, Holy Roman Empire
- Died: 1684 (aged 57–58); Augsburg, Holy Roman Empire
- Education: Matthäus Merian
- Known for: Engraving
- Movement: Baroque

Melchior Küsel (17 August 1626 – 1684) was a German engraver of the Baroque period.

== Life ==
Melchior Küsel was born in Augsburg on 17 August 1626. He was the eldest son of Mathias Küsel (died 1664), the founder of a family of copper engravers. The family was active throughout Central Europe, most notably in Prague, where they worked for the Jesuit printing house. The Küsel family produced a significant body of work during the 17th and 18th centuries, encompassing book illustrations, academic theses, individual portraits, cityscapes (vedute) and devotional prints.

Melchior studied in Frankfurt with Matthäus Merian but returned to Augsburg after Merian’s death in 1650. He later also worked in Vienna and Munich. In Augsburg he had his own publishing house and became known through his 146 etchings after originals by Johann Wilhelm Baur, a collection entitled Iconographia (1670), combining illustrations of the Life of Christ with allegories, Italian landscapes and views of castles and harbours.

In 1657 , with his brother Matthäus, he published the memorial book Cenotaphium piis manibus Ferdinandi III and in 1679 an illustrated Bible. As well as being a prolific engraver, he executed such drawings as Peasants in a Tavern (1653; Augsburg, Schaezlerpalais) in black ink with grey wash, and Providentia (Staatsgalerie Stuttgart) in red pencil. Melchior's younger brother, Mathias Küsel (1629–1681), and his daughter Johanna Sibylla were also engravers. Johanna Sibylla married the German engraver Johann Ulrich Kraus.
