= Marie Blancour =

French painter

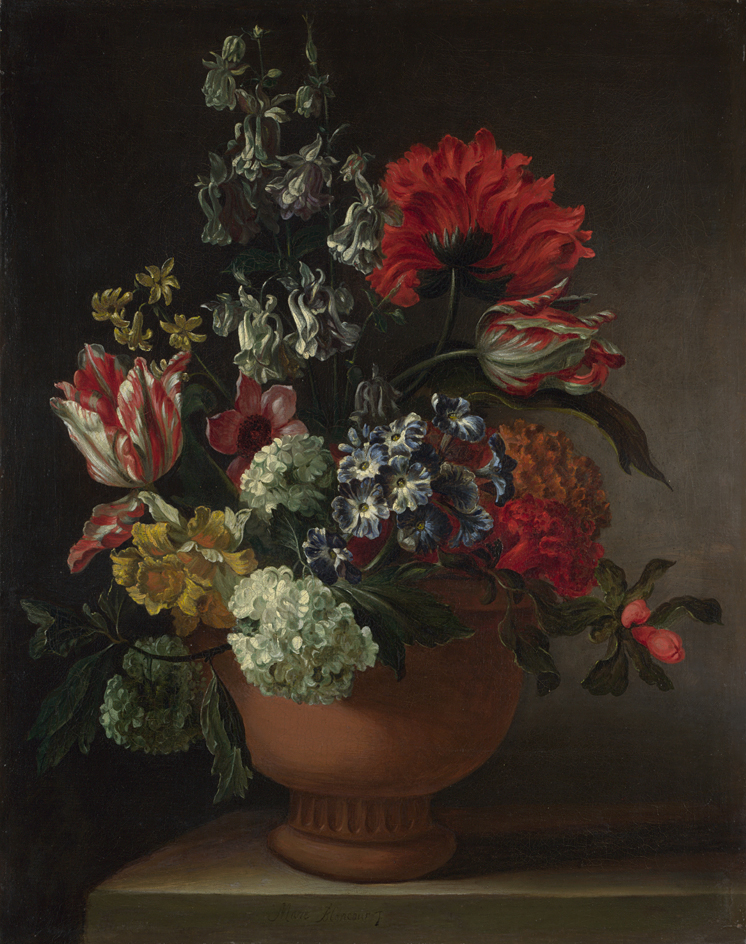
Flowers in a terracotta vase, collection National Gallery, London

Marie Blancour (active 1650 – 1699) was a French painter.

She is known for only one signed work, a vase of flowers, that today is in the collection of the National Gallery, London. The art historian Sam Segal documented some notes about her work, but so far nothing else is known.
