= Apollonia van Veen =

Dutch artist (died 1635)

Apollonia van Veen (died 1635) was a Dutch pastellist.

Possibly born in the Hague, van Veen was the daughter of painter Pieter van Veen. Her brothers Symon and Jacobus were pastellists as well; all three were known to be portraitists. She died in Goes.
