= Maria Eufrasia della Croce =

Italian painter

Maria Eufrasia della Croce (1597–1676) was a Carmelite nun and artist. She was born as Flavia Benedetti in Rome; she entered Carmel in 1628 and painted many works for her Roman convent of S. Giuseppe a Capo le Case of the Discalced Carmelites. Her father was a Roman patrician and she had three brothers, one a Capuchin friar, and one, the abbott Elpidio, secretary to Cardinal Mazarin, who also collected art and was an amateur architect.

Maria entered the convent on 3 May 1627 and became a nun a year later. She may have received some artistic training as a child; her work bears some similarity to the colouring of the Bolognese group of artists and she had links with the miniaturist Anna Angelica Allegrini and the architect Plautilla Bricci. She may have helped to train Plautilla, who stayed with her for a sustained period; her brother Elpidio went on to commission Plautilla to design his villa.

At some point, Maria became the Prioress of the convent. She painted an altarpiece of the Nativity with Plautilla's help for the Church of S. Giuseppe, now destroyed. She is also recorded as having painted two other altarpieces in the Church, a Virgin and Child with Saint Catherine and a small Virgin and Child with John the Baptist and Saint Andrew. She also painted several frescoes in the cloistered part of the convent. She painted a framed Virgin Mary of the Rosary owned by her brother Elpidio.

Maria's paintings were mentioned in the guidebook written by Filippo Titi. Inside the convent, surviving mural paintings include God the Father, an Annunciation, the repentant Mary Magdalene and Christ with the woman from Samaria around the communion window; Mary Magdalene, the Virgin Mary and Saint John in an illusionistic architectural frame designed to surround a sculpted Crucifix; and two Carmelite saints flanking a cross with symbols of Christ's Resurrection and the nourishing blood of Christ bathing two nude figures, which is similar to contemporary devotional prints. Destroyed mural paintings include a Last Supper, the ecstasy of Saint Teresa; Christ and the woman from Samaria and a Noli me Tangere. There is also a surviving canvas depicting Saint Teresa protecting Carmelite nuns attributed to Maria, also similar to print imagery. For her mural paintings, Maria used oil on plaster, an easier technique than true fresco. The stories of the repentant Mary Magdalene and the woman from Samaria were significant to Saint Teresa, as was the image of Christ's nourishing blood.
