= Caterina Angela Pierozzi =

Italian painter

Caterina Angela Pierozzi (c. 1670 – 1690) was an Italian painter active in Florence in the final quarter of the 17th century, documented as working for the Medici Grand Duchess Vittoria della Rovere, who was well-known for her patronage of female artists. Specialising in miniatures, she was one of only two female artists to be admitted to the Accademia e compagnia delle arti del disegno prior to the 18th century. As it stands, there is only one known extant work by her, a signed and dated miniature on vellum depicting the Annunciation.

== Life and career ==
Though biographical information for Caterina Angela Pierozzi remains limited at present, some elements of her career and her position within the Florentine art world can be reconstructed through contemporary documents. The principal source is a passage in Notizie de' professori del disegno da Cimabue in qua, a biographical dictionary of Florentine artists compiled by Filippo Baldinucci. Pierozzi is mentioned by Baldinucci in the chapter on Ventura Salimbeni in the context of her uncle, the painter Fra Manetto Pierozzi:

'Caterina Angela Pierozzi, niece of said Fra Manetto, who having learned from her uncle the art of miniature, with praise she practises in it, and we have from her hand in the chambers of the serenissimo palace a painting of circa 2 braccia, in which is represented the Blessed Virgin in the act of sitting, there are St. Joseph, and St. Ann, and the baby Jesus, and a little St. John, who, with beautiful grace, and extraordinary naturalness, pressed on his chest his little apron, in which he holds tightly wrapped two kittens, almost as if he wanted to defend them from a little dog, which with a beautiful gesture seems to want to cause them harm, and so realistic are the gestures of the young boy and of the little dog, that more could not be desired'

It is also known that a small picture on vellum by Pierozzi hung in the Medici Grand Ducal Villa Poggio Imperiale, as an inventory of 1692 lists a miniature on cartapecora as adorning the wall of a small room just outside the ground floor apartment of Vittoria delle Rovere. The miniature depicts a portrait of a woman, who holds a small image of the Annunciation in her right hand, covered with crystal and adorned with a floral frame. Other than the portrait, this artwork must have been very close in nature to the Annunciation miniature. In the inventory, Pierozzi 'is identified by both an inscription on the back of the image and her relationship to her husband Michele Corsi disegnatore, who received payments from the Grand Duchess on several occasions for designs for various miniatures and embroidery, including one of an Annunciation with a garland of flowers.

The final certainty we have for Pierozzi's life is that she was elected to the Academia del Disegno in 1684. This is an important piece of information, since the only other female painter to be elected to the Academy over the course of the entire 17th century was Artemisia Gentileschi, in 1616. In fact, Gentileschi and Pierozzi were respectively the first and second female painters to be elected to the Academy ever. Critically, this might indicate Pierozzi's acceptance and status as an artist amongst her male contemporaries.

=== The Annunciation ===
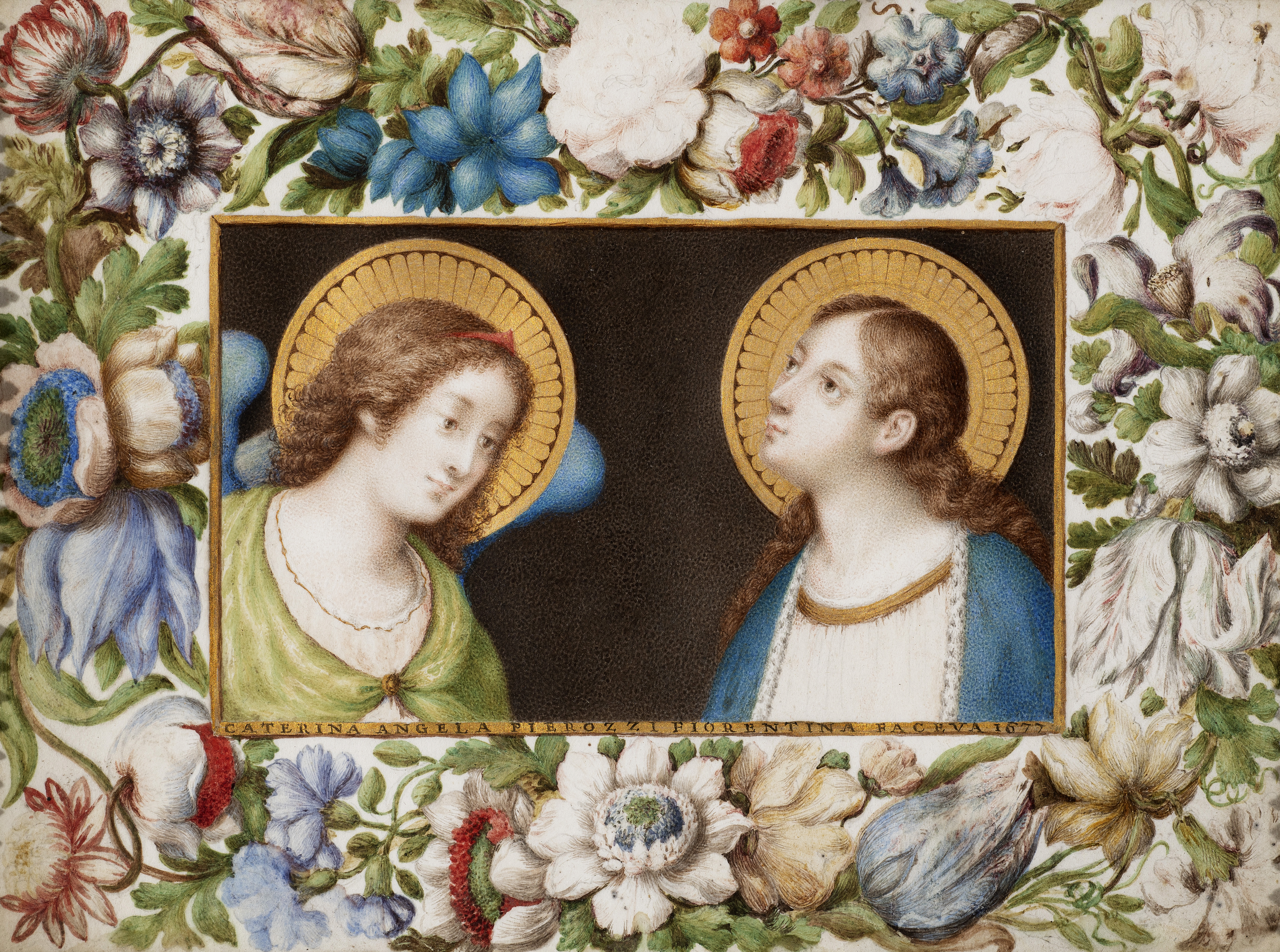
The Annunciation Miniature on vellum, by Caterina Angela Pierozzi

This miniature on vellum, depicting the Annunciation surrounded by a border of minutely rendered flowers, which include roses, tulips and lilies, is the only known extant work by Pierozzi and has been signed 'CATERINA ANGELA PIEROZZI FIORENTINA FACEVA 1677'.

The composition derives from the affresco miraculoso, known as the Nunziata, in the Basilica della Santissima Annunziata in Florence, venerated within Florence for the miraculous intervention which allowed it to be completed. By 1677, the date of Pierozzi's miniature, the Medici family had long been custodians of the miraculous fresco, severely restricting its access. The Medici Grand Dukes sought to identify their own sacrality with that of the Nunziata, and in 1580 Ferdinand I engaged Alessandro Allori to restore the fresco, as well as to copy the image in order to gift it to Cardinal Borromeo. From then on, and well into the 17th century, copies of the Nunziata were widely circulated and commissioned by the Medici family. Indeed, fourteen copies are documented by Alessandro Allori and around twenty by Cristofano Allori (fig. 3), who 'must have counted this activity as a distinct genre'. Some of the copies were for the Medici themselves, such as, for example, the three small copies by Cristofano Allori which were sent to Marie de Medici in France at the beginning of the 17th century. Many others were given as gifts, with recipients including members of venerable Florentine families, and honoured associates outside of Florence, indicating that the Medici were concerned with sharing their privileged relation to the cult beyond the city.

Given that the Medici restricted access to the Nunziata, appropriated its imagery for their own sacrality and promotion, and commissioned numerous copies after the fresco, it seems reasonable to posit that Pierozzi's miniature is very likely linked to Grand Ducal patronage.

The floral border surrounding the image of the Annunciation also ties in with Medicean interests, namely those of botany and horticulture. The flowers are beautifully rendered, with botanical accuracy, and presumably Pierozzi had these floral specimens in front of her as she created her miniature. The exactitude of the flowers raises the possibility that Pierozzi practised botanical illustrations, an artistic domain much admired by the Medici, who were fascinated by the intersection of the natural sciences and art. Medici patronage of floral still life had reached its apogee by the mid-17th century, with artists such as Carlo Dolci, Bartolomeo Bimb, Andrea Scacciati and, of course, Giovanna Garzoni commissioned to make examples of this genre. Pierozzi's miniature fits in with Medicean botanical interests, further reinforcing the idea of a Grand Ducal commission.

The painting was acquired by the National Gallery of Art in 2023.

== Notes ==
1.For a full list of recipients of the Nunziata image, see B.I.M. Iarocci, pp. 51-53.
