= Margherita Caffi =

Italian artist (1650–1710)

Teresa Margherita Volò Caffi
- Born: Teresa Margherita Volò; 1648; Milan, Duchy of Milan
- Died: 1710 (aged 61–62); Milan, Duchy of Milan
- Known for: Painting
- Movement: Still Life
- Spouse: Ludovico Caffi

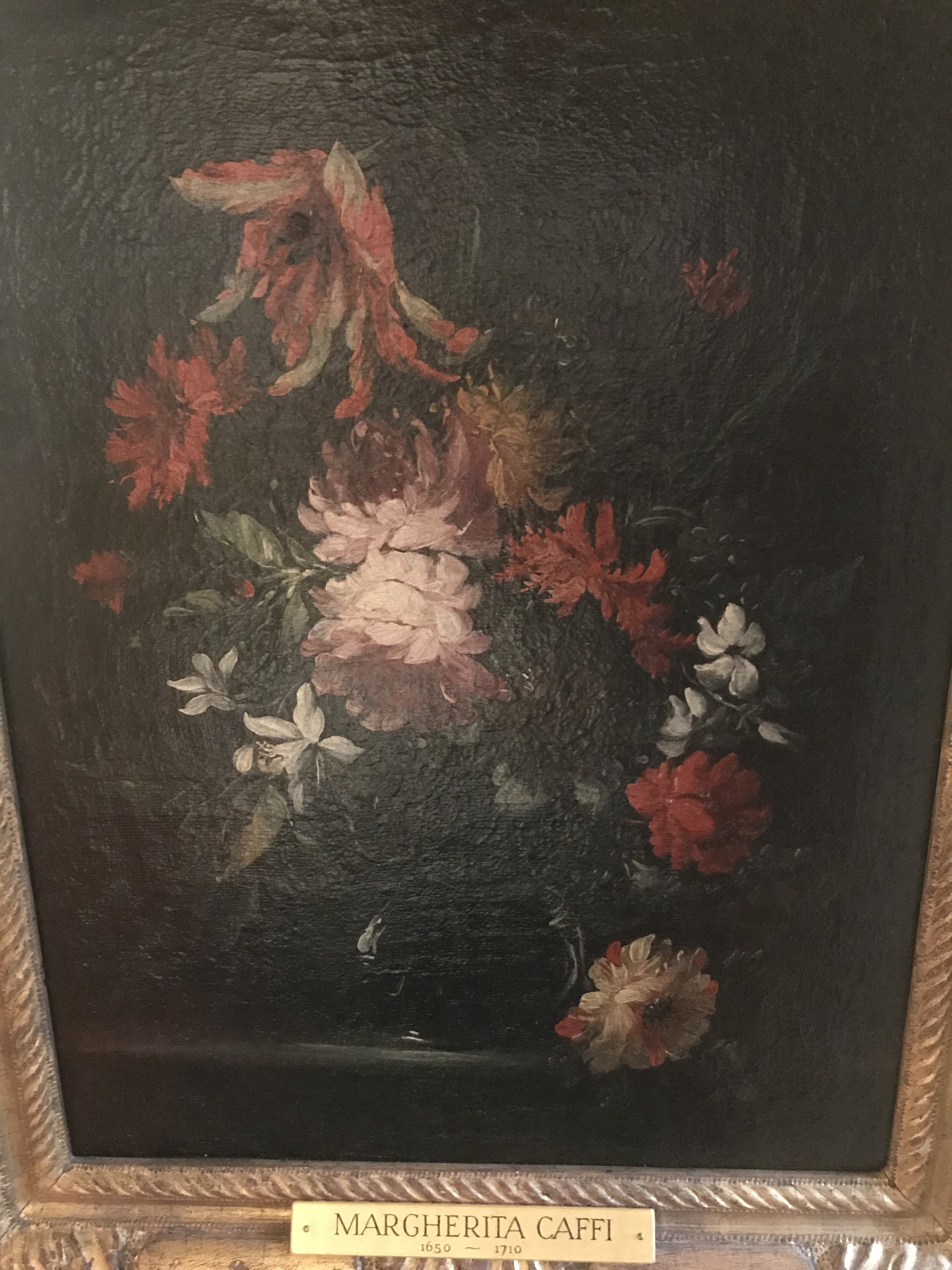
Margherita Caffi (Milan 1650/51 - 1710) from Dr. Jeffrey Lant Collection

Teresa Margherita Volò Caffi (26 March 1648 – 20 September 1710) was an Italian painter of still lifes of flowers and fruit. She was born Margherita Volò, in Milan to Vincenzo Volò (1620-1671), known Vincenzino dei fiori (a still-life painter himself) and his wife Veronica Masoli (1631–1714). In 1668, she married Ludovico Caffi (1644–1695; also a still-life painter) in Cremona. She settled in Piacenza in 1670. She is known to have had at least four children. She died in Milan at the age of sixty.

There are a number of unsigned paintings depicting "still lives with flowers", previously attributed to Francesco Guardi, known as Pseudo-Guradi Maestro di Fiori Guardeschi, but now postulated as likely the work of either Francesco Duramano, Carlo Henrici, Elisabetta Marchioni, and/or Margherita.

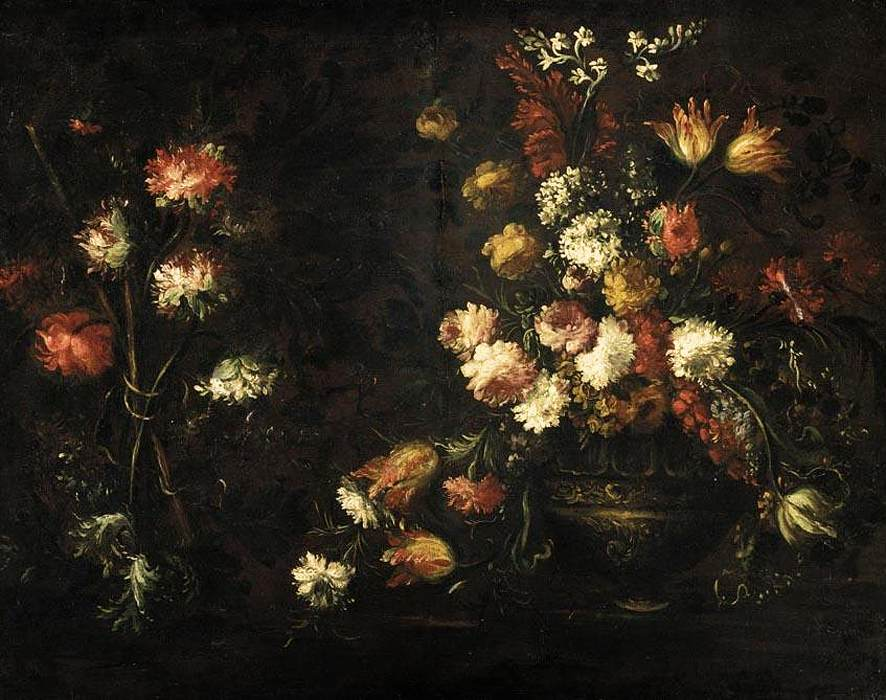
Still-Life with a Vase of Flowers by Margherita Caffi, private collection
