= Chai Jingyi =

Chinese artist

Chai Jingyi (柴靜儀, 17th-century, early Qing; died c. 1680 CE) was a Chinese poet and painter. She produced two collections of poems, and was also known for her paintings of flowers. She was a member of the aristocracy and the daughter of Chai Yunqian, sister of Chai Zhenyi, spouse of Shen Hajia, and mother of Shen Yongji and Shen Zazhi. She was the chairperson of the famous women's literary club Jiaoyan qizi (Banana Garden).

After her death, fellow women she had mentored in poetry and art, such as Lin Yining, wrote poems in her memory.
