= Kiyohara Yukinobu =

Japanese artist (1643–1682)

- Born: 1643; Kyoto, Japan
- Died: 1682 (aged 38–39)
- Known for: Painting
- Movement: Kanō school

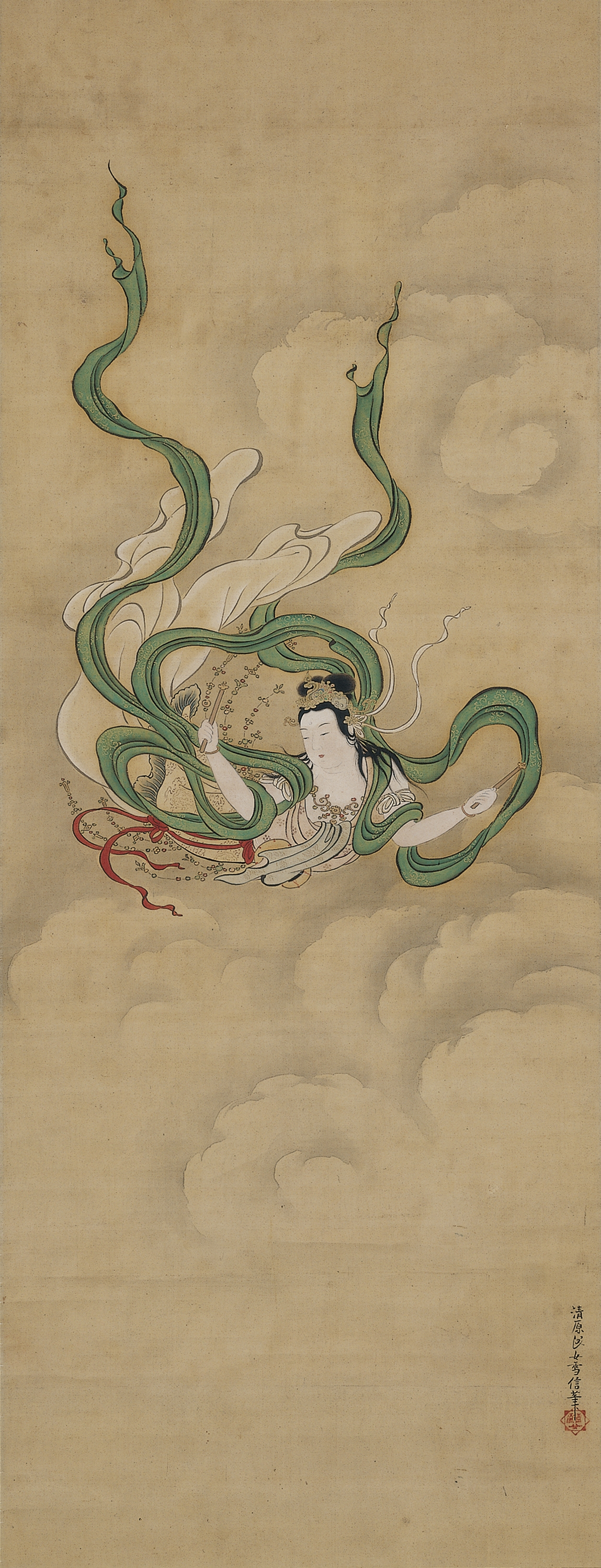
Flying Celestial

Kiyohara Yukinobu (清原雪信, 1643–1682) was a Japanese painter and one of the foremost women identified with the Kanō school.

Her father Kusumi Morikage was also a painter and her mother Kuniko was the niece of his longtime teacher and patron Kanō Tan'yū. Yukinobu lived in Kyoto and likely studied under her father. Her work covered a wide variety of formats ranging from small scrolls to large screens. Thematically she was skilled in the Yamato-e style but was also notable for producing many works depicting women including legendary figures such as Murasaki Shikibu.

Because many of Yukinobu's works are signed and sealed with her name, it suggests she had achieved enough recognition to receive commissions from middle class townspeople and samurai. A pair of her screens, Birds and Flowers of the Four Seasons (late 17th – early 18th century) was shown publicly for the first time in 2015 as part of an exhibition at the Kosetsu Memorial Museum in Tokyo.

Ihara Saikaku's The Life of an Amorous Woman includes a story in which a courtesan commissions a work from Yukinobu.
