= Strozzi chapel =

Strozzi chapel may refer to:

- Cappella Strozzi di Mantova, Santa Maria Novella, Florence
- Filippo Strozzi Chapel, Santa Maria Novella, Florence
