= Giotto's Crucifix at Santa Maria Novella =

Cross painted by Giotto di Bondone

Christ on the cross
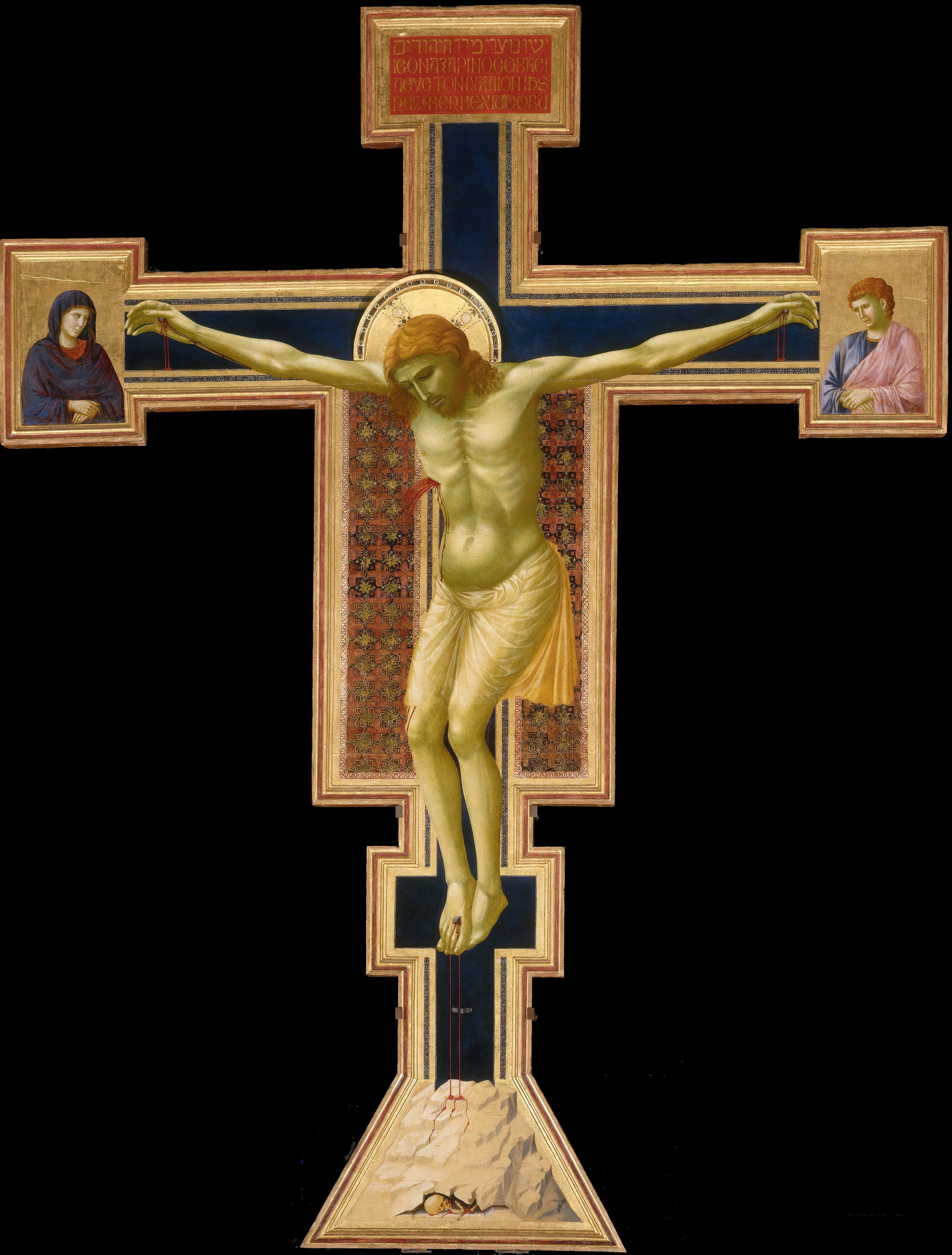
- Artist: Giotto
- Year: 1290
- Medium: Tempera on wood
- Movement: Pre-Renaissance
- Subject: Sacred art
- Dimensions: 578 × 406 cm
- Location: Santa Maria Novella; 43°46′30″N 11°14′58″E

Giotto's Crucifix at Santa Maria Novella is a cross painted in tempera and gold on wood panel (578 x 406 cm) by Giotto di Bondone around 1290–1295. The crucifix is preserved in the center of the nave of Florence's Santa Maria Novella basilica. It is one of the earliest known works by the artist, then in his early twenties.

== History ==
The earliest source mentioning the Crucifix in Florence's Dominican Basilica as a work by Giotto is the testimony of a certain Ricuccio di Puccio del Miller, dated June 15, 1312, which states that a certain sum was allocated to keep a lamp lit in front of the crucifix. Lorenzo Ghiberti, in his Commentaries (mid-15th century), mentions the presence of Giotto's work and dates it to around 1290, contemporary with the Histories of Saint Francis in the upper church of the Basilica of St. Francis of Assisi. Vasari later indicates a collaboration with Puccio Capanna.

The Crucifix has been the subject of intense debate among historians concerning its correct identification, the master's contribution and that of various assistants. When the first restoration was carried out for the Giotto exhibition in 1937, many argued in favor of a complete autograph, but Richard Offner (1939) and Millard Meiss (1960) preferred to speak more cautiously of the Maestro of the Frescoes of St. Francis of Assisi, who is still sometimes referred to as the "non Giotto" in complex discussions of Giotto's Question. Nowadays, a consensus seems to have been reached regarding Giotto's autograph. The last doubts were dispelled by the restoration of the Opificio delle pietre dure, completed in autumn 2001, during which the very high quality of the execution and underlying drawing were rediscovered. Strong technical affinities with other works referencing the young Giotto were then highlighted (Madonna of Borgo San Lorenzo, Madonna of San Giorgio alla Costa).

The same applies to the dating of the Cross, with fluctuations between the late eighties of the thirteenth and the early fourteenth centuries. The discovery of Ricuccio's will established a first ante quem term advanced to 1301, the year in which the Lucchese Deodato Orlandi signed a cross for the Poor Clares of San Miniato al Tedesco clearly inspired by that of Santa Maria Novella, in which he abandoned the "Greek" conventions followed by Cimabue and all the other painters. The remarkable similarities with the crucifix in the background of the fresco with Jerome examining the stigmata in the upper church of St. Francis of Assisi, dated 1295, further anticipate the term ante quem.

On the other hand, the work seems to have been executed after the Madonna di Borgo San Lorenzo, dated circa 1290: the vision is more analytical, the tonalities more delicate and the figures show greater tenderness of feeling. It has been dated to the years 1290–1295, making it one of the artist's earliest works.

== Description ==
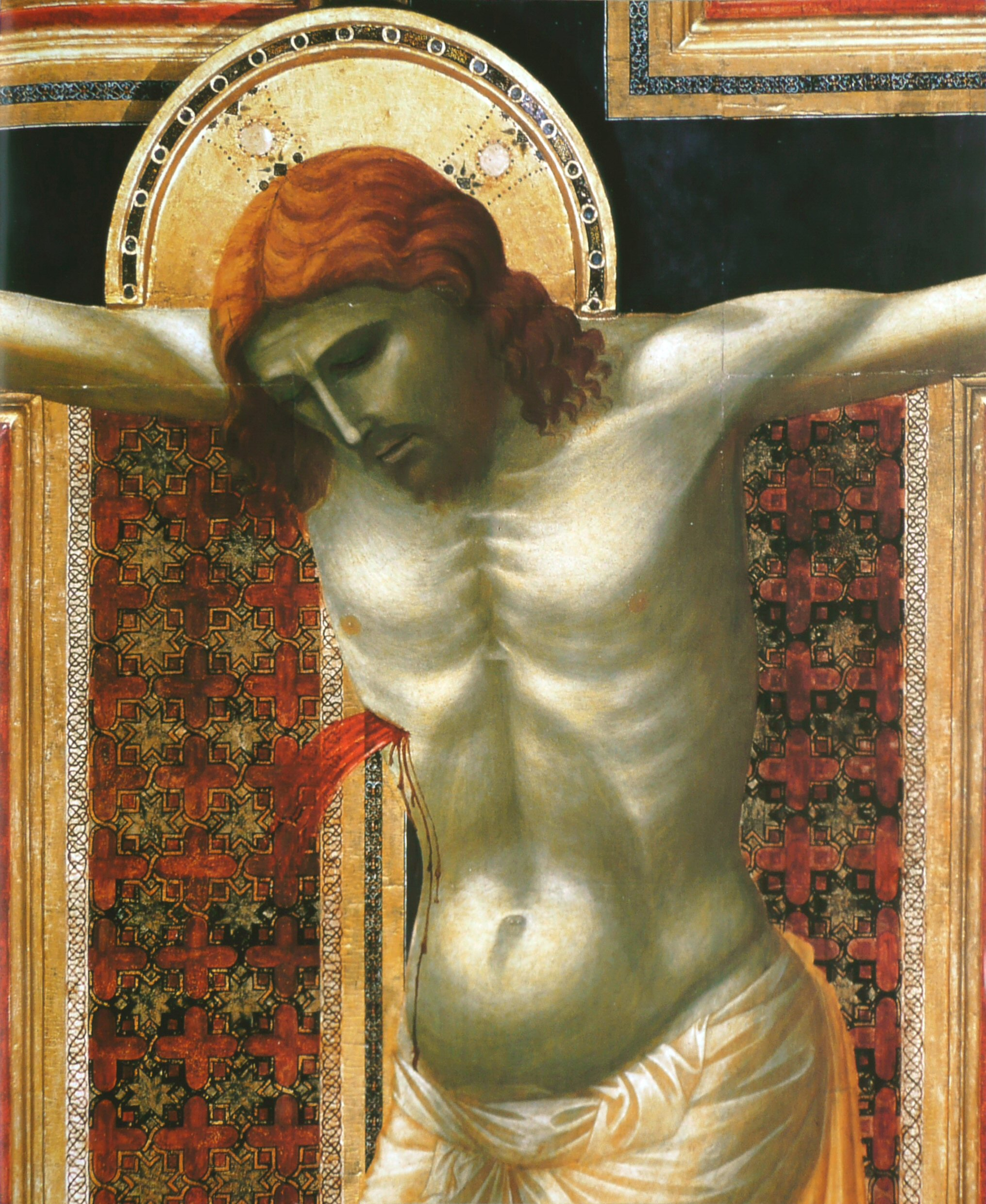
Detail

Giotto's Crucifix is considered a fundamental work in the history of Italian art, as it deepens and renews the iconography of the Christus patiens introduced to the peninsula in the first half of the 13th century by Giunta Pisano.

In contrast to the iconography now "canonized" by Giunta Pisano of the Christus patiens sinuously arched to the left (for the observer), Giotto paints the corpse vertically, legs bent, allowing the full weight to be released. Painted in a more naturalistic pose, the entire figure sinks downwards, leaning back and head forward, overwhelmed by its own weight. The form, no longer sublimated by the usual stylistic elements, thus becomes human and popular.

The edges of the longitudinal arm of the cross are decorated with geometric motifs reminiscent of fabric, while the sides of the transverse arm feature, as usual, the two mourners, the Virgin and Saint John the Evangelist.

At the bottom, on the trapezoidal base, the arid rocks in perspective form a naturalistic base, alluding to Mount Golgotha, on which the cross is sunk. According to medieval tradition, the tomb of Adam, the first man, was placed on Mount Golgotha. Christ's blood trickles down from the cross into the rocks, then reaches the cavity containing Adam's bones, as a symbol of man's redemption from sin through Christ's sacrifice.

These novelties contain all the meaning of the new religious sensibility, which gives Christ back his earthly dimension and draws from it the deepest spiritual meaning. Only the Aureola recalls his divine nature, but Giotto shows a humble man who truly suffers, with whom the observer can compare his pain.

Intended for procession, it conforms to the monumental representations of Christ on the Cross of the period, namely :

- Christ on the cross is in the dolens (suffering) position, body drooping, belly protruding on its perizonium, head bent forward touching the shoulder, ribs protruding, bloody wounds, feet superimposed.
- The crucifix has a tabellone (small panels with scenes on the ends of the cross: Virgin Mary on the left, Saint John the Apostle on the right, Adam's skull below the Golgotha mound; above, the tabellone is probably confused with the titulus.
- Patterned background behind the body of Christ.

== Style ==
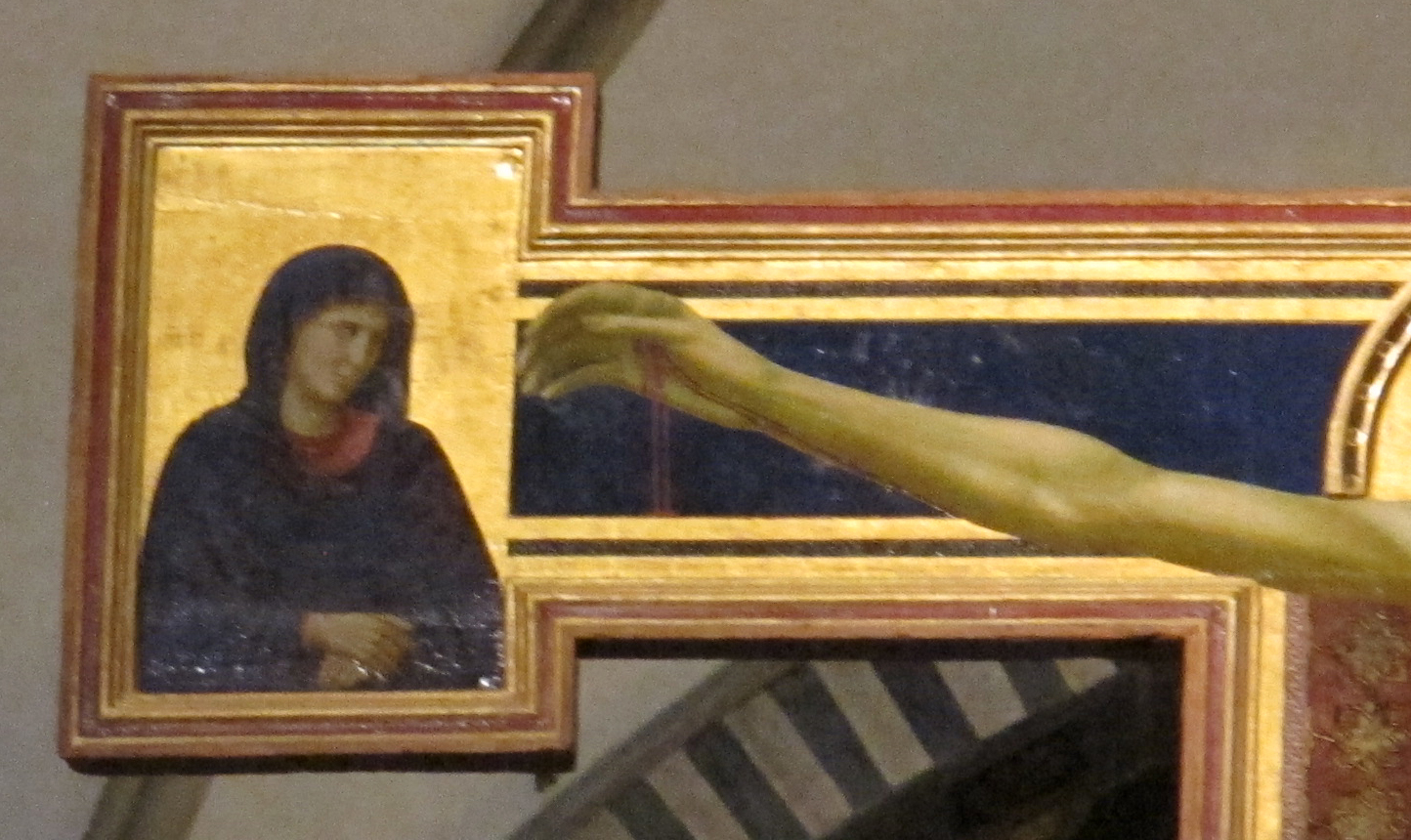
Detail of the Virgin's tabellone.

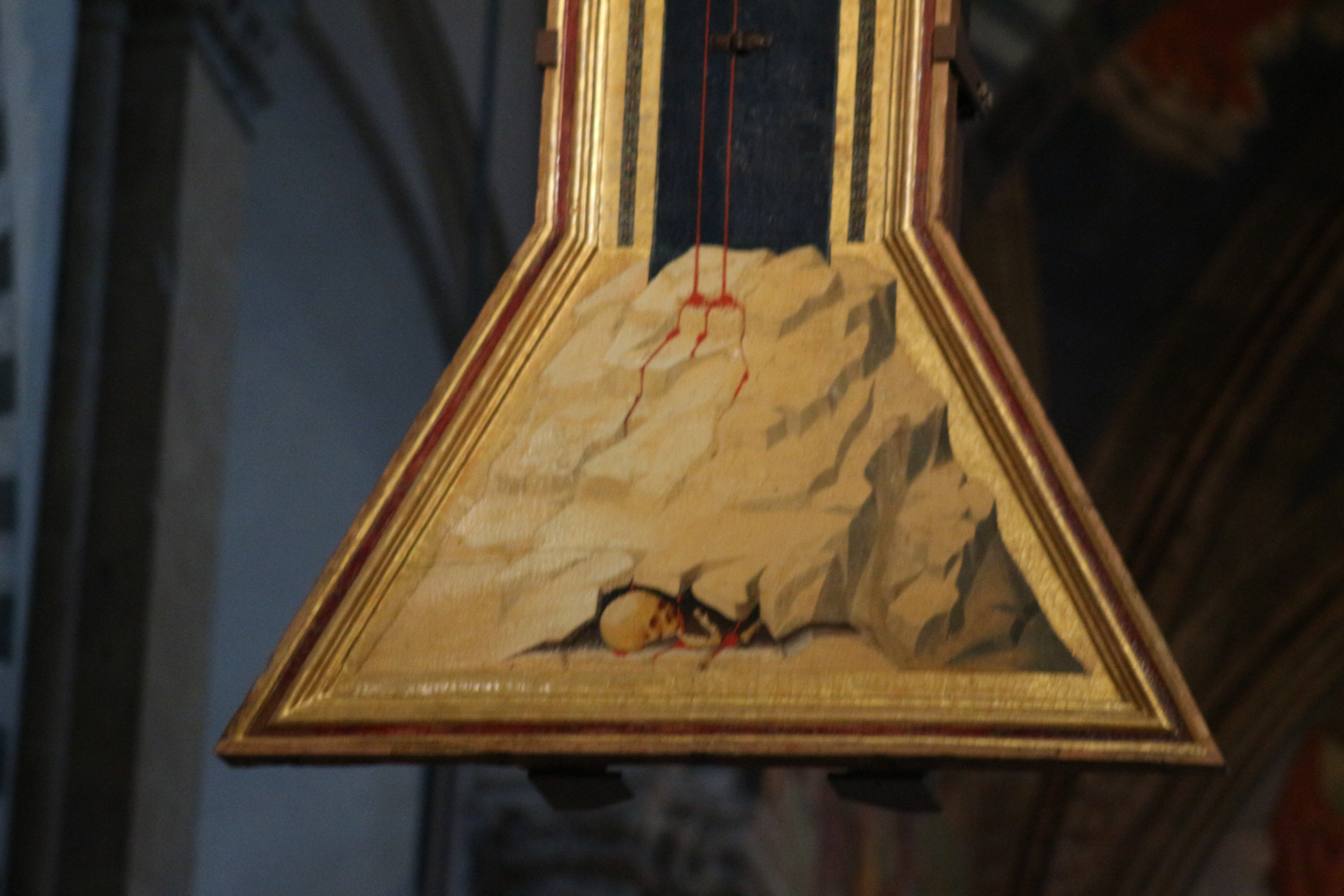
Detail of the base mound.

Giotto abandons the iconography of Christ hunched over on the left, typical of Giunta Pisano and Cimabue, and paints him in a more naturalistic pose: the whole body sinks downwards, as evidenced by the oblique arms, no longer parallel to the ground. The head swings forward rather than resting on the shoulder, and the torso also protrudes forward from the belly and pelvis in painful abandon. The knees are bent forward under the weight of the body, following an inspiration linked to the sculptural tradition (of Giovanni Pisano, for example) rather than that traditionally associated with Byzantine painting. The legs are crossed and blocked by a single nail in the feet, in a manner already used by Nicola Pisano in the lunette of the Deposition in the left portal of Lucca Cathedral (circa 1270). Also striking are the details of the hands, which, lacking strength, have the fingers projected slightly forward in relation to the palms nailed to the cross, with an illusion of perspective never seen before. Giotto's Christ is more three-dimensional and occupies a larger space than Cimabue's earlier works.

The contrast is rendered by fine filaments, as Cimabue did, but more blended to create "smoky" passages between light and dark areas. Moreover, for the first time, Giotto pays attention to the single source of light: all chiaroscuro passages are rendered with its source in mind.

The restoration of the work brought to light a number of hitherto unknown features, including the extreme refinement of an expert workshop, and the change Giotto made to the figure of Christ as he worked, which became more elongated and inclined (which also led to a modification of the wooden structure already in place).

The two mourners at the ends of the arms of the cross are depicted from the side, rather than from the front, as in Cimabue's Santa Croce Crucifix, fifteen years earlier. They are more volumetric due to their pose, the swelling of the drapery and the attention paid to the origin of the only source of light.

== Related articles ==
- List of paintings by Giotto di Bondone
- Lower Church of the Basilica of Saint Francis of Assisi
- Upper Church of the Basilica of Saint Francis of Assisi
- Italian Primitives
- Crucifixion in the arts

== Bibliography ==
- Gaeta, Marcello (2013). Giotto und die croci dipinte des Trecento (in Italian). Rhema. ISBN 9783868870121.
- La Croce di Santa Maria Novella (in Italian). Edifir. 2001. ISBN 88-7970-107-X.
- Giotto. Rizzoli. 2004.
- Baccheschi, Edi (1978). L'opera completa di Giotto (in Italian). Milano: Rizzoli.
