= Biblioteca Cathariniana =

Public library in Pisa, Italy

- Cateriniana
- 43.721591°N 10.404097°E
- Location: Pisa, Tuscany, Italy
- Type: Public library
- Established: 13th century

Collection
- Size: Over 32,000 books (20,000 modern, 12,000 antique)

Other information
- Affiliation: Archbishop's Seminary (Seminario Arcivescovile)
- Website: www.biblioteca-cateriniana.pisa.it

The Biblioteca Cathariniana or Cateriniana is a public library in Pisa, region of Tuscany, Italy. It is affiliated with the Archbishop's Seminary (Seminario Arcivescovile).

== History ==
The library was founded in the 13th-century in the Dominican convent of Santa Caterina d’Alessandria. The convent of Santa Caterina was affiliated with scholars such as Giordano da Rivalto, Bartolomeo da San Concordio, and Domenico Cavalca. These scholars participated in the religious education of students at the monastery. A nucleus of the collection was the donation of 61 codexes by Fra Proino di Orlandino da Fabro, cofounder of the monastery and colleague of Thomas Aquinas.

After the suppression of monasteries in 1783, the collection acquired part of the library of Guido Grandi from the Camaldolese Monastery of San Michele in Borgo. In 1784, this monastery was suppressed but the Archbishop obtained the present site for the Seminary of the diocese. The collection of the Barnabite Convent of San Frediano and the collections of 18th-century archbishop Francesco Frosini and the 19th-century archbishop/cardinal Cosimo Corsi were added.

== Collections ==
There is a modern and antique collection. The modern collection has over 20,000 volumes from 1830 onward, including 150 journals no longer published. It is particularly rich in theology, patristic and more recent church history. But also has collections in anthropology, philosophy, sociology, pedagogy, and psychology. It possesses the entire collection of the L'Osservatore Romano.

The antique collection has nearly 12,000 books, including 2000 from the 15th century, 98 incunaboli, and 222 manuscript books.
