= Andrea di Bonaiuto da Firenze =

Italian painter (1319–1377)

Andrea di Bonaiuto
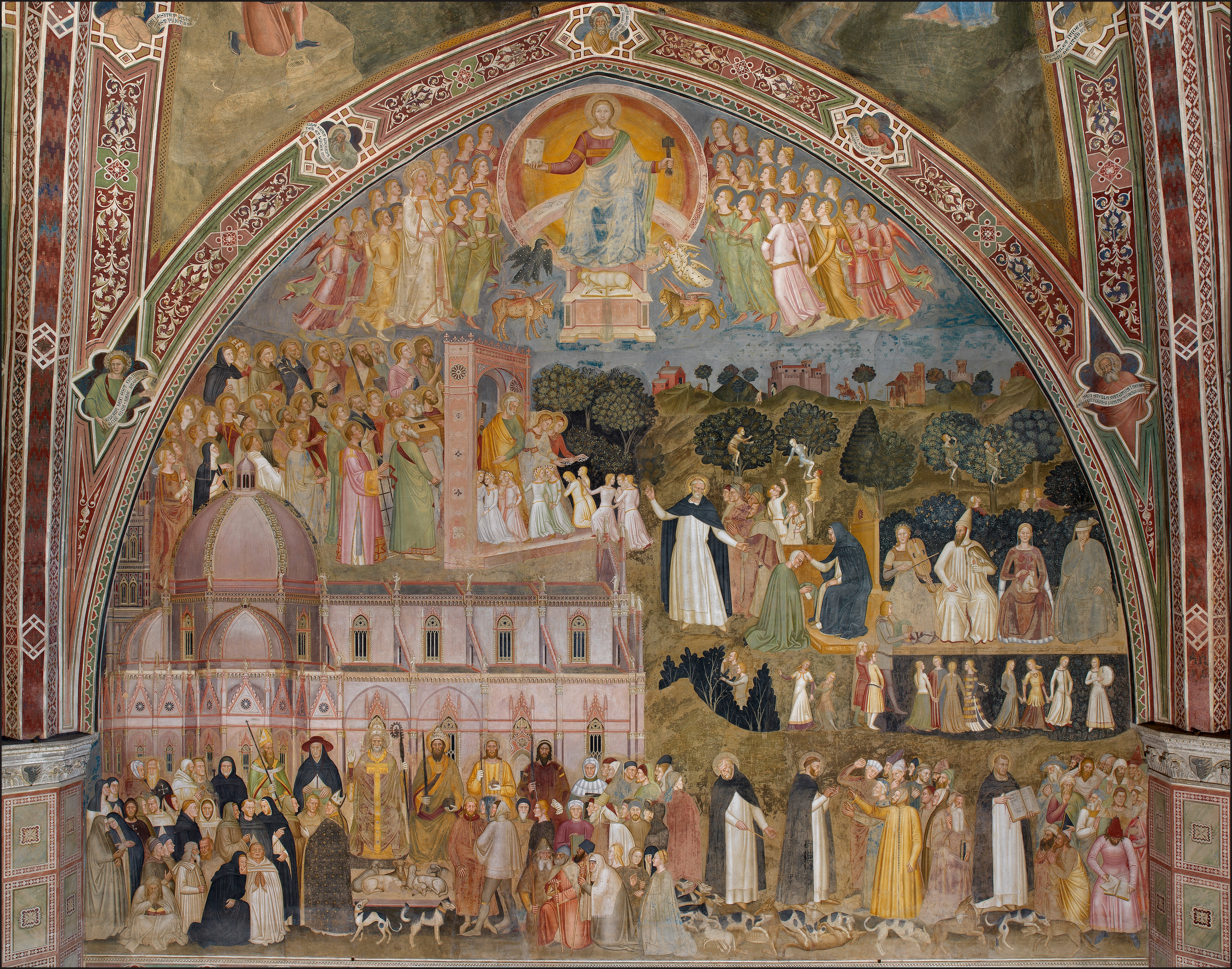
- The Way of Salvation fresco in the Basilica of Santa Maria Novella, Florence
- Born: March 1319; Florence, Republic of Florence
- Died: July 1377 (aged 58); Pisa, Republic of Pisa
- Other name: Andrea da Firenze
- Occupation: Painter

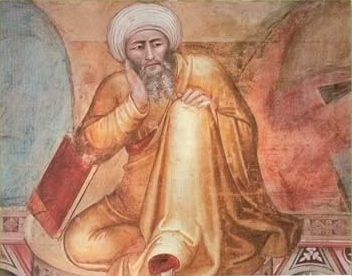
Andalusian philosopher Ibn Rushd, 14th-century painting by Andrea di Bonaiuto

Andrea di Bonaiuto da Firenze (March 1319 – July 1377), or simply Andrea da Firenze, was an Italian painter active in Florence.

He was probably born in Florence where he was active from 1343. His earliest works suggest that he was in close contact with the workshop of Andrea di Cione.

Andrea di Bonaiuto is known for his stained glass window of the Coronation of Mary in the Basilica of Santa Maria Novella, and his fresco decorations in the Spanish chapel (Cappellone degli Spagnoli) of the chapter house there. The central theme of the frescos in the chapel is the glorification of the Dominican Order.

From mid 1366 to mid 1367 Andrea di Bonaiuto was one of the artists advising on the construction of Florence Cathedral.

He died in Pisa while working on a fresco on the Legend of St Raniero at the Camposanto Monumentale.

Although a follower of traditional models, Andrea di Bonaiuto brought innovation by softening details and contours with soft and blended shadows and emphasizing the two-dimensional aspect of the painted surface through painted and punched decorative effects.
