= Domenico Cavalca =

Italian writer and preacher (c. 1270–1342)

Father Domenico Cavalca O.P.
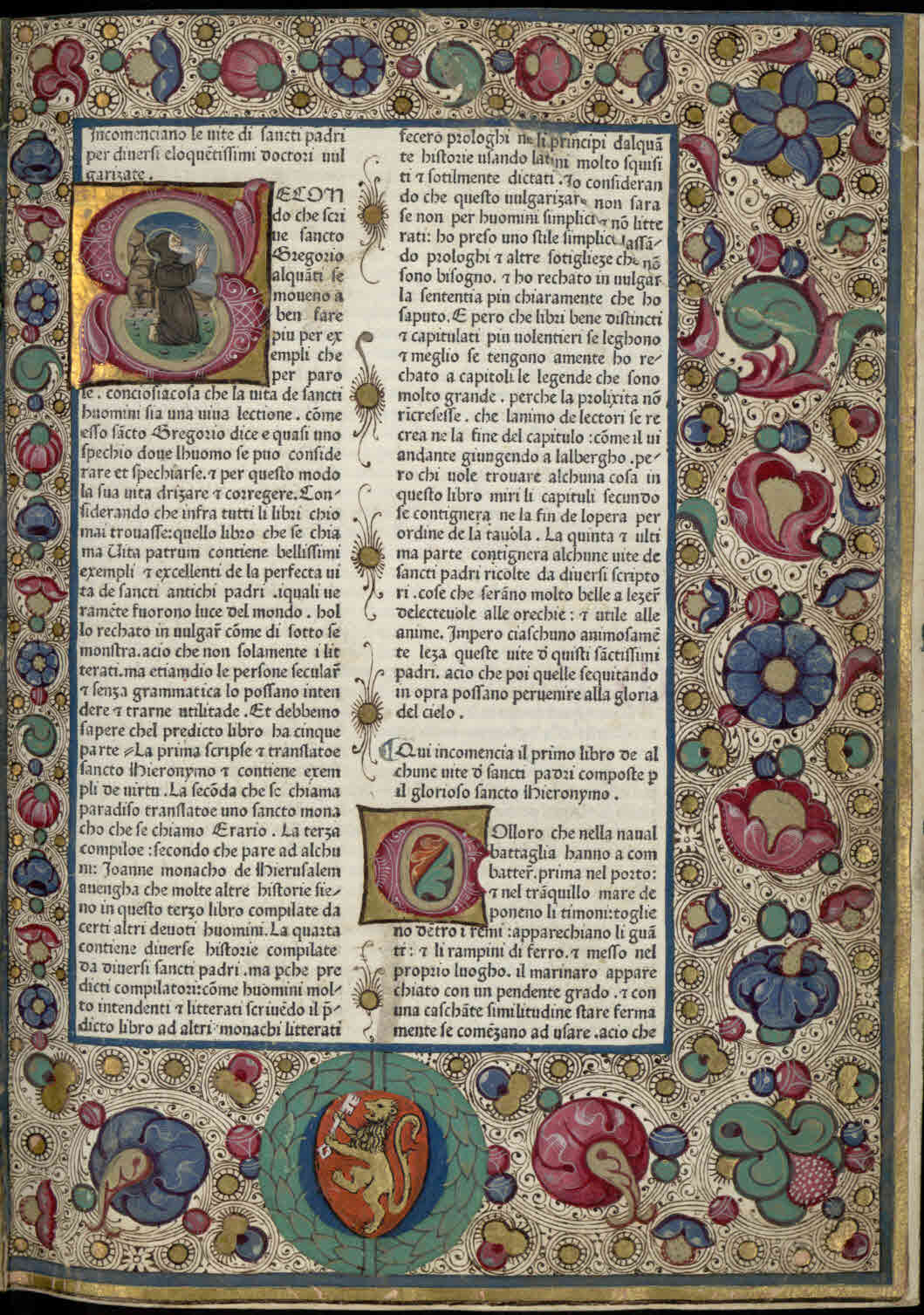
- First page of the Italian vernacular translation of the Vitae Patrum, before 1474
- Born: c. 1270; Vicopisano, Republic of Pisa (now in Tuscany, Italy)
- Died: October 1342; Pisa, Republic of Pisa (now in Tuscany, Italy)
- Resting place: Santa Caterina, Pisa
- Occupations: Dominican friar, writer, scholar
- Writing career
- Language: Italian (Tuscan and Pisan dialect); Latin
- Period: High Middle Ages; Early Renaissance
- Notable work: Italian translation of the Vitae Patrum

Domenico Cavalca OP (Vicopisano, c. 1270 – Pisa, October 1342) was an Italian Dominican friar, preacher and writer. He wrote a wealth of moral and ascetic vernacular treatises. In the nineteenth century he was hailed by the Italian purists as a master of prose-style.

== Biography ==
Little is known about the life of Cavalca. The Chronicles and Annals of the monastery of Saint Catherine in Pisa provide most of our information on his life. He was born around 1270 in Vicopisano perhaps of the noble Gaetani family. After his earliest childhood education he entered the Dominican house of Saint Catherine of Alexandria in Pisa, where he carried out most of his religious and literary work. The convent, founded in 1221, was one of the most important Dominican studia of the Roman province and was endowed with an excellent library. He benefited from a sound theological education although he never became a lector.

In 1300, cooperating with the vicar of the diocese, Bonagiunta of Pisa, he helped to improve discipline in the monastery of St. Agnes. From 1330 onward he served as confessor at the monastery of Mercy. Cavalca was extremely active as a preacher and ecclesiastic reformer. He lived a life of irreproachable morals, characterized by attention to the poor and the sick. He dedicated much time and care to nunneries in the province of Pisa and his activity led to the foundation in 1342, just before his death, of the Dominican nunnery of St. Martha (today no longer existing) in Pisa.

Cavalca was known as "Dominicus hospedalarius" due to his outstanding concern for the sick. The chronicle tells us that his reputation for saintliness was well founded in his exemplary practice of the Rule, and that, at his death in November, 1342, his funeral procession drew a crowd of the poor and afflicted. He was probably buried at Saint Catherine's, but no tomb, early inscription, or portrait has survived.

== Works ==
The works of Cavalca, of religious or ascetic subject, are in part original, in part derived from Latin texts. As a preaching brother, he had frequent contact with the laity and was aware that the Latin original was inaccessible to them. He tells us in the introduction to the Vite that it was his intention to make the vast hagiographic corpus of the Desert Fathers' stories available to the "uomini semplici e non licterati" (simple, uneducated men). His translation of the Vitae Patrum, soon transposed from the Pisan dialect into Florentine, was the collection of saints' lives most copied in its entirety in Late Medieval and Early Renaissance Italy, and it is preserved in nearly 200 manuscripts. It was through reading the life of Mary of Egypt in Cavalca's text that Giovanni Colombini was convinced to become an anchorite. The popularity of the text continued into the latter half of the 15th century with the invention of the printing press: twenty editions of the Vite were published between 1474 and 1499.

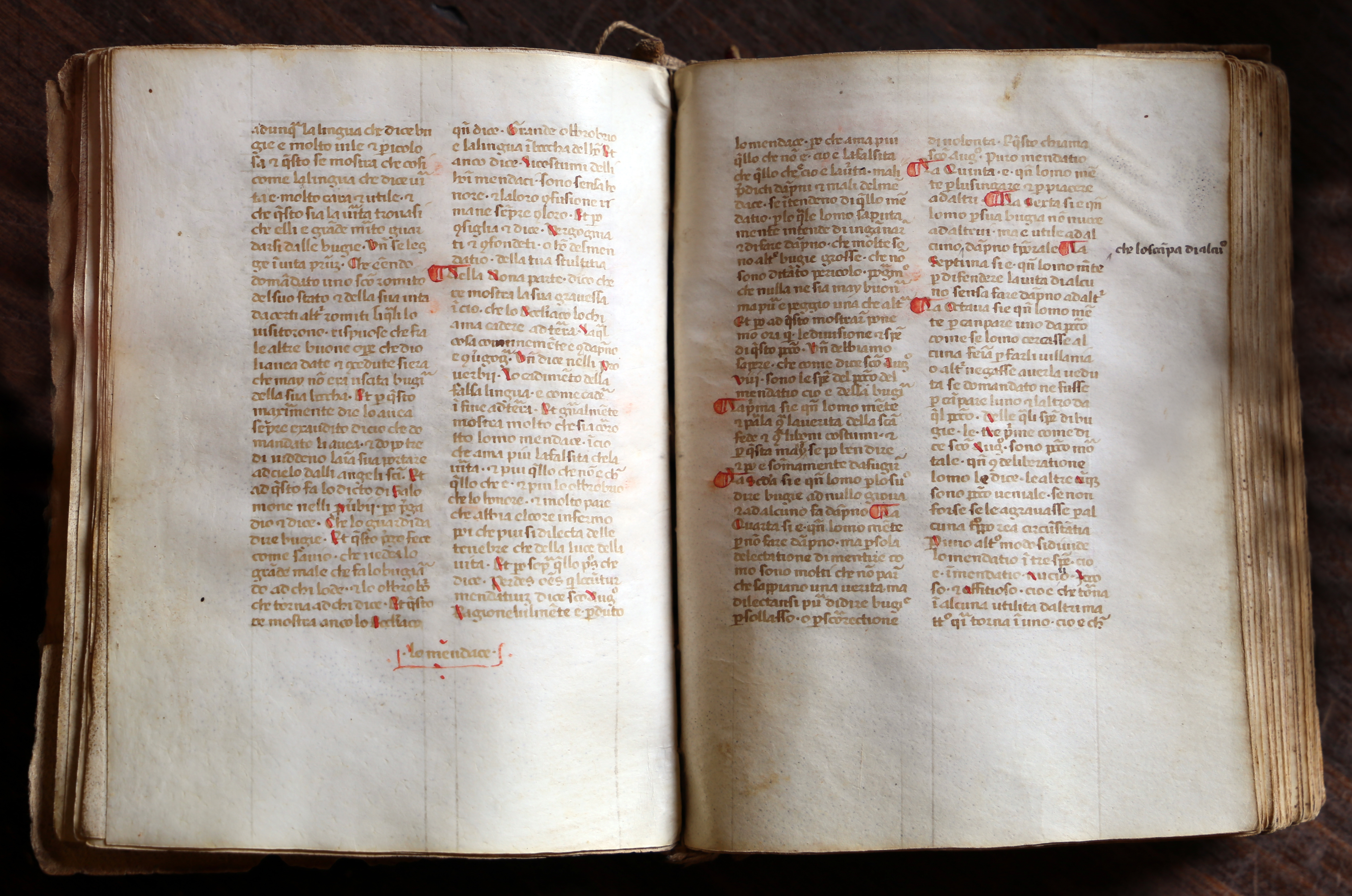
A 14th-Century Manuscript of Cavalca's Pungilingua

Cavalca's other translations include the Dialogues of Saint Gregory (c. 1329), Letter 22 of Saint Jerome (addressed to Eustochium), and the Book of Acts. His treatises are strongly influenced by Summae virtutum ac vitiorum, a treatise written in the thirteenth century by the French Dominican William Perault. The first of these works was probably The Mirror of the Cross (Lo Specchio di Croce) which was written before 1233 and which was the most original and influential. Cavalca's Specchio was an important source for St. Catherine of Siena's spiritual writings and was one of the inspirations for the widespread Trabalhos de Jesus by Thomas of Jesus. Cavalca also wrote poetry that he conceived as a complement to his treatises.

Cavalca became a very famous writer and his works were printed several times in the following centuries. He was essentially a popularizer, but his versions of some of the Church Fathers were later highly valued by linguistic purists. His writing style, characterized by simplicity of syntax and clarity, established him as an artistic model for subsequent centuries. Gino Capponi considered him one of the greatest prose writers of the Italian Middle Ages. Cavalca was proclaimed “the father of Italian prose” by the literary critic and scholar Pietro Giordani, and his contribution to the formation of Italian as a literary language was extremely important.

== List of works ==
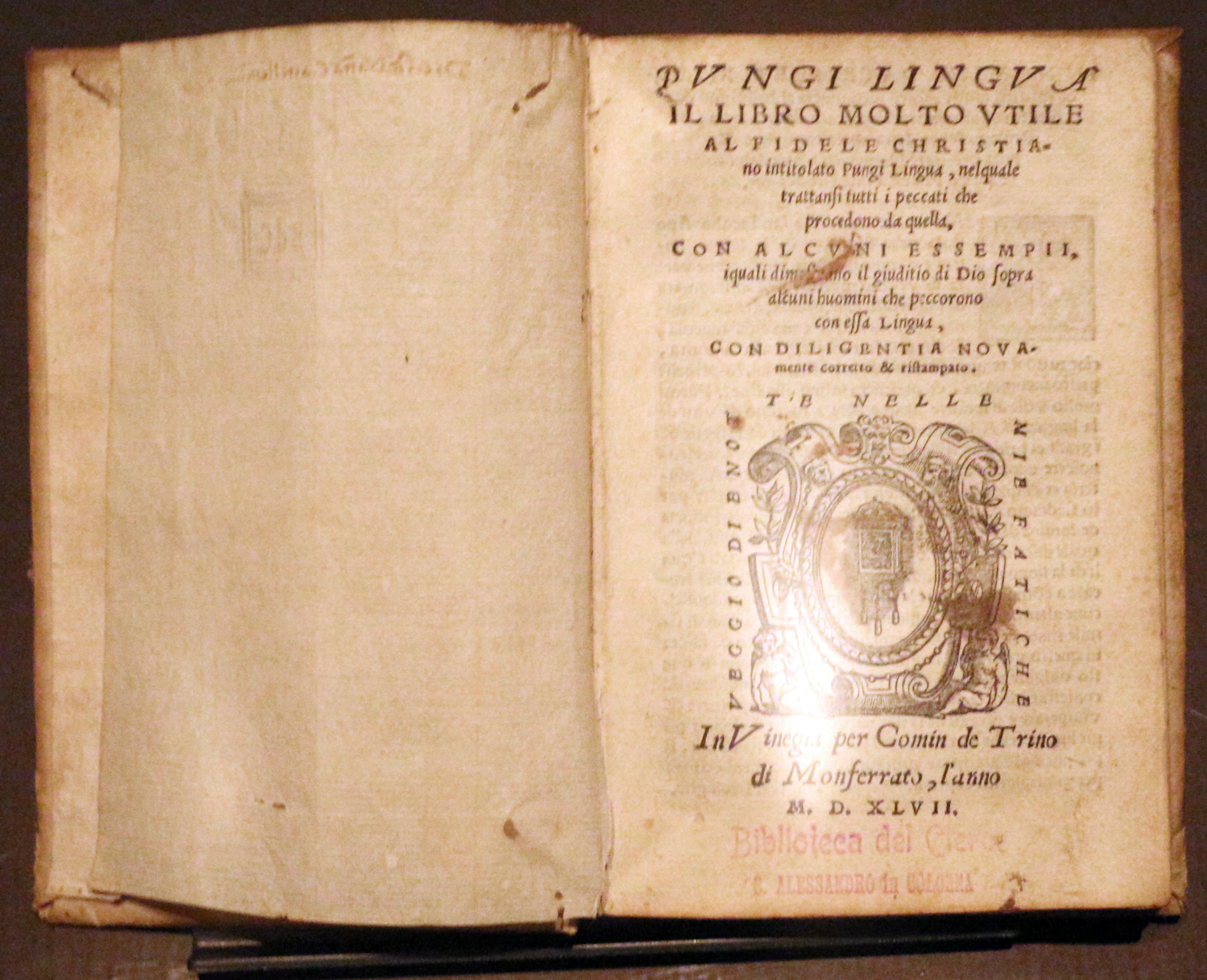
1547 edition of Cavalca's Pungilingua

- Vite dei santi Padri. Translation into the vernacular of the Vitae Patrum. The Vite dei Santi Padri was immensely popular during the Middle Ages. Carlo Delcorno lists 199 surviving manuscripts and 19 incunable editions.
- Dialogo di San Gregorio. Translation into the vernacular of the Dialogues of Pope Gregory I.
- Atti degli Apostoli. Translation into the vernacular of the Acts of the Apostles.
- Epistola di San Girolamo a Eustochio. Translation into the vernacular of a letter of Saint Jerome to Eustochium.
- Specchio di Croce. A treatise inspired by the image of Christ on the cross, with many reflections on the passages of the four Four Gospels about the Passion.
- Medicina del cuore ovvero trattato della Pazienza. A collection of two treatises dedicated to wrath and patience.
- Specchio dei peccati (The mirror of sins), 1333. A treatise with reflections on confession and penitence.
- Pungilingua. A treatrise on the dangers of the misuse of the language.
- Frutti della lingua. A treatise on preaching.
- Disciplina degli spirituali. A treatise about common wrong attitudes of people devoted to spiritual life.
- Trattato delle trenta stoltizie. A treatise about the errors made in the fight against the temptations of the evil.
- Esposizione del Simbolo degli Apostoli.

== Bibliography ==
- Falco, Francesco (1892). Domenico Cavalca, moralista. Lucca: tip. del Serchio.
- Zacchi, Alfonso (1920). "Di fra Domenico Cavalca e delle sue opere". Il Rosario. Memorie Domenicane. XXXVII: 272–281.
- Naselli, Carmelina (1925). Domenico Cavalca. Città di Castello: Il Solco.
- Debenedetti, Santorre (1931). "CAVALCA, Domenico". Enciclopedia Italiana. Rome: Istituto dell'Enciclopedia Italiana.
- Colosio, Innocenzo (1953). "Cavalca (Dominique)". Dictionnaire de Spiritualité ascétique et mystique. Vol. 2. Paris: G. Beauchesne et ses fils. pp. 373–4.
- Delcorno, Carlo (1979). "CAVALCA, Domenico". Dizionario Biografico degli Italiani (in Italian). Vol. 22: Castelvetro–Cavallotti. Rome: Istituto dell'Enciclopedia Italiana. pp. 577–586. ISBN 978-88-12-00032-6.
- Gehl, Paul F. (1994). "Preachers, Teachers and Translators: The Social Meaning of Language Study in Trecento Tuscany". Viator. 25: 308–312. doi:10.1484/J.VIATOR.2.301217.
- Took, John (2002). "Cavalca, Domenico". The Oxford Companion to Italian Literature. Oxford University Press. ISBN 978-0-19-818332-7.
- Casagrande, Carla (2003). ""Specchio di Croce". Domenico Cavalca e l'ordine degli affetti". Comunicazioni Sociali. 25 (2): 221–230. doi:10.1400/23894.
- Lizzi Testa, Rita (2007). "The Ascetic Portrayed: Jerome and Eusebius of Cremona in the Italian Art and Culture of the Renaissance". In H. Amirav; B. Romeny (eds.). From Rome to Constantinople: Studies in Honour of Averil Cameron. Leuven: Peeters Publishers. pp. 303–340. ISBN 9789042919716.
- Iglesias, María Clara (2010). "Flesh and Spirit: Vices and Virtues of Food in Domenico Cavalca's Pungilingua and Frutti della lingua". In Christiana Purdy Moudarres (ed.). Table talk. Perspectives on food in medieval Italian literature. Newcastle upon Tyne, U.K.: Cambridge Scholars Publishing. pp. 37–52.
- Ragazzi, Grazia Mangano (2014). "'Domenico Cavalca and Some Contemporaries of Catherine". In Franco Pierno (ed.). Obeying the Truth: Discretion in the Spiritual Writings of Saint Catherine of Siena. New York: OUP USA. pp. 151–162. doi:10.1093/acprof:oso/9780199344512.003.0011. ISBN 978-0-19-934451-2.
- Santini, Wanda (2015). "Appunti per un approccio sintattico-testuale alla lingua del volgarizzamento delle 'Vite dei santi padri'". In Franco Pierno (ed.). The Church and the Languages of Italy before the Council of Trent. Toronto: Pontifical Institute of Mediaeval Studies. pp. 87–110. doi:10.1515/9781771103626-008. ISBN 978-1-77110-362-6.
- Menichetti, Caterina (2022). "Per Domenico Cavalca traduttore degli Atti degli apostoli (tra filologia e interpretazione)". TranScript. 1 (1): 105–182. doi:10.30687/TranScript/5876-7987/2022/01/006.
- Sassi, Mario (2022). "The language of a preacher: Cavalca, Passavanti, and the first steps toward a national vernacular". Rivista di storia e letteratura religiosa. LVIII (1): 27–50. doi:10.1400/288387.
