= Jacopo Passavanti =

Italian friar, preacher and writer (c. 1302 – 1357)

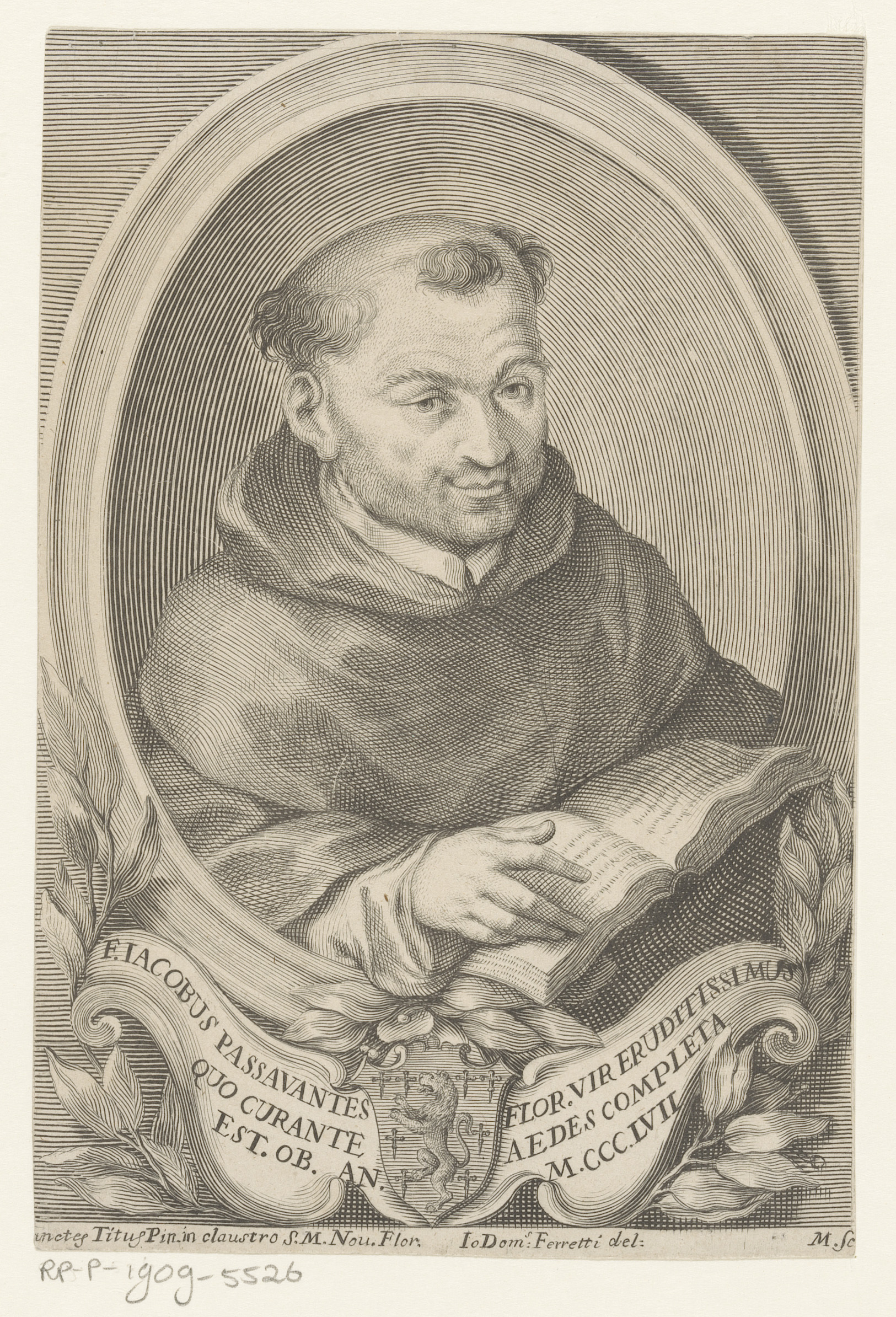
- Jacopo Passavanti
- Born: c. 1302; Florence, Republic of Florence
- Died: 15 June 1357; Florence, Republic of Florence
- Resting place: Santa Maria Novella
- Occupations: Dominican friar; Preacher; Writer; Architect
- Writing career
- Language: Latin; Italian
- Period: 14th century
- Genres: Treatise
- Subject: Religion
- Notable work: Specchio di vera penitenza
- Movement: Early Renaissance

Jacopo Passavanti OP (c. 1302 – 15 June 1357) was an Italian Dominican friar, preacher and writer.

== Biography ==
Jacopo Passavanti's parents were Banco and Cecca di Tornaquinci of old patrician stock. He entered the Dominican convent of Santa Maria Novella at the age of fourteen and held important positions in the order in the course of his life, becoming prior in Pistoia and Florence. Passavanti was, for a number of years, also the vicar of the bishop of Florence Angelo Acciaioli. He studied in Florence and later in Paris (1330–3) before teaching philosophy and theology in Pisa, Siena, and Rome. He returned to Florence in 1340, and during the Black Death (1348) was in charge of the rapidly growing convent library. He supervised the completion of Santa Maria Novella and was partly responsible for the founding of the Florence Charterhouse.

== Works ==
Some of his sermons survive but he is best known for the Specchio di vera penitenza, an elaborate reworking of homilies he delivered in Lent 1354. Through its vivid treatment of the nature of sin and its consequences, it aimed to provide a lay audience with a practical guide to repentance. Passavanti shows impressive doctrinal expertise. He also develops the forty-eight examples with which he illustrates his message into what are in effect novelle, his artistry bearing comparison with that of Giovanni Boccaccio in the Decameron. Several translations are attributed to him; one of the Homilies of Origen, one of St. Augustine's City of God and some accounts from Livy's Ab urbe condita.

== See also ==
- 14th century in literature

== Bibliography ==
- Sorrentino, Andrea (1927). "L'unità concettuale dei canti XI e XII del Paradiso e una leggenda riferita dal Passavanti". Giornale Dantesco. XXX: 45–51.
- Aurigemma, Marcello (1959). "La fortuna critica dello Specchio di vera penitenza di Jacopo Passavanti". Studi in onore di Angelo Monteverdi. 1. Modena: Società tipografica editrice modenese: 48–75.
- Auzzas, Ginetta (1974). "Per il testo dello «Specchio della vera penitenza». Due nuove fonti manoscritte". Lettere Italiane. 26 (3): 261–287. JSTOR 26255264.
- Rossi, Giancarlo (1991). "La redazione latina dello Specchio della vera penitenza". Studi di filologia italiana. 49: 29–58.
- Del Popolo, Concetto (2001). "Una tessera iacoponica in Passavanti". Lettere Italiane. 53 (3): 397–400.
- Kleinhenz, C. (2002). "Passavanti, Iacopo". The Oxford Companion to Italian Literature. Oxford University Press.
- Auzzas, Ginetta (2003). Carlo Delcorno; Maria Luisa Doglio (eds.). "Dalla predica al trattato: lo "Specchio della vera penitenzia" di Iacopo Passavanti". Scrittura Religiosa. Forme Letterarie Dal Trecento al Cinquecento. Bologna: 37–57.
- Corbari, Eliana (2013). Vernacular Theology: Dominican Sermons and Audience in Late Medieval Italy. Walter de Gruyter. pp. 49–53. ISBN 978-3110240337.
- Auzzas, Ginetta (2014). "PASSAVANTI, Iacopo". Dizionario Biografico degli Italiani (in Italian). Vol. 81: Pansini–Pazienza. Rome: Institute of the Italian Encyclopaedia. ISBN 978-88-12-00032-6.
- Sassi, Mario (2022). "The language of a preacher: Cavalca, Passavanti, and the first steps toward a national vernacular". Rivista di storia e letteratura religiosa. LVIII (1): 27–50. doi:10.1400/288387.
