= Obelisks of the Corsa dei Cocchi =

Marble obelisk monuments In Florence, Italy

The Obelisks of the Corsa dei Cocchi, or Aguglie di Piazza Santa Maria Novella are two 16th-century, four-sided, marble obelisk monuments located in the Piazza of Santa Maria Novella, Florence, region of Tuscany, Italy.

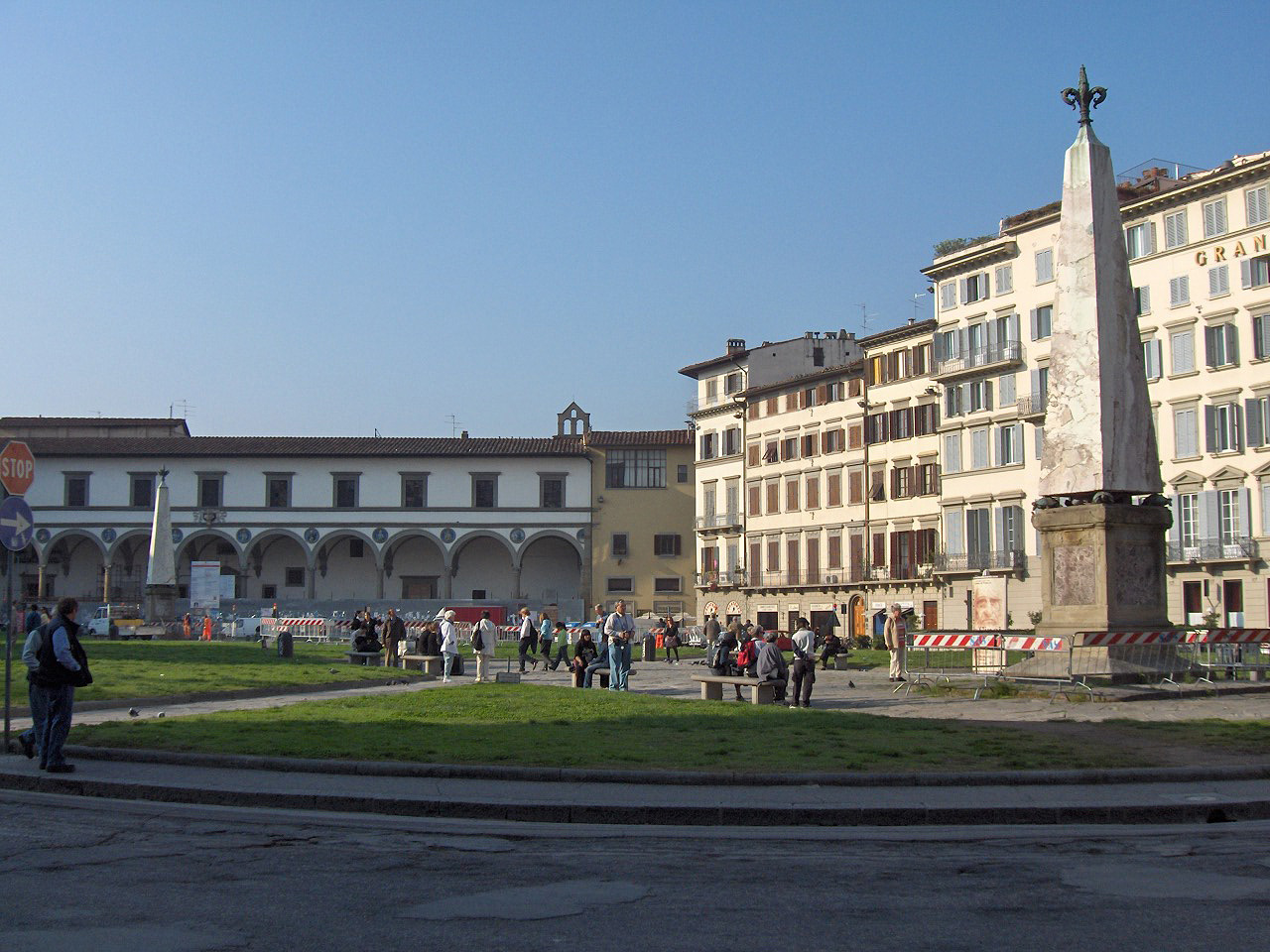
Piazza Santa Maria Novella with two obelisks.

The obelisks replaced two pyramidal wooden structures used to mark the margins of the track used in a festival race, Palio dei Cocchi, held the day before the day of San Giovanni. The present obelisks were designed in 1570 by Bartolomeo Ammannati, with the help of the stonemasons Raffaello and Giovanni Maria Carli. The idea for the four turtles, upon which the marble obelisks perch, has more recently been attributed to Giambologna or his pupil, Pietro Tacca. The obelisks were transported from the quarries to Florence in 1572. They were finally erected in 1608 to celebrate the marriage of the Grand Duke Cosimo II to Maria Maddalena of Austria. In the early 1790s, the obelisk underwent refurbishment, adding the bronze Florentine Fleur-de-lis or lily symbol, the giglio, on the top and adding the polished breccia marble plaques to the base. The current plates are made of red Levanto marble.

The conceit of turtle bases was originally used in the Boboli Obelisk.
