= Santa Maria Novella =

Church in Florence, Italy

Basilica of Santa Maria Novella
- Basilica di Santa Maria Novella (Italian)
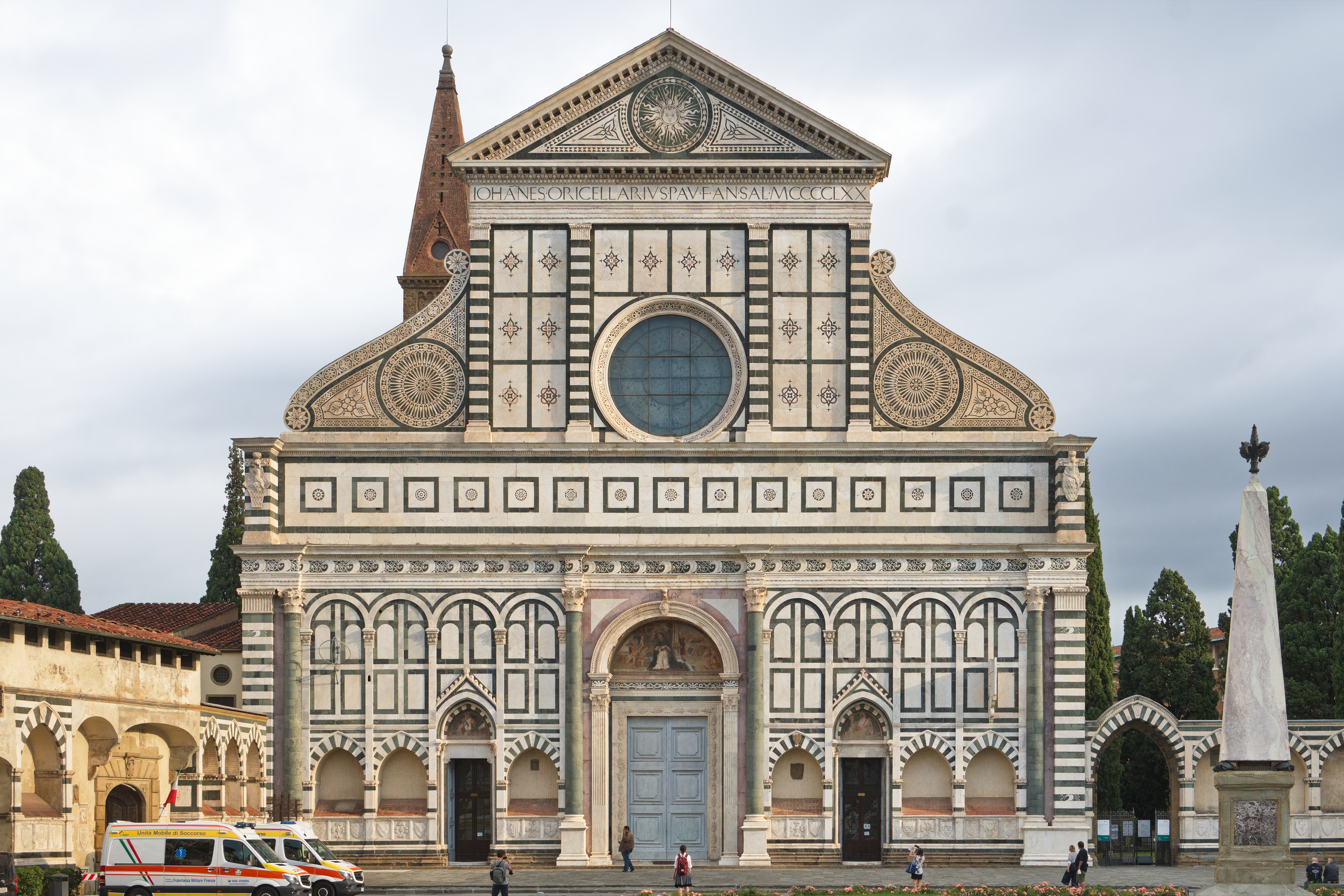
- The façade of Santa Maria Novella, completed by Leon Battista Alberti in 1470

Religion
- Affiliation: Catholic
- Diocese: Archdiocese of Florence
- Rite: Catholic
- Ecclesiastical or organisational status: Minor basilica
- Year consecrated: 1420

Location
- Location: Florence, Tuscany, Italy
- Interactive map of Basilica of Santa Maria Novella
- Coordinates: 43.7746°N 11.2493°E

Architecture
- Architect: Leon Battista Alberti (façade)
- Type: Church
- Style: Gothic-Renaissance
- Groundbreaking: 1279
- Completed: 14th century

Santa Maria Novella is a Dominican church in Florence. It is considered the most important Romano-Gothic church in Tuscany and is a World Heritage Site. Its construction started in 1290 and it took almost 200 years to be completed. It was consecrated in 1420.

Its distinctive façade has geometric patterns made from white and green marble. The Florentine Renaissance architect Leon Battista designed the upper part of the façade, finished in 1470.

Its two most famous artworks are Giotto's Crucifix, that changed the way that Christ had been represented in the cross for two centuries, and Masaccio's Holy Trinity, the first monumental Renaissance painting to utilize linear perspective.

Its building and decoration was financed by rich Florentine families, several of which were granted the privilege of funerary chapels inside the church.

== History ==
In 1221, the Florence Diocese assigned to John of Salerno (Dominican) the oratory of Santa Maria delle Vigne ("by the vineyards"), which at the time was surrounded by agricultural fields and outside the city walls. The Dominicans decided to build a new church, which was named Santa Maria Novella ('New'), as well as an adjoining cloister. The church was consecrated in 1420 by Pope Pope Eugene IV. In October 1919, Pope Benedict XV elevated it to the rank of a minor basilica.

Construction began around 1276 and took close to 200 years, when the upper part of the façade, designed by the renaissance architect Leon Battista Alberti, was completed in 1470, although the right scroll was covered in marble only in 1920.

The initial architects may have been the Dominican friars Sisto de Florencia, Jacopo Pasavanti and Ristoro de Campi. The Romanesque-Gothic bell tower and the sacristy were completed under the supervision of Friar Iacopo Talenti in 1360. A series of gothic arcades were added to the façade, which were intended to contain sarcophagi. The Renaissance Florentine painter Domenico Ghirlandaio is buried in one of them.

== Façade ==
Santa Maria Novella's Romano-Gothic facade is considered one of the most important architectural works of the Florentine Renaissance, even though the lower section was started in 1350 and was finally completed in 1920.

In 1350, the lower front section was covered in white marble and what is commonly called green "marble" from Prato, which is really the green rock serpentinite and is therefore called 'serpentino' marble. The work is believed to have been financed by Turino del Baldese. Its design was certainly influenced by the façade of the Baptistery of Saint John; believed by scholars to have been built in the 11th or 12th century.

Progress was interrupted for over one hundred years until the Florentine architect Leon Battista Alberti was commissioned by the wool merchant Giovanni di Paolo Rucellai to design the upper part of the façade as well as other additions in the lower section, a work that was completed in 1470.

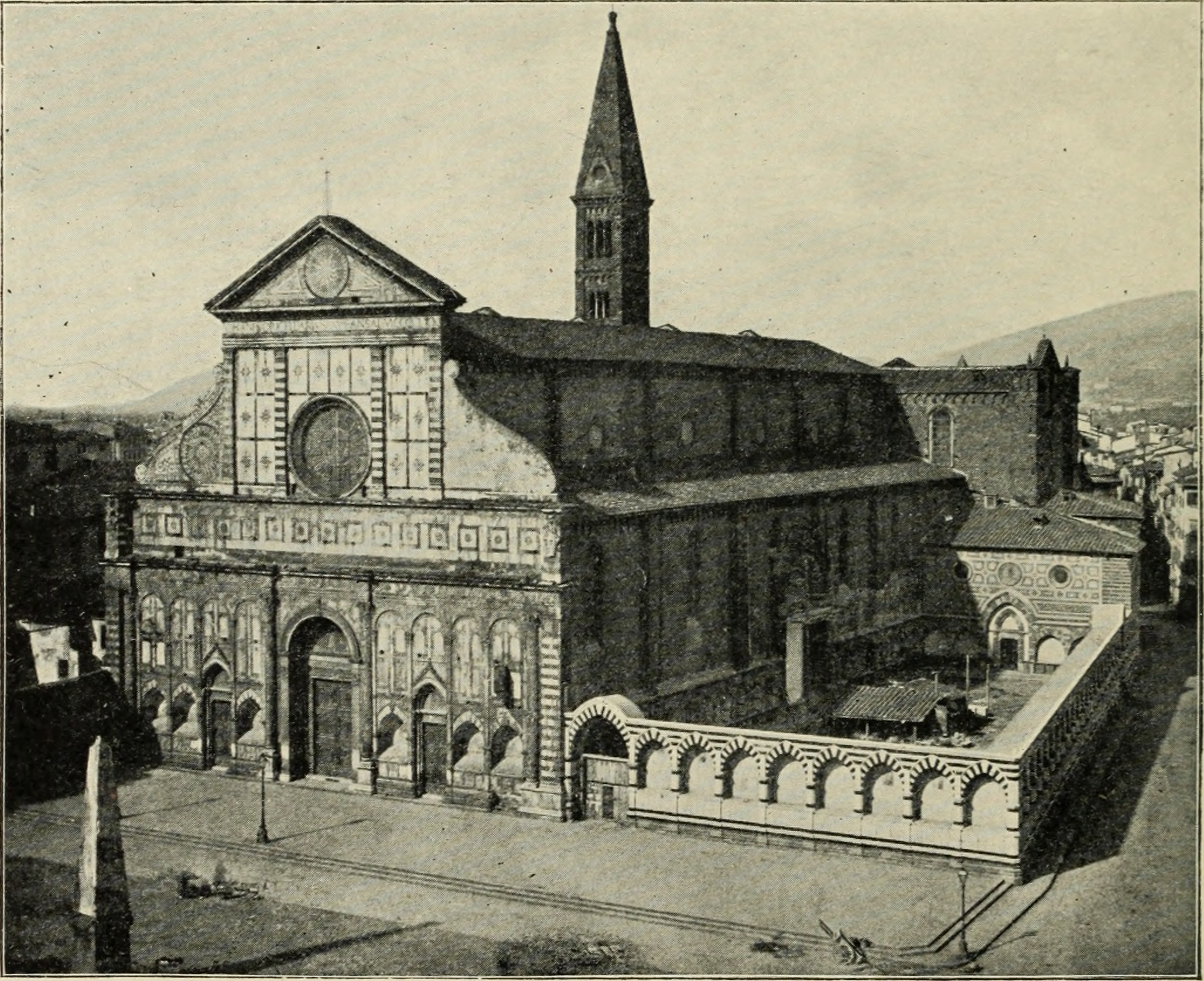
Photo from the early 20th century.

Alberti wanted to bring the ideals of classically inspired proportion and detailing to bear on the design, while also creating harmony with the existing lower part of the façade.

In ascending vertical order, Alberti's contributions include:

- Four columns with Corinthian capitals on the lower part of the façade.
- A broad frieze decorated with squares, inscribed with the name of the patron: Iohan(n)es Oricellarius Pau(li) f(ilius) An(no) Sal(utis) MCCCCLXX ('Giovanni Rucellai son of Paolo in the year of salvation 1470').
- A pediment with a round window, with the emblem of the Dominican order. The pediment has four striped pilasters.
- Large, S-shaped scrolls on the corners of each pediment, innovative elements which had no precedent in arquitecture. They solved a longstanding architectural problem of how to elegantly integrate a wide base to a narrower upper section. Variations inspired by Alberti's scrolls can be found in churches all over Italy.

=== Renovations ===
The church interiors were conditioned to host the Council of Florence (1439–1441), as the church was were all the sessions where held.

Commissioned in 1567 by Grand Duke Cosimo I, Giorgio Vasari conducted the first remodeling of the church, which included removing its original choir screen and adding six chapels between the columns, which required shortening the Gothic windows.

Between 1575 and 1577, the Gaddi chapel was built by Giovanni Antonio Dosio. Further renovations took place between 1858 and 1860 led by the architect Enrico Romoli.

A major restoration was carried out in 1999 in preparation for the Great Jubilee of 2000 and a subsequent restoration of the façade was carried out from April 2006 to March 2008.

Exterior Views

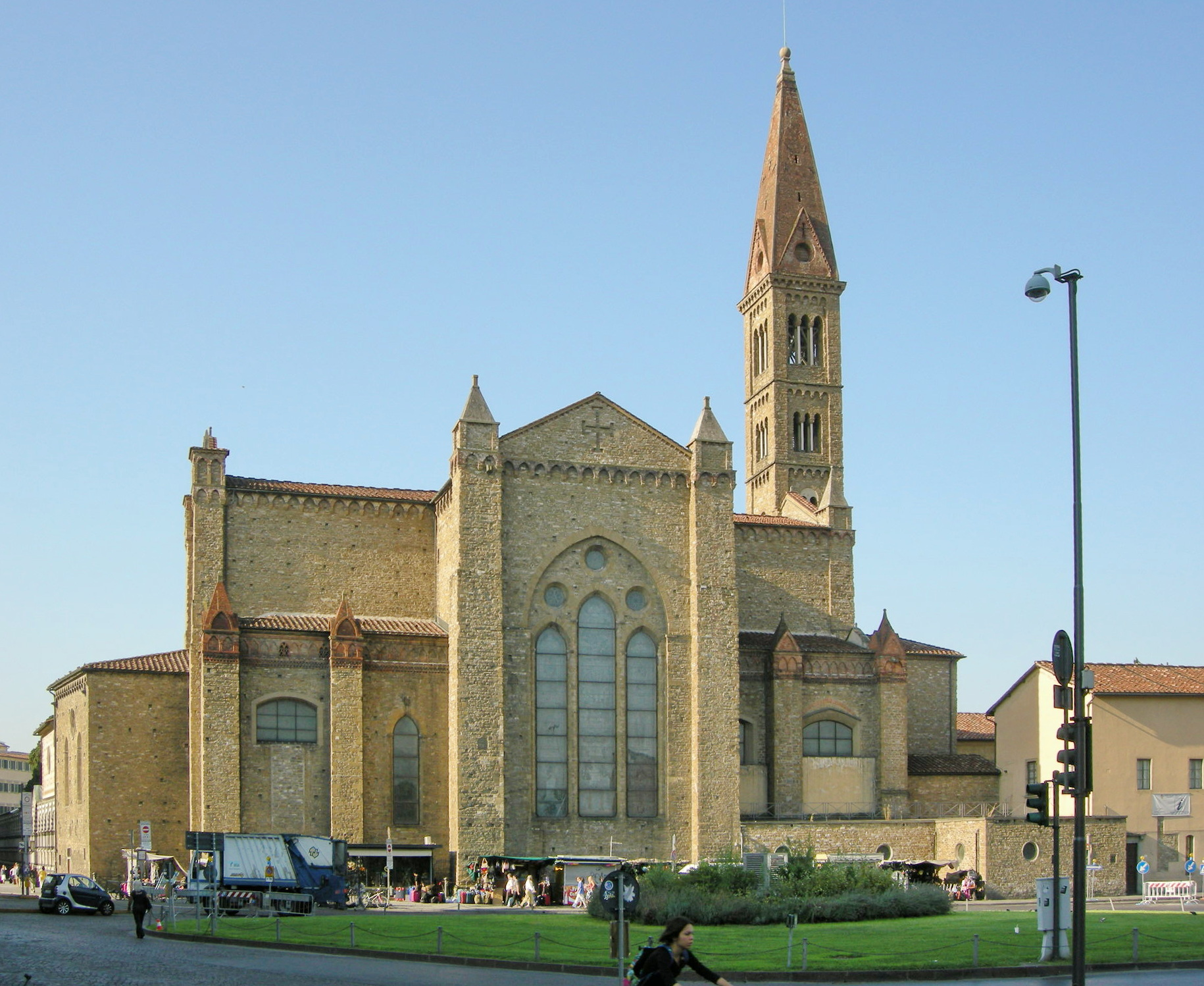
View of the apse from Piazza della Stazione.

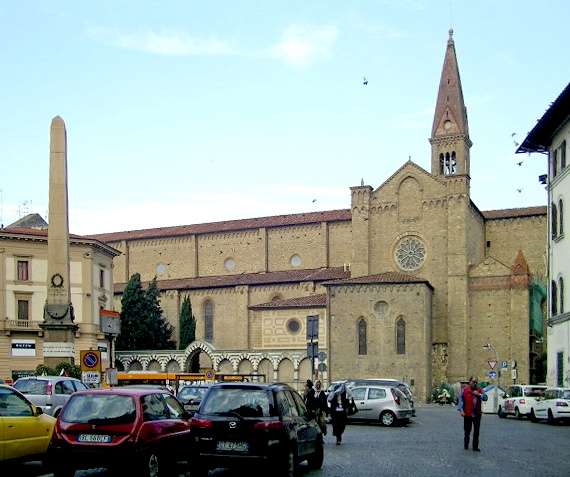
Side view from Piazza Unità d'Italia.

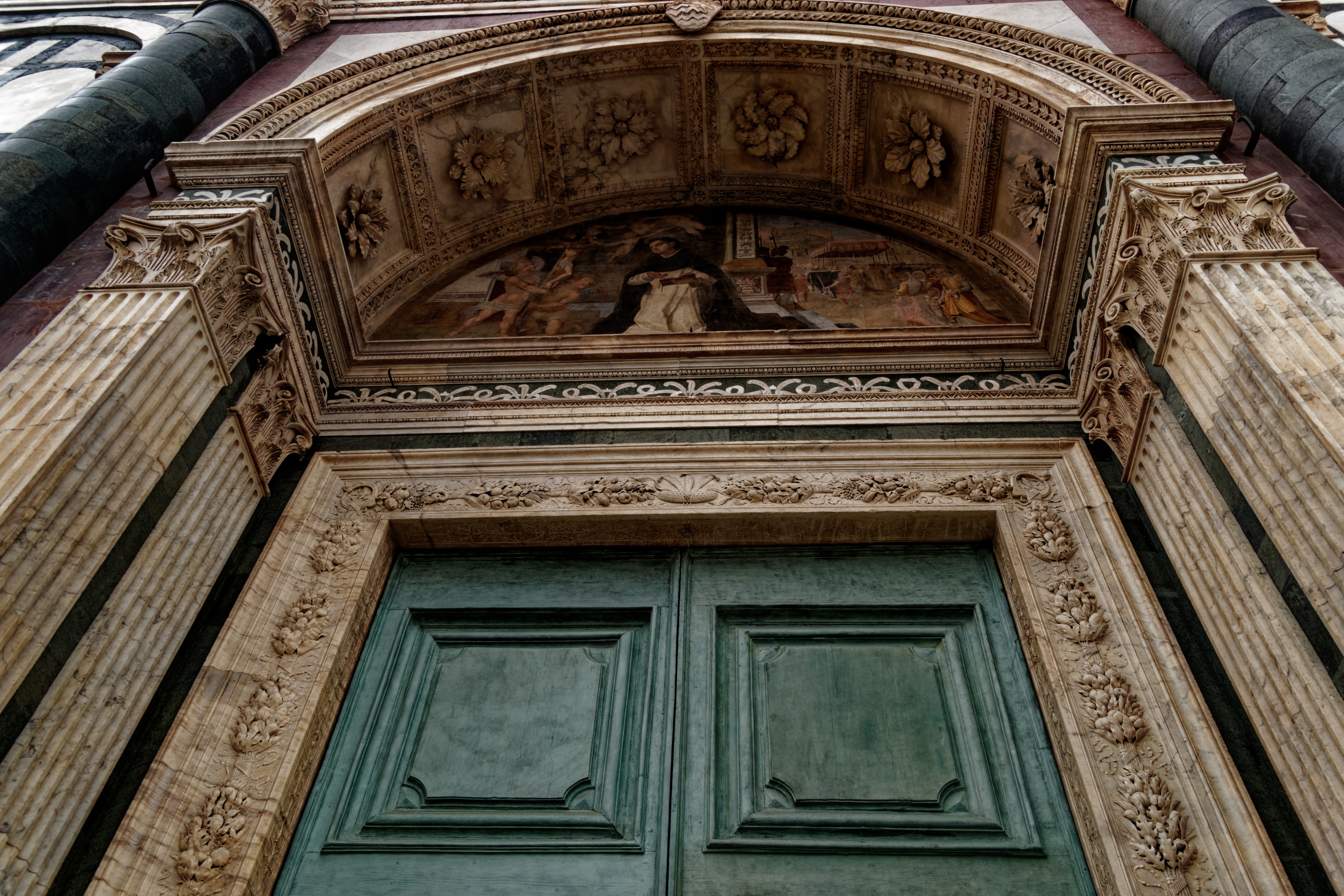
Tympanum above main door.

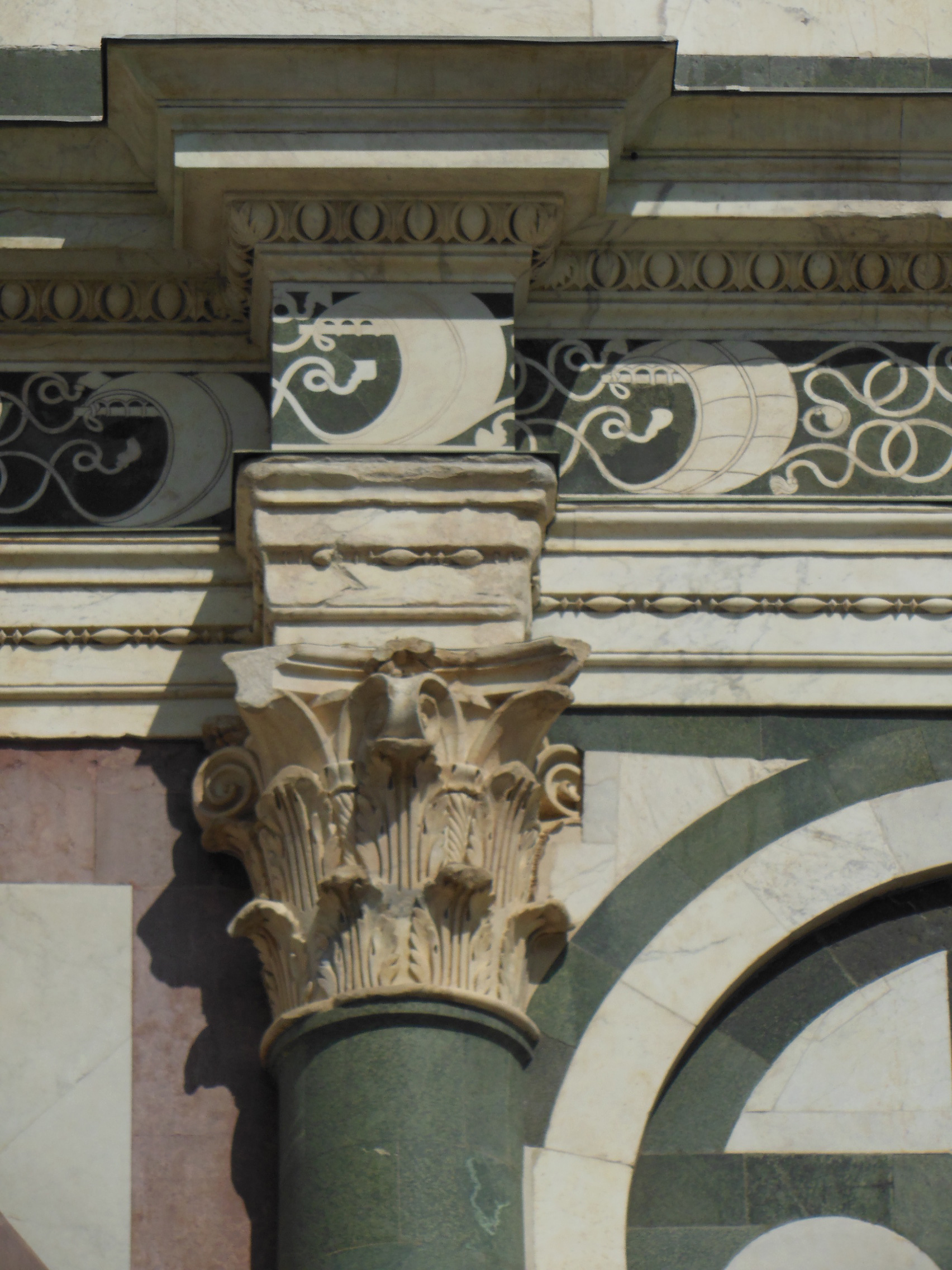
Corynthian columns

=== Astronomical instruments ===
An armillary sphere (on the left) and an astronomical quadrant with gnomon (on the right) were added to the end blind arches of the lower façade by Ignazio Danti, astronomer of Cosimo I, in 1572. The armilliary sphere was intended to determine the vernal equinox and this was observed for the first time publicly in 1574. The gnomon threw shadows on the astronomical quadrant to tell the time according to the transalpine, Italian and Bohemian methods.

Thanks to these instruments, the astronomer was able to calculate exactly the discrepancy between the true solar year and the Julian calendar, then still in use since its promulgation in 46 BC. By demonstrating his studies in Rome to Pope Gregory XIII, he helped obtain the realignment of the date of Easter and the promulgation of the new Gregorian calendar.

Danti also placed a hole in the south facing circular window at a height of 21 metres (69 ft) and installed a meridian line on the floor of the church as a better method of determining the equinoxes than the armilliary sphere. However, the construction was not completed due to the death of his patron, the Grand Duke Cosimo I.

Astronomical instruments in the façade

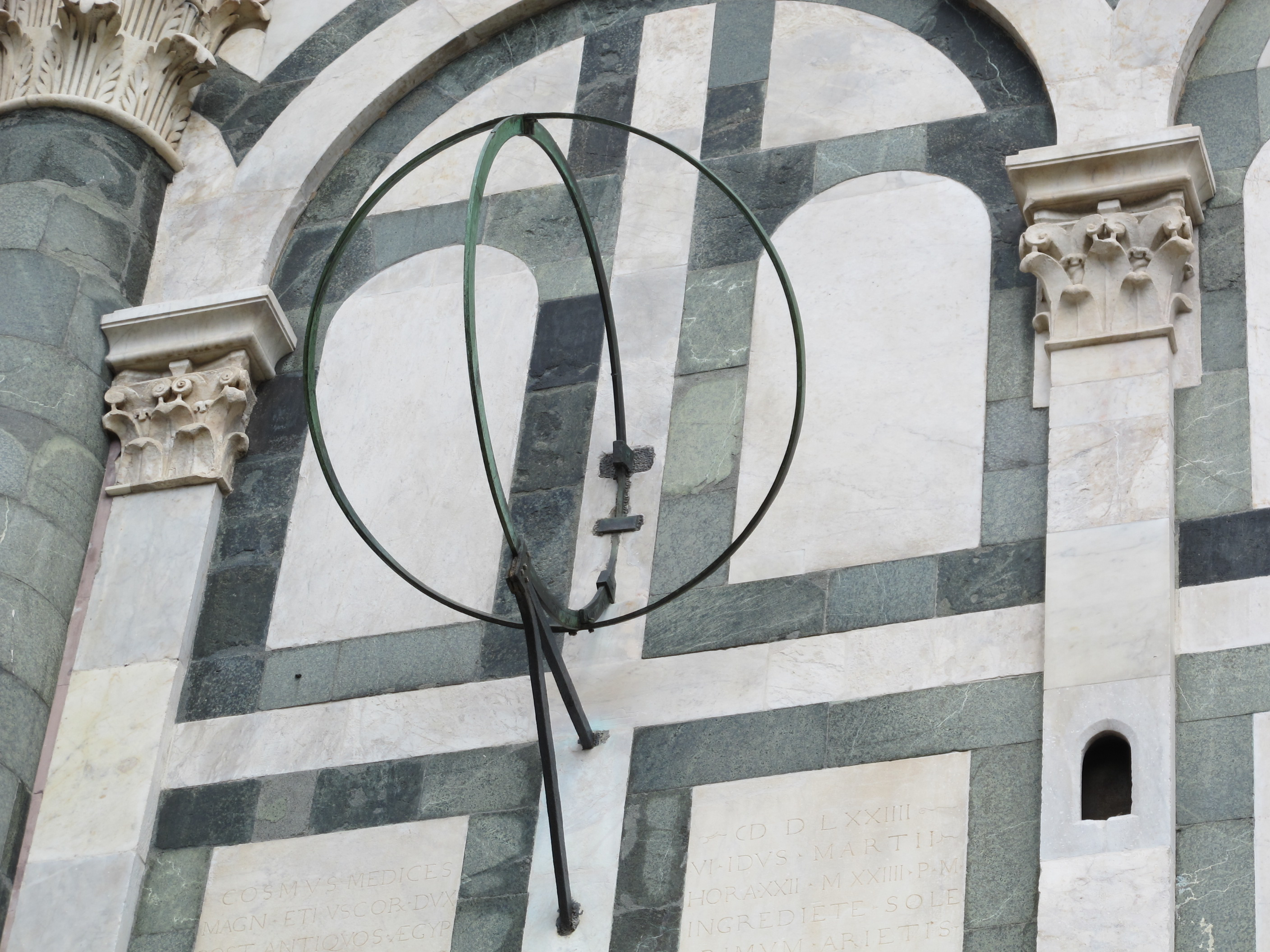
The armillary sphere

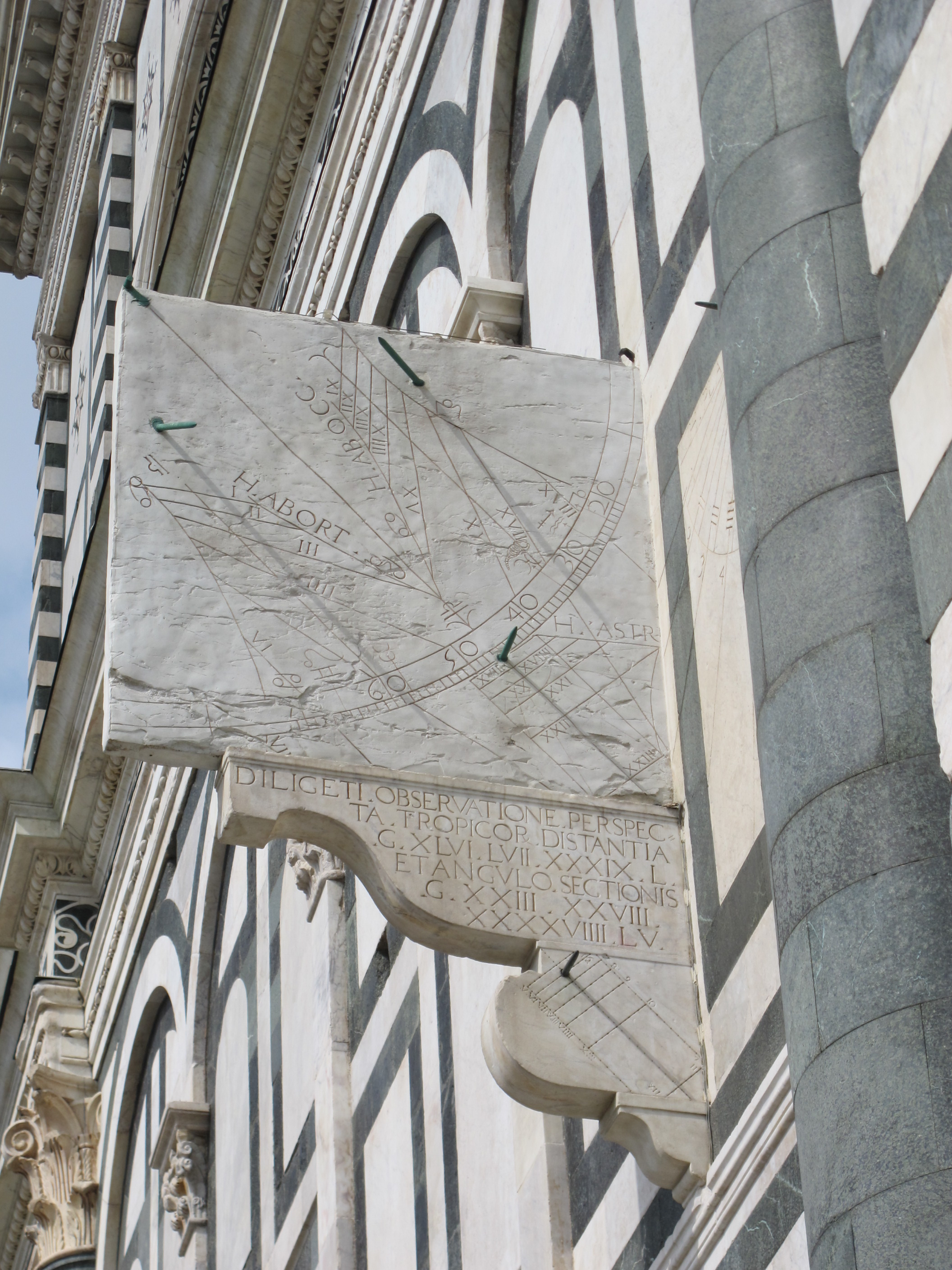
The gnomon

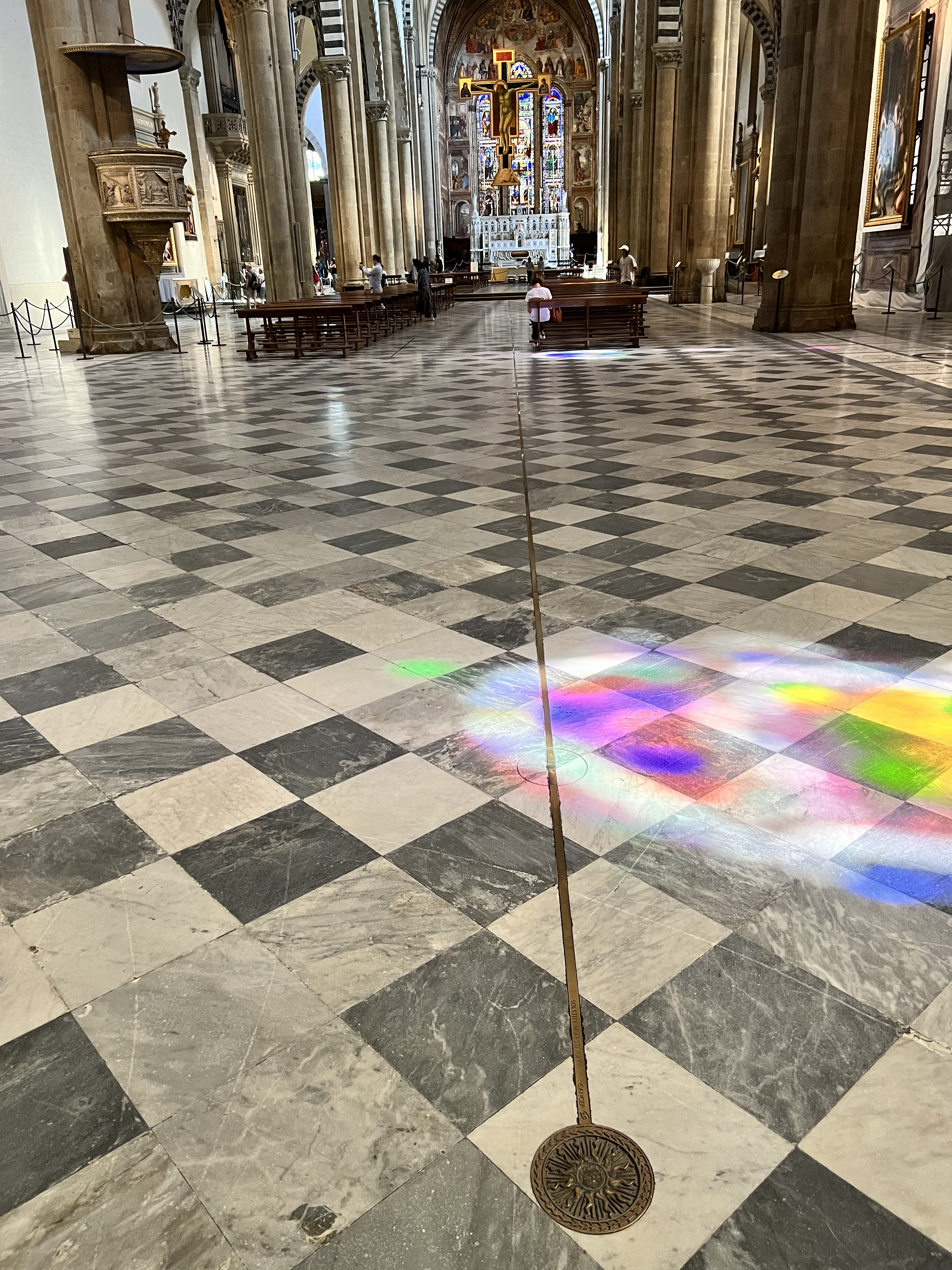
The meridian line

== Interior ==
The vast interior is based on a basilica plan, designed as a T-shaped Egyptian cross and is divided into a nave, two aisles set with windows and a short transept. The large nave is 100 metres long and gives an impression of austerity. The piers are of compound form and have Corinthian columns supporting pointed Gothic arches above which is a clerestory of ocular windows above which rises a ribbed, pointed quadrupartite vault. The ribs and arches are all black and white polychrome.

There is a trompe-l'œil effect by which towards the apse the nave seems longer than its actual length because the piers between the nave and the aisles are progressively closer, nearer to the chancel.

Many of the windows have stained glass dating from the 14th and 15th century, such as 15th century Madonna and Child and St. John and St. Philip (designed by Filippino Lippi), both in the Strozzi Chapel. Some stained glass windows have been damaged in the course of centuries and have been replaced. The one at the west end, a depiction of the Coronation of Mary, dates from the 14th century, and is based on a design of Andrea di Bonaiuto da Firenze.

The pulpit, commissioned by the Rucellai family in 1443, was designed by Filippo Brunelleschi and executed by his adopted son Andrea Cavalcanti. This pulpit has a particular historical significance, since it was the pulpit from which Father Tommaso Caccini denounced Galileo Galilei's defense of Copernican heliocentrism.

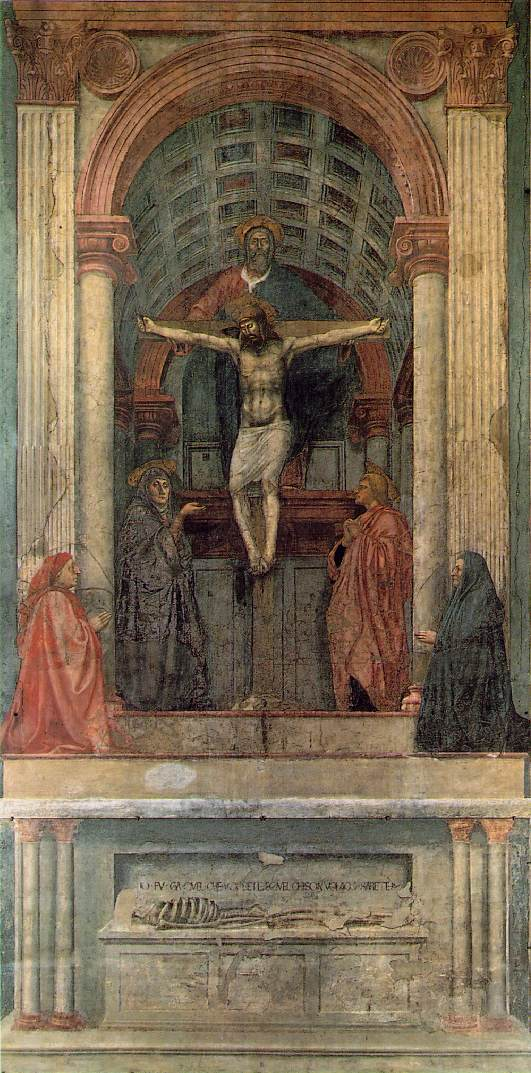
The Holy Trinity by Masaccio

The Holy Trinity, situated almost halfway along the left aisle, is a pioneering early Renaissance work of Masaccio, showing his new ideas about perspective and mathematical proportions. Its meaning for the art of painting can easily be compared to the importance of Brunelleschi for architecture and Donatello for sculpture. The patrons were the judge and his wife, members of the Lenzi family, here depicted kneeling. The cadaver tomb below carries in Italian the epigram: "I was once what you are, and what I am you will become".

Of particular note in the right aisle is the Tomba della Beata Villana, a monument by Bernardo Rossellino executed in 1451. In the same aisle, are located tombs of bishops of Fiesole, one by Tino di Camaino and another by Nino Pisano.

=== Tornabuoni Chapel ===
The chancel (or the Cappella Tornabuoni) contains series of famous frescoes painted from 1485 to 1490 by Domenico Ghirlandaio whose apprentice was the young Michelangelo. The frescoes represent themes from the lives of the Virgin and John the Baptist. They contain portrayals of several members of important Florentine families. The vaults have roundels with paintings of the Evangelists. On the rear wall are the paintings Saint Dominic Burns the Heretical Books and Saint Peter's Martyrdom, the Annunciation, and Saint John Goes into the Desert.

The stained-glass windows were made in 1492 by the Florentine artist Alessandro Agolanti, known also as Il Bidello, and were based on cartoons by Ghirlandaio.

The bronze crucifix on the main altar is by Giambologna (16th century).

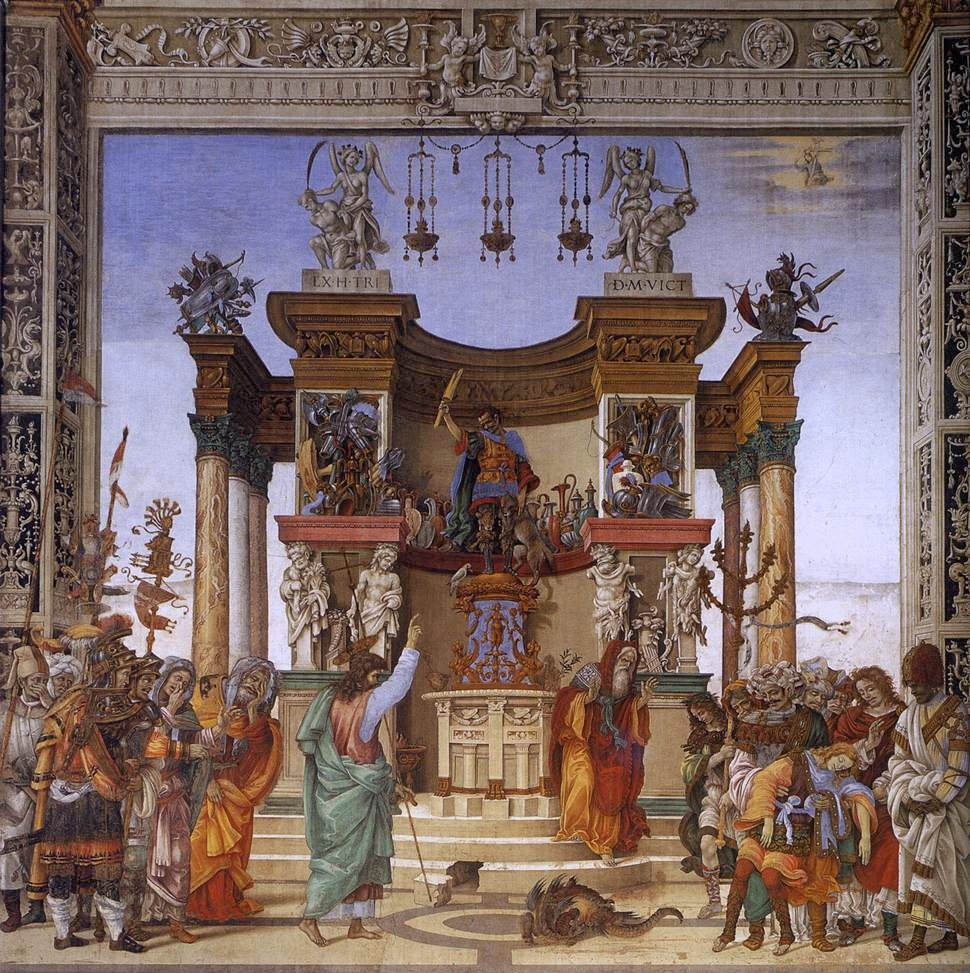
Filippino Lippi, Filippo Strozzi Chapel (1486–1502)

=== Filippo Strozzi Chapel ===
The Filippo Strozzi Chapel is situated on the right side of the main altar. The series of frescoes by Filippino Lippi depict the lives of Apostle Philip and the Apostle Saint James the Great and were completed in 1502. On the right wall is the fresco St Philip Driving the Dragon from the Temple of Hieropolis and in the lunette above it, the Crucifixion of St Philip. On the left wall is the fresco St John the Evangelist Resuscitating Druisana and in the lunette above it The Torture of St John the Evangelist. Adam, Noah, Abraham and Jacob are represented on the ribbed vault. Behind the altar is the tomb of Strozzi with a sculpture by Benedetto da Maiano (1491).

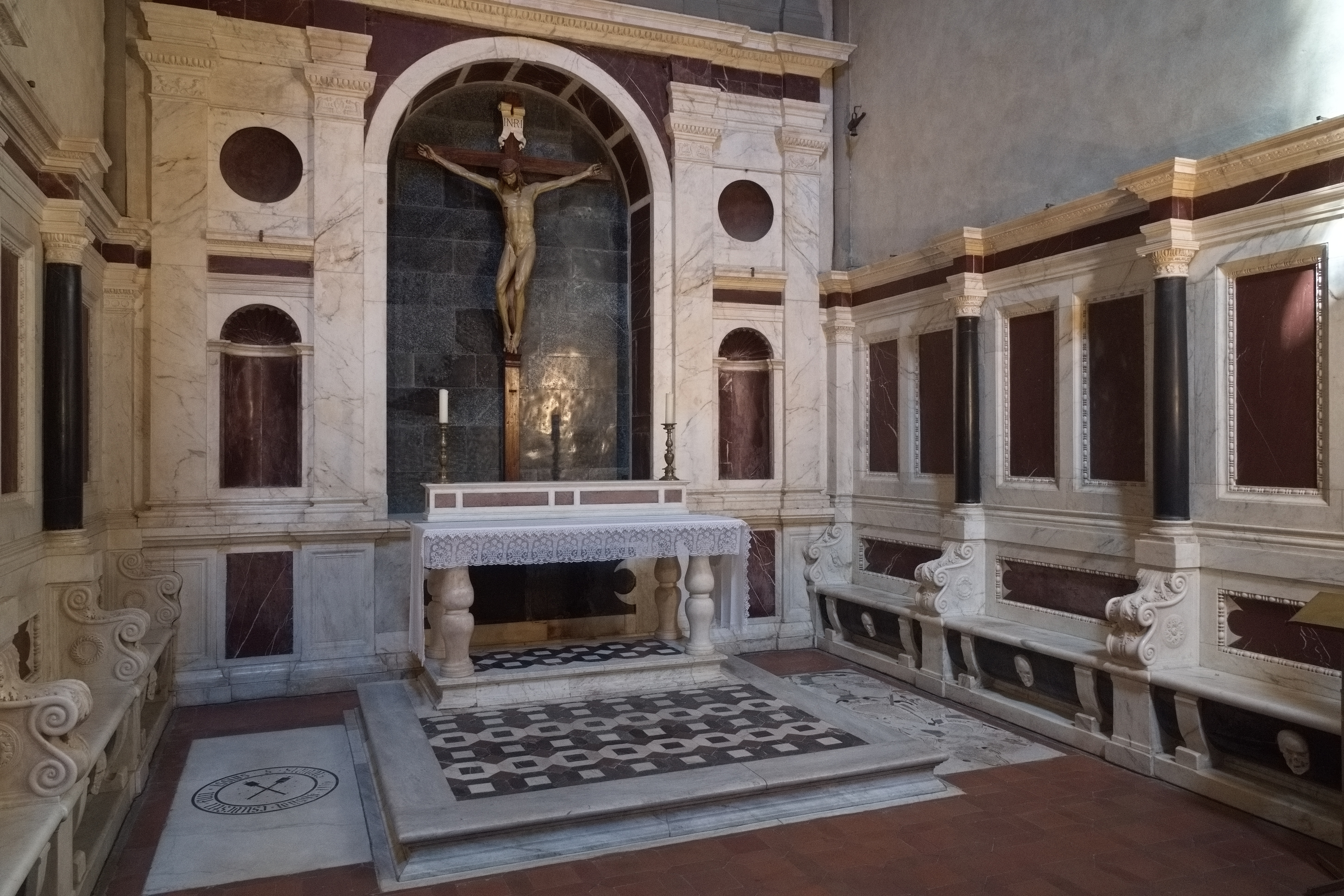
Gondi Chapel with Brunelleschi's crucifix (c. 1410)

=== Gondi Chapel ===
This chapel is situated on the left side of the main altar and dates back to the end of the 13th century, when on the day of Saint Luke, on 18. October 1279, the groundbreaking for the church took place. The vault contains fragments of frescoes by 13th-century Greek painters. Today's Renaissance appearance in white and black marble, and red porphyry revetment was applied by Giuliano da Sangallo around 1503, when the patronage for the chapel went to the Gondi family.

Here, on the rear wall in the niche above the altar the famous Crucifix by Brunelleschi was installed, though not its original location. The polychromed wooden statue executed ca. 1410–15 is one of very few sculptures by the artist most famous for the cathedral's cupola and the foundling hospital. The legend goes that he was so disgusted by the "primitive" Crucifix by his young friend Donatello in the Florence's church of Santa Croce who challenged him to cut a better one. The stained-glass window are modern works of the 20th century.

=== Cappella Strozzi di Mantova ===
The Cappella Strozzi di Mantova is situated at the end of the left transept. The frescoes were commissioned from Nardo di Cione (1350–1357) by Tommaso Strozzi, an ancestor of Filippo Strozzi. The frescoes are inspired by Dante's Divine Comedy: Last Judgment (on the back wall; including a portrait of Dante), Hell (on the right wall) and paradise (on the left wall). The main altarpiece of The Redeemer with the Madonna and Saints was done by Nardo di Cione's brother, Andrea di Cione, better known as Orcagna. The large stained-glass window on the back was made from a cartoon by the two brothers.

=== Della Pura Chapel ===
The Della Pura Chapel is situated north of the old cemetery. It dates from 1474 and was constructed with Renaissance columns. It was restored in 1841 by Gaetano Baccani. On the left side there is a lunette with a 14th-century fresco Madonna and Child with St Catherine. On the front altar there is a wooden crucifix by Baccio da Montelupo (1501).

=== Rucellai Chapel ===
The Rucellai Chapel, at the end of the right aisle, dates from the 14th century. Besides the tomb of Paolo Rucellai (15th century) and the marble statue of the Madonna and the Child by Nino Pisano, it houses several art treasures such as remains of frescoes by the Maestro di Santa Cecilia (end 13th – beginning 14th century). The panel on the left wall, the Martyrdom of St Catherine, was painted by Giuliano Bugiardini (possibly with assistance from Michelangelo). The bronze tomb, in the centre of the floor, was made by Lorenzo Ghiberti in 1425.

=== Bardi Chapel ===
The Bardi Chapel, the second chapel on the right of the apse, was founded by Riccardo Bardi and dates from early 14th century. The high-relief on a pillar on the right depicts St Gregory blessing Riccardo Bardi. The walls show us some early 14th-century frescoes attributed to Spinello Aretino. The Madonna del Rosario on the altar is by Giorgio Vasari (1568)

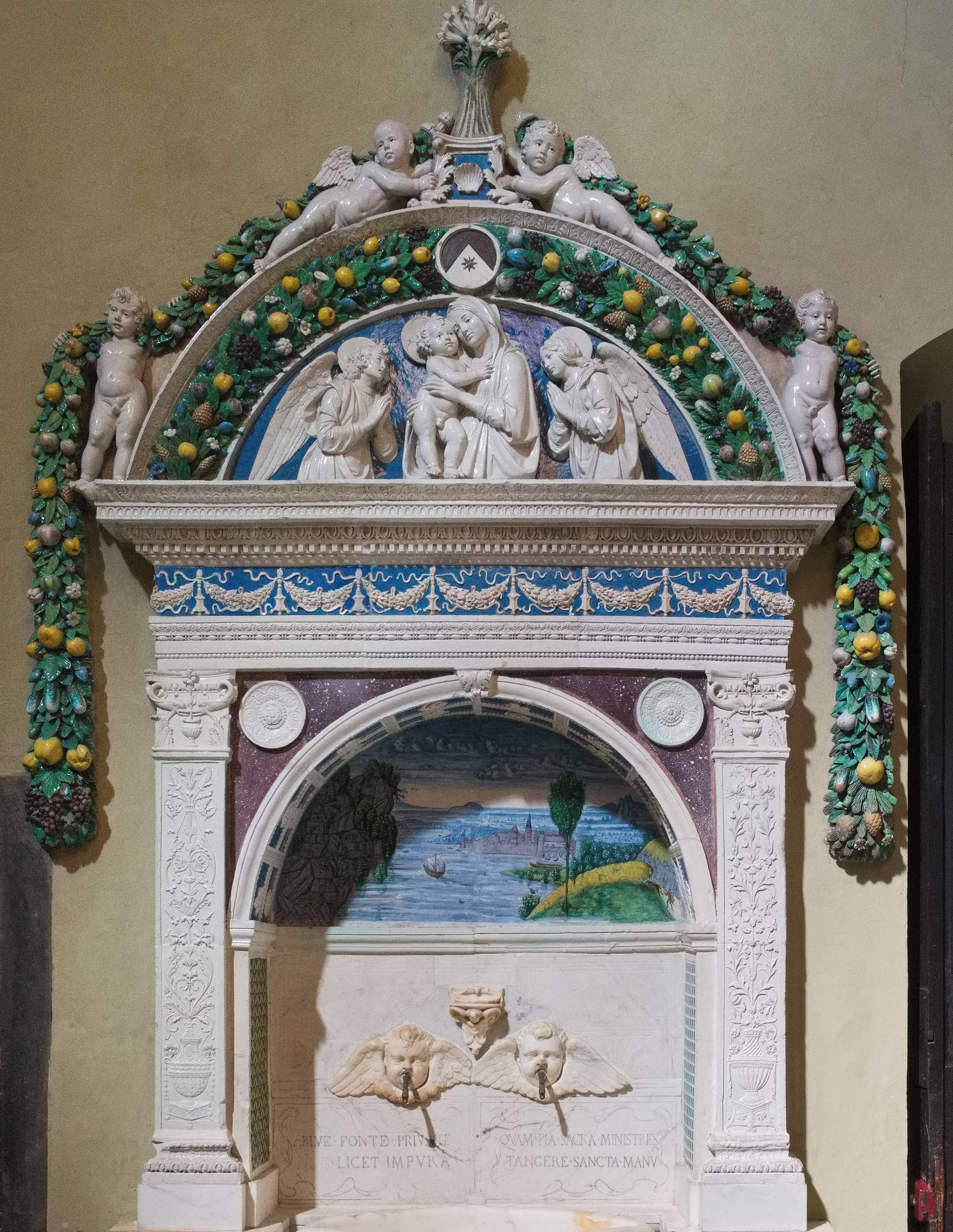
Lavabo in the former sacristy by Giovanni della Robbia (1498–99)

=== Sacristy ===
The sacristy, at the end of the left aisle, was built as the Chapel of the Annunciation by the Cavalcanti family in 1380. It houses, after a recent period of fourteen years of cleaning and renovation, the enormous painted Crucifix with the Madonna and John the Evangelist, an early work by Giotto. The sacristy is also embellished by a glazed terracotta and marble font, a masterpiece by Giovanni della Robbia (1498). The cupboards were designed by Bernardo Buontalenti in 1593. The paintings on the wall are ascribed to Vasari and other contemporary Florentine painters. The large Gothic window with three mullions at the back wall dates from 1386 and was based on cartoons by Niccolò di Pietro Gerini.

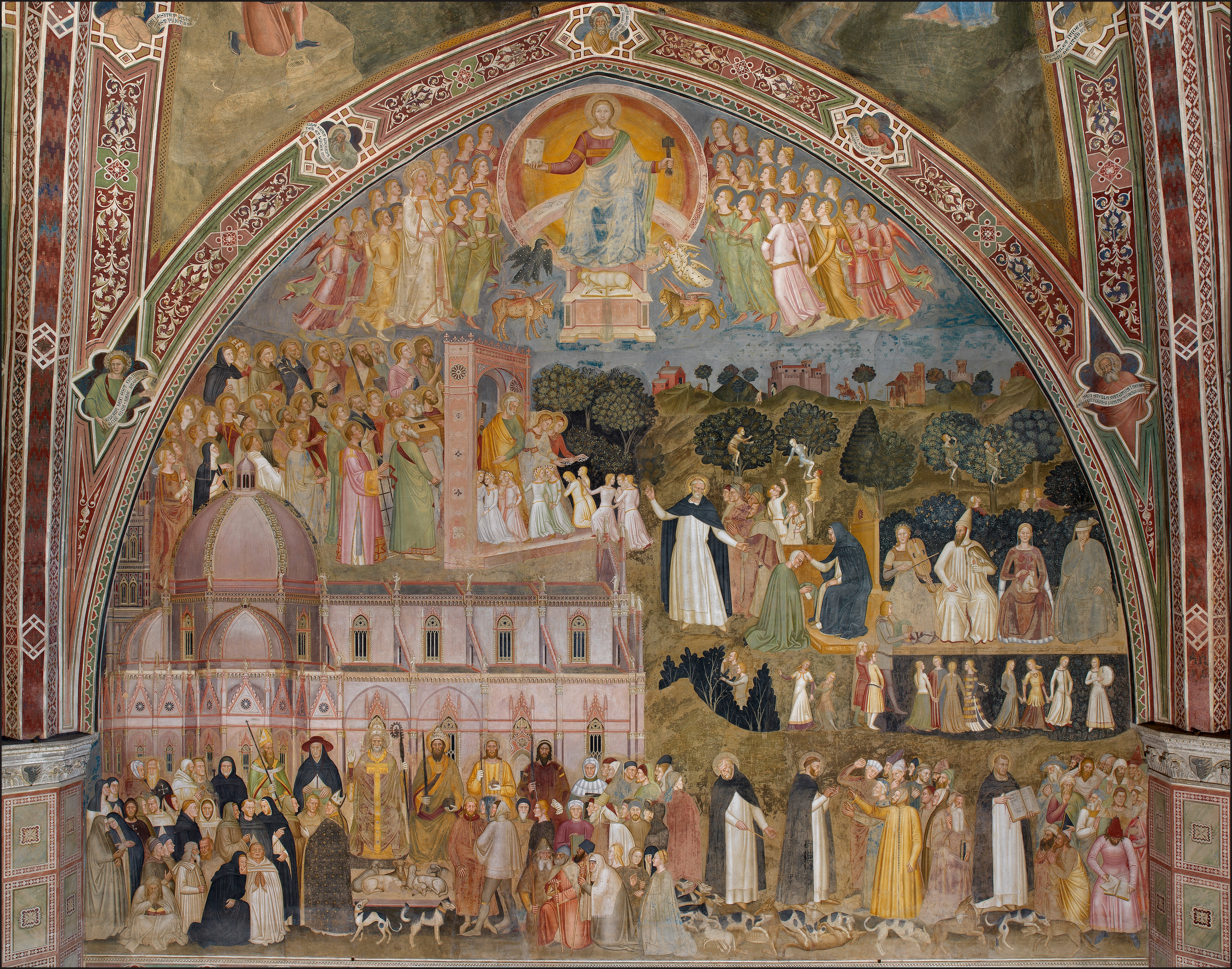
Fresco by Andrea di Bonaiuto da Firenze in the Spanish Chapel: Allegory of the Active and Triumphant Church and of the Dominican order (c. 1365)

=== Spanish Chapel ===
The Spanish Chapel (or Cappellone degli Spagnoli) is the former chapter house of the convent. It is situated at the north side of the green Cloister (chiostro verde). It was commissioned by Buonamico (Mico) Guidalotti as a chapter house for the Dominican Order. Construction started c. 1343 and was finished in 1355. The Guidalotti chapel was later called "Spanish Chapel", because Cosimo I assigned it to Eleonora of Toledo and her Spanish retinue. Within the Spanish Chapel there is a smaller Chapel of the Most Holy Sacrament.

The Spanish Chapel was decorated from 1365 to 1367 by Andrea di Bonaiuto, also known as Andrea da Firenze. As the chapel was built for the Dominicans, depictions of Saint Dominic are found in most of the frescos. The large fresco on the right wall depicts an Allegory of the Active and Triumphant Church and of the Dominican order. It is especially interesting because in the background it shows a large pink building that some think may provide some insight into the original designs for Florence Cathedral by Arnolfo di Cambio (before Brunelleschi's dome was built). However, such an interpretation is fantasy since the Duomo was never intended to be pink, nor to have the bell tower at the rear. This fresco also contains portraits of pope Benedict IX, cardinal Friar Niccolò Albertini, count Guido di Poppi, Arnolfo di Cambio and the poet Petrarch.

The frescoes on the other walls represent scenes from the lives of Christ and St Peter on the entry wall (mostly ruined due to the later installation of a choir), The Triumph of St Thomas Aquinas and the Allegory of Christian Learning on the left wall, and the large Crucifixion with the Way to Calvary and the Descent into Limbo on the archway of the altar wall.

The four-part vault contains scenes of Christ walking on water (the navicella), his Resurrection, the Ascension, and Pentecost. The five-panelled Gothic polyptych that was probably originally made for the chapel's altar, depicting the Madonna Enthroned with Child and Four Saints by Bernardo Daddi dates from 1344 and is currently on display in a small museum area reached ed through glass doors from the far end of the cloister. Together, the complex iconography of the ceiling vault, walls, and altar combine to communicate the message of Dominicans as guides to salvation.

Rectangular in shape, towards the west it has a scarsella containing the altar and a marble crucifix by Domenico Pieratti from the early seventeenth century, donated in 1731 by Gian Gastone de' Medici.

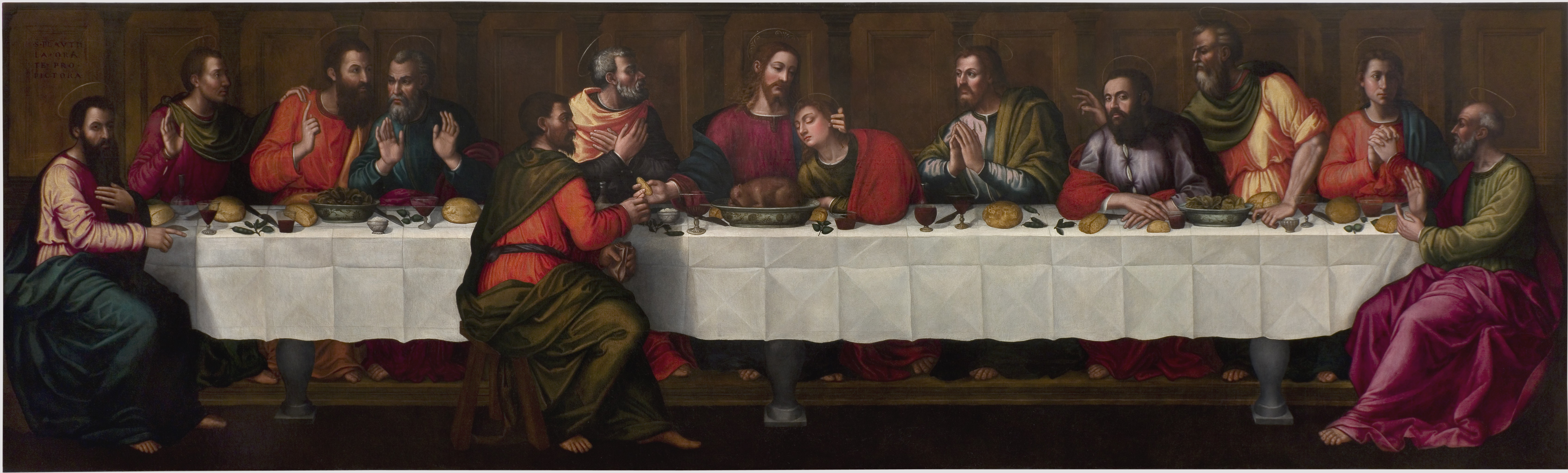
The Last Supper (Plautilla Nelli), is a 7x2-meter oil painting on canvas in the basilica.

The Spanish Chapel also contains the Last Supper, the only remaining example of the signed works of Plautilla Nelli, a Dominican nun.

Green Cloister frescos

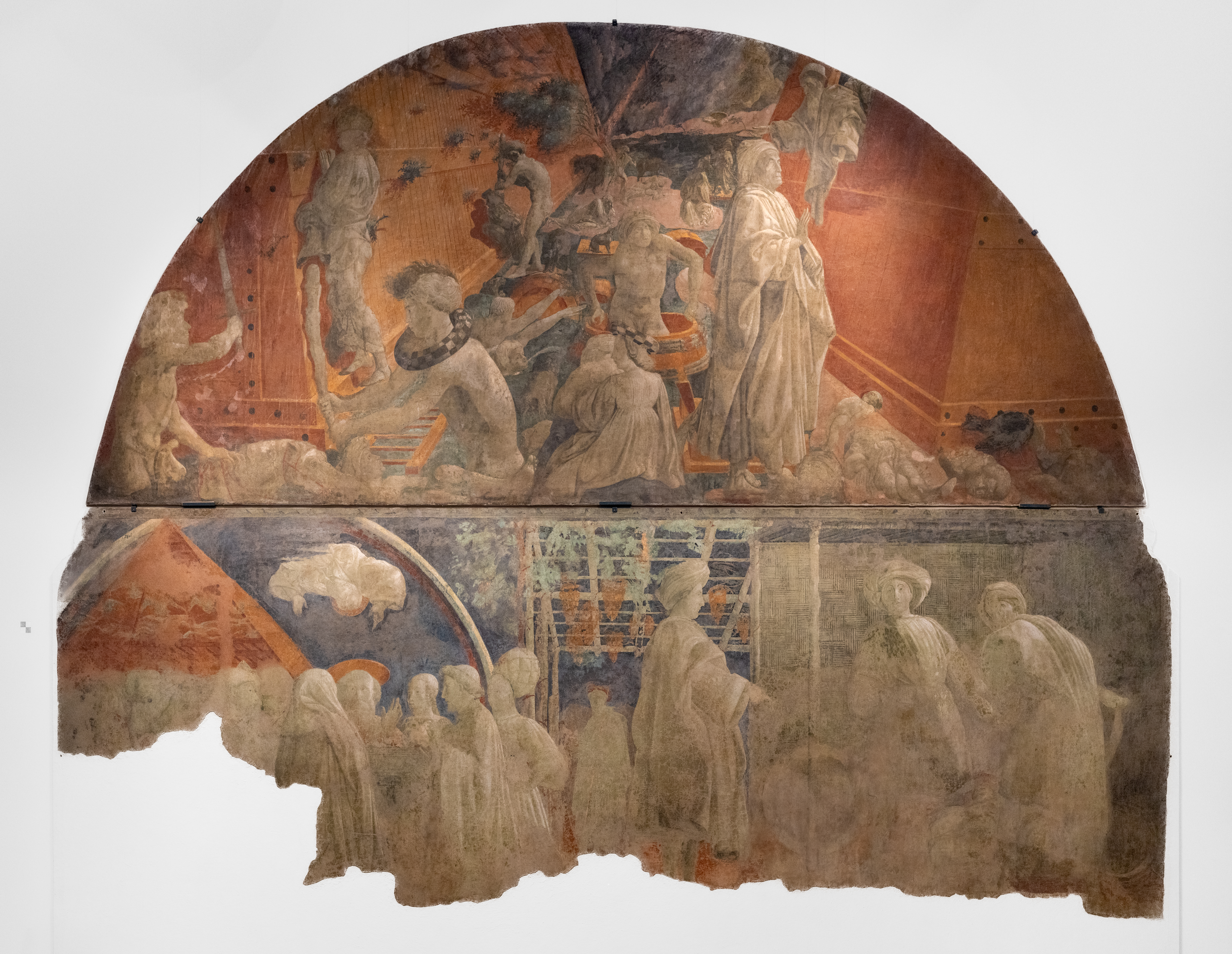
Paolo Uccello — Flood and Waters Subsiding, Sacrifice and Drunkenness

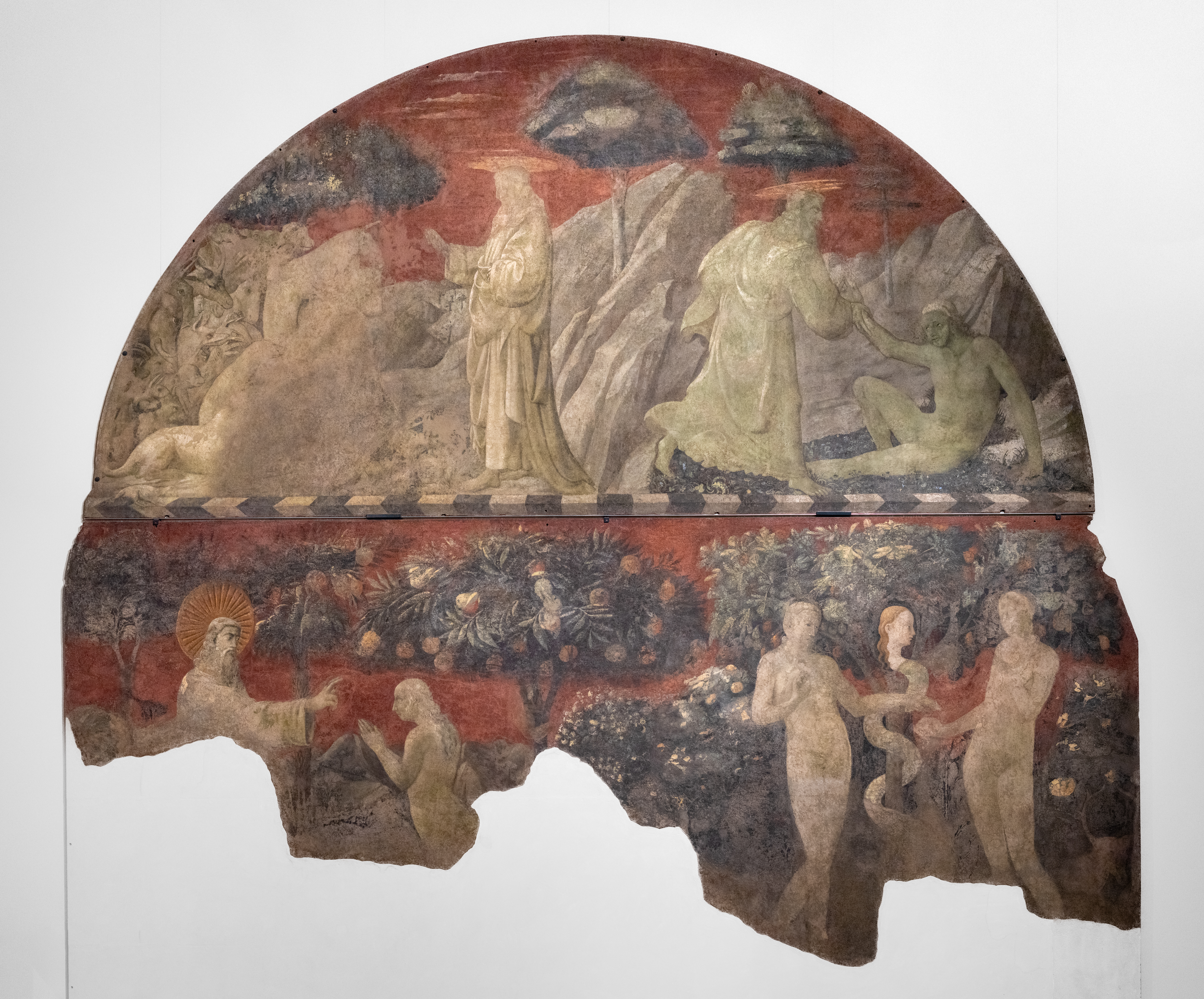
Paolo Uccello — Creation and the Fall

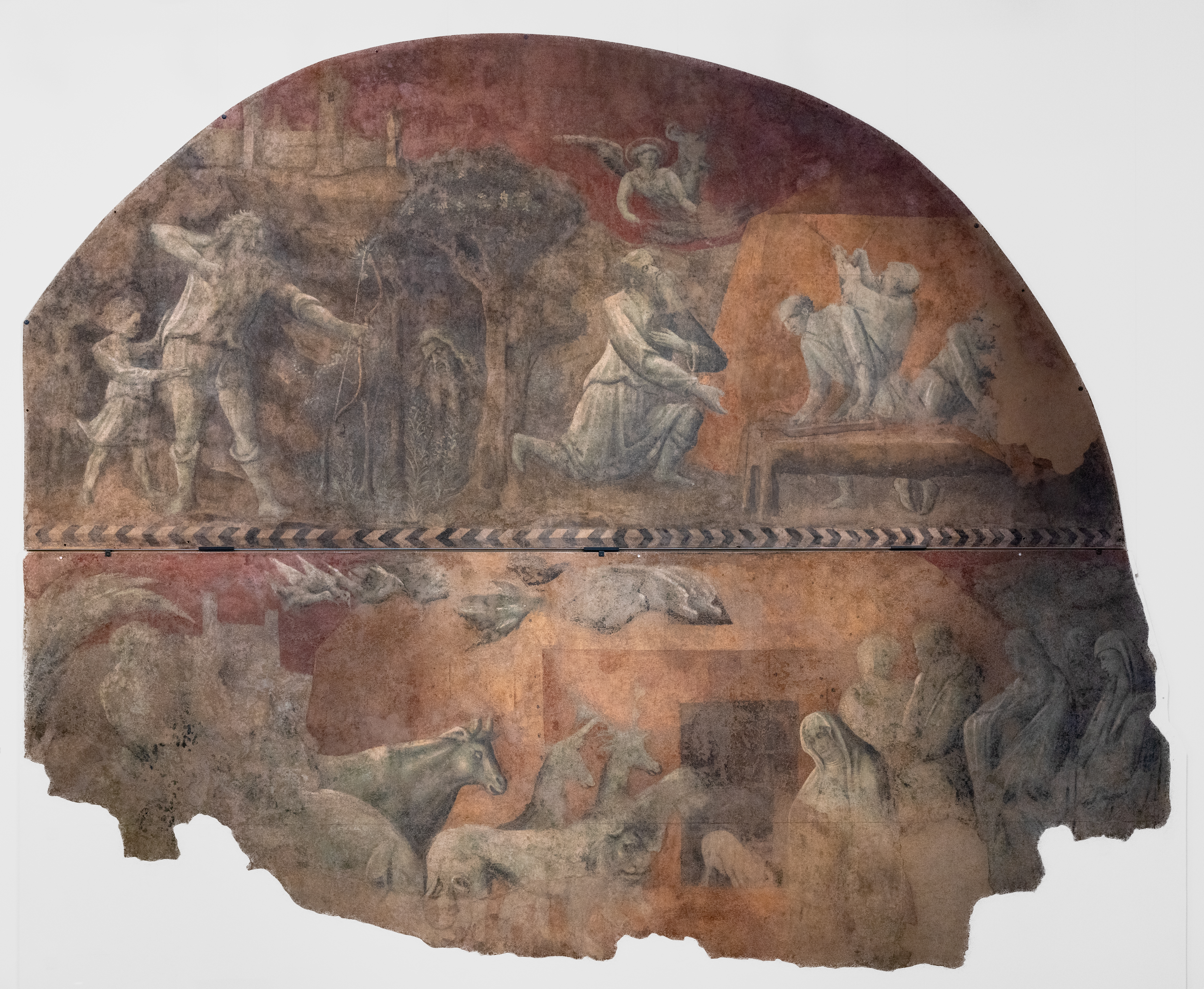
Paolo Uccello — Lamech killing his Father, Announcement of the Flood and the Building of the Ark

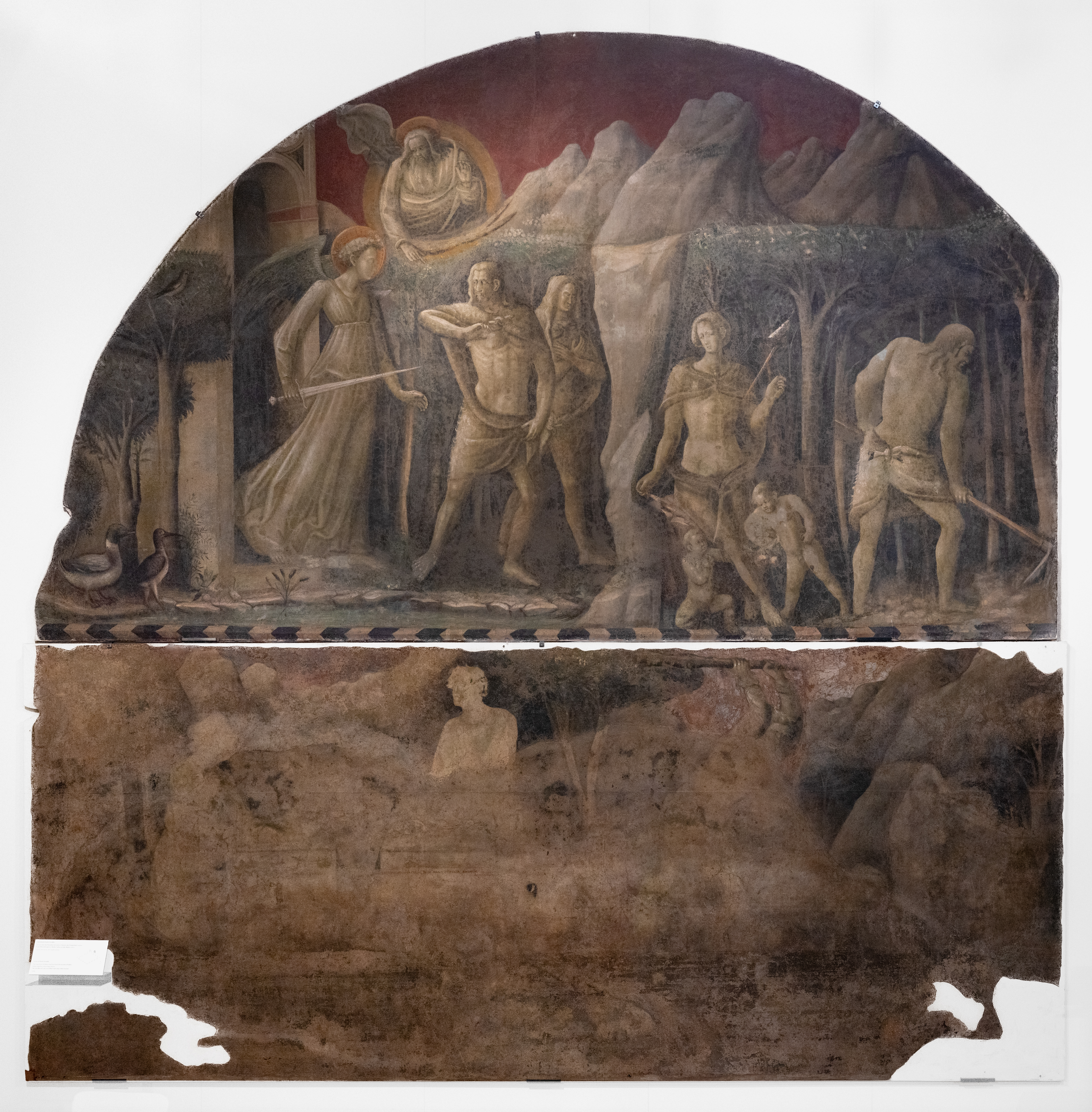
Paolo Uccello and his circle — Adam and Eve, Cain and Abel

=== Chariot Race in the Piazza ===
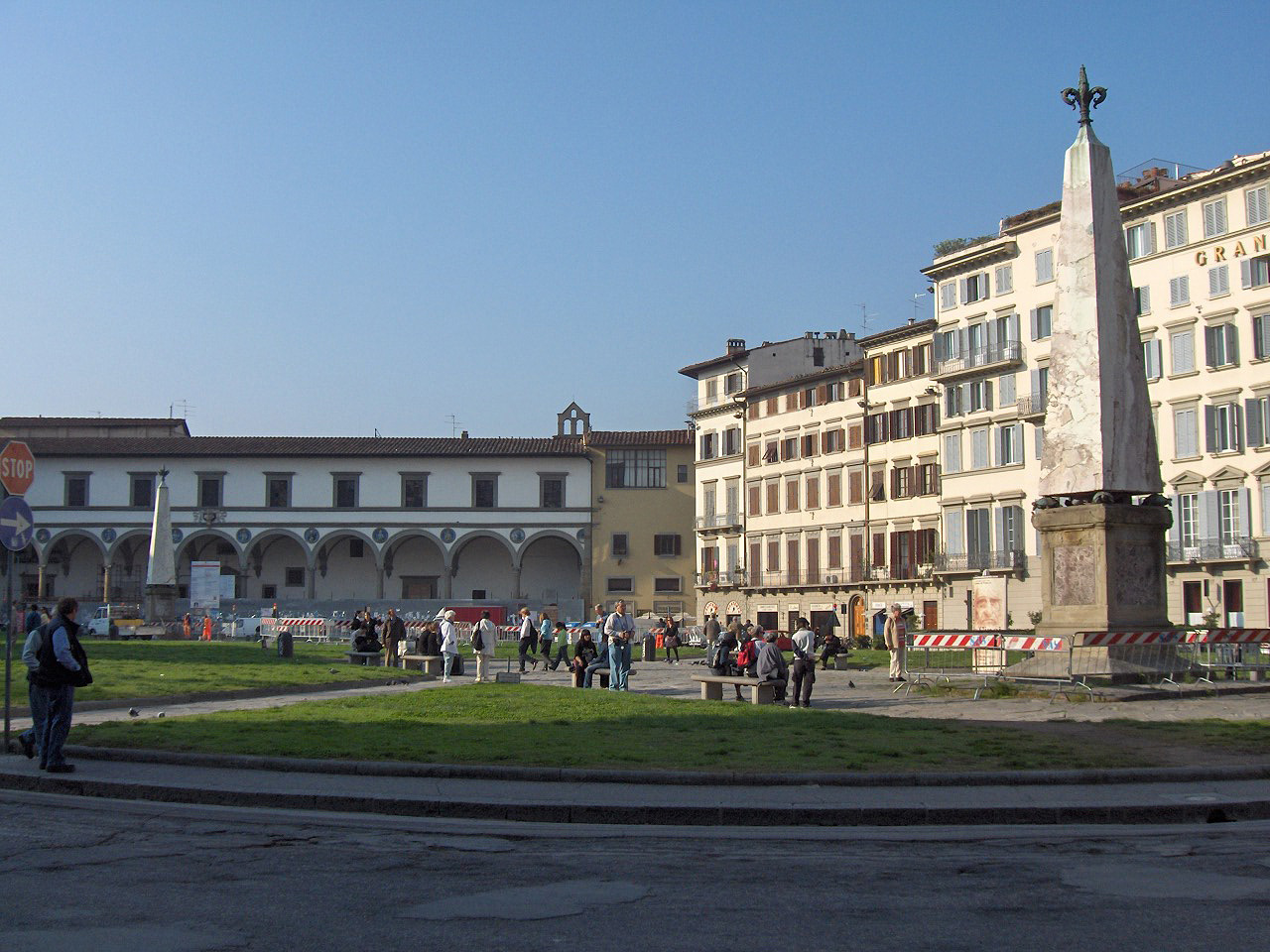
Piazza Santa Maria Novella

The square in front the church was used by Cosimo I for the yearly chariot race (Palio dei Cocchi).

This custom existed between 1563 and late in the 19th century. The two Obelisks of the Corsa dei Cocchi marked the start and the finish of the race. They were set up to imitate a Roman Circus Maximus. The obelisks rest on bronze tortoises, made in 1608 by the sculptor Giambologna.

== List of artworks ==
Artists who produced items for the church include:

- Baccio D'Agnolo – wood carvings
- Sandro Botticelli – Adoration of the Magi, early work above the entrance
- Bronzino – The Miracle of Jesus
- Filippo Brunelleschi – crucifix (between 1410 and 1425)
- Andrea Cavalcanti (called Il Buggiano) – marble reliefs of the chancel, with Scenes of the Life of the Virgin (15th ct.)
- Giuliano Bugiardini – Martyrdom of Saint Catherine of Alexandria, Cappella Rucellai
- Tino da Camaino – terracotta bust of St. Antoninus; tomb of the Bishop of Fiesole
- Andrea di Cione (called Orcagna) – Strozzi Altarpiece (1357), Cappella Strozzi di Mantova
- Nardo di Cione – frescoes of The Divine Judgment, design for the window by both brothers, Strozzi Chapel (1350s)
- Giovanni della Robbia – lavabo in the Sacristy, and Noli me tangere in the Chiostro dei Morti
- Duccio – Rucellai Madonna, now in the Uffizi
- Lorenzo Ghiberti – tomb slab of Leonardo Dati (1423)
- Domenico Ghirlandaio – frescoes in the Tornabuoni Chapel, design of the stained-glass window (late 15th century)
- Giotto – crucifix (1290)
- Filippino Lippi – frescoes in the Strozzi Chapel, depicting scenes of the life of Philip the Apostle; stained glass window
- Girolamo Macchietti – Martyrdom of Saint Laurence
- Benedetto da Maiano – tomb of Filippo Strozzi (1491) at the backside of the Strozzi Chapel
- Masaccio – Holy Trinity
- Michelangelo – small holy water font carried by a caryatid at the corner of the Sacristy
- Plautilla Nelli - Last Supper
- Nino Pisano – marble sculpture Madonna and Child (1368)
- Bernardo Rossellino – Monument to the Villana delle Botti (1451)
- Santi di Tito – Lazarus Raised from Death
- Paolo Uccello – Story of Noah, frescoes formerly in the Chiostro Verde, now in the refectory
- Giorgio Vasari – Madonna of the Rosary (1568)

== Notable prioresses ==
- Saint Agnes of Montepulciano

== List of burials ==
- Leonardo Dati (1425)
- Joseph II of Constantinople (1439)
- Domenico Ghirlandaio (1494)
- Niccolò Gaddi, cardinal (1552)

== See also ==
- Roman Catholic Marian churches
- Churches of Florence
- Late medieval domes

== Sources ==
- Devlin, Mary Aquinas (July 1929). "An English Knight of the Garter in the Spanish Chapel in Florence". Speculum. 4 (3): 270–281. doi:10.2307/2849550. JSTOR 2849550.
