= Arca di San Domenico =

Funerary structure in Bologna

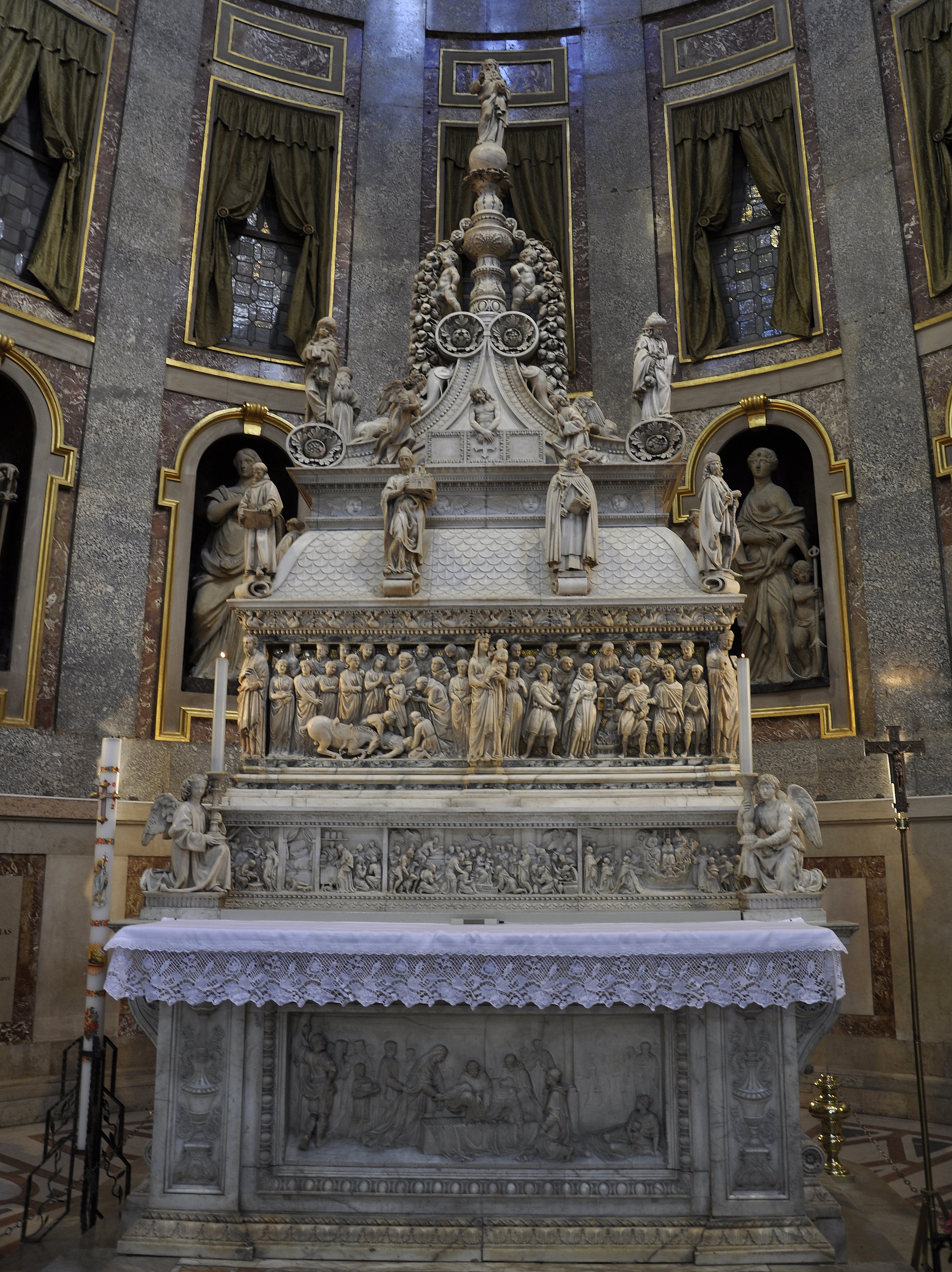
- General view of the Arca di San Domenico.
- Artist: Nicola Pisano, Niccolò dell'Arca, Michelangelo, Alfonso Lombardi, Guido Reni, ...
- Year: 1264-
- Location: 44.4895°N 11.3445°E

The Arca di San Domenico (Ark of Saint Dominic) is a monument containing the remains of Saint Dominic. It is located in Dominic's Chapel in the Basilica of San Domenico in Bologna, Italy.

== History ==
The elaboration of this artistic masterpiece was performed in separate stages by the best sculptors of their time and took almost 500 years to finish.

Saint Dominic died in the convent of the church of San Nicolò delle Vigne on 6 August 1221. He was buried behind the altar. The church of San Nicolò was expanded into the Basilica of San Domenico between 1228 and 1240. The remains of the saint were moved in 1233 from its place behind the altar into a simple marble sarcophagus, situated on the floor in the right aisle of the church for the faithful. Since most of the pilgrims, who came in great numbers to see the grave, were not able to see this shrine, hidden by so many people standing in front of it, the need was felt for a new shrine.

In 1264, the Dominicans then commissioned the sculptor Nicola Pisano to create a new tomb for their founder. Nicola had designed of the new tomb and had carved several figures for the principal side of the sarcophagus before he was called to Siena in 1265 to construct the pulpit for the cathedral. The arca was completed by his workshop assistants led by Lapo di Ricevuto. The rectangular sarcophagus was originally borne on caryatid figures. When the Ark was later redesigned, these supports were dispersed and are now tentatively identified in several museums: the archangels "Michael" and "Gabriel" (in the Victoria and Albert Museum, London), the statue "Faith" (Louvre, Paris), a group of three deacons (in the Bargello, Florence) and a similar group in the Museum of Fine Arts, Boston.

The sarcophagus was relocated in the middle of the church in 1411. Between 1469 and 1473 a crowning was added on the flat top of the sarcophagus by Niccolò dell'Arca and several other masters in their art. Among them was the young Michelangelo, who added the statuettes of San Petronio (the patron saint of Bologna), a candlestick-holding angel and San Procolo (closely recalling the statue of David, made ten years later).

In 1532, a step was added between the sarcophagus and the altar slab by Alfonso Lombardi.

The present chapel of Saint Dominic was rebuilt starting in 1597 by the Bolognese architect Floriano Ambrosini, replacing the small gothic chapel that had been constructed in 1413. The Dominicans wanted a chapel for their founder to match the splendor of the other existing chapels. The fresco on the cupola of the apse Glory of St Dominic (1613–1615), depicting the ascent of the saint into heaven, is a baroque masterpiece by Guido Reni, the artistic value of this fresco matches that of the underlying Ark of St Dominic.

Finally the whole tomb was put on a marble altar in the 18th century. In a little chapel, on the back of the tomb, is the golden reliquary with the Head of St. Dominic, a masterpiece by Jacopo Roseto da Bologna (1383).

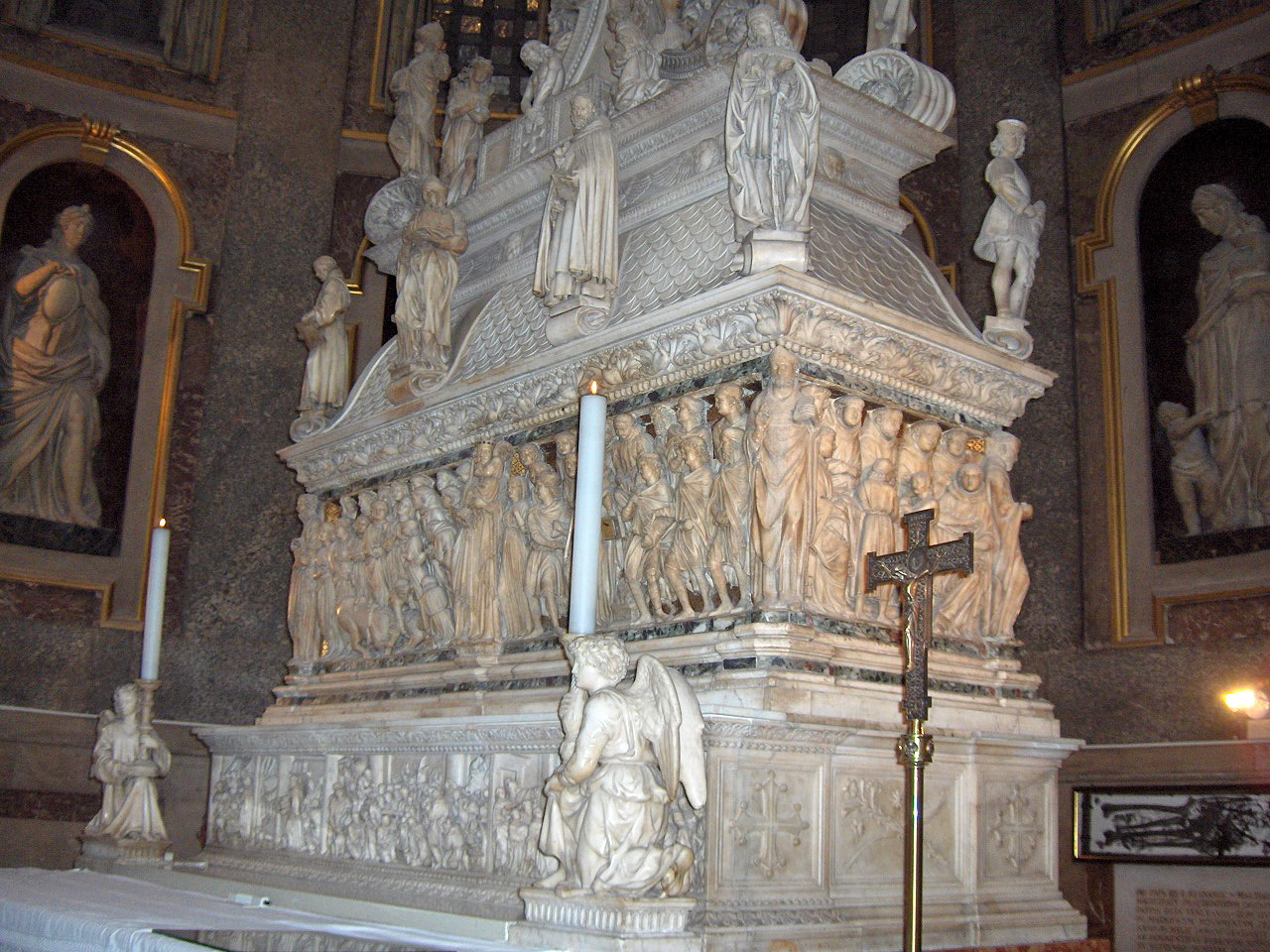
Front side of the sarcophagus.

== The sarcophagus ==
The sarcophagus is the middle part and also the oldest part of the shrine. It contains the remains of Saint Dominic in a cypress coffin, with the exception of his head (which is preserved in the reliquary at the back of the monument). Nicola Pisano, already famous for his pulpit in the Pisa Baptistery, was asked in 1264 to construct this sarcophagus. He was certainly responsible for the design, but left the brunt of the work to his workshop, since in 1265 he was already at work on a new commission (the pulpit for the Siena Cathedral).

The front side was done in his workshop, partially by Nicola Pisano himself but mostly by his assistant Lapo di Ricevuto. and another famous sculptor Arnolfo di Cambio. The Dominican brother fra Guglielmo da Pisa (who also designed in 1270 a pulpit in San Giovanni Fuorcivitas in Pistoia) made a small contribution. According to Gnudi (see ref.) an anonymous Fifth Master was also involved. A collaboration of several sculptors on such a large commission was normal practice in medieval sculpture.

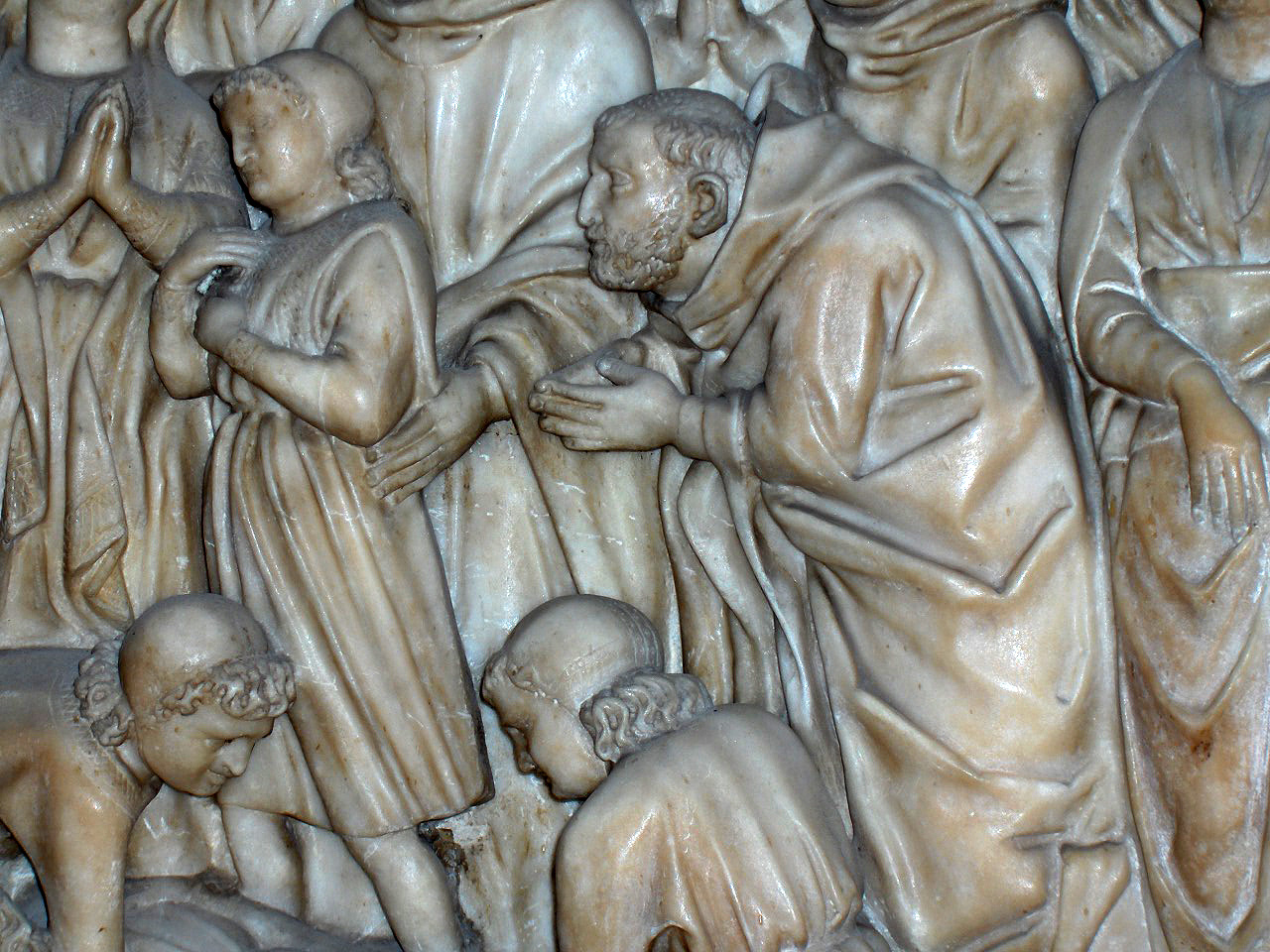
"St. Dominic resurrects the young Napoleone Orsini" (detail).

The sarcophagus recounts the life and miracles of Saint Dominic in a series of six carved panels. The compositions are neatly filled with figures in organized rows, giving a single approach to space. The sarcophagus is flanked on each corner by statues in high-relief of the Four Doctors of the Church.

The scenes are arranged in following sequence from left to right and counterclockwise:

- On the left corner stands Paul the Apostle.
- St. Dominic resurrects the young Napoleone Orsini, after a fatal fall from his horse. The expressive face of Saint Dominic, so different from the blander faces in this front panel, is attributed to Arnolfo di Cambio.
- In the middle: a high-relief of A Virgin and Child.
- The Miracle of the Book rejected by Fire, acting out a story of Dominic's preaching in Fanjeaux, southern France, against the Albigensian heresy.
- On the right corner St. Dominic with the Book and the Scourge.
- The Angels bring Bread to the Friars thanks to Dominic's Intercession, representing one of the first miracles of the saint.
- The back of the tomb gives two scenes (each with three episodes), divided by a statue of Christ the Redeemer.
  - On the left a scene of the life of Blessed Reginald of Orleans, founder of the monastery in Bologna; the Blessed promises St Dominic to enter the Order; the Blessed falls ill; the Virgin heals him and gives him the habit of the Preaching Friars
  - On the right: St. Dominic asks pope Innocent III to approve the Order; the pope dreams of the Saint supporting the basilica of the Lateran; the pope approves the foundation of the Order.
- In the corner on the right: a high-relief of St. Augustine, author of the Dominican Rule.
- The last relief gives two more episodes: The Apostles Peter and Paul appear to Saint Dominic, while he was praying in the basilica of St. Peter, and give him the staff and the Book (symbols of the Apostolic mission); the Saint sends his followers out on their mission to preach in the world.

Work on the sarcophagus was finished in 1267. This sarcophagus, originally with its caryatid supports, was taken as model for other tombs: the shrine of St Peter Martyr in the basilica of San Eustorgio in Milan, the shrine of St Luke (1316) in the basilica of San Giustina in Padua and the tomb of Beato Bertrando (c. 1334–1350) in Udine.

== The crowning ==
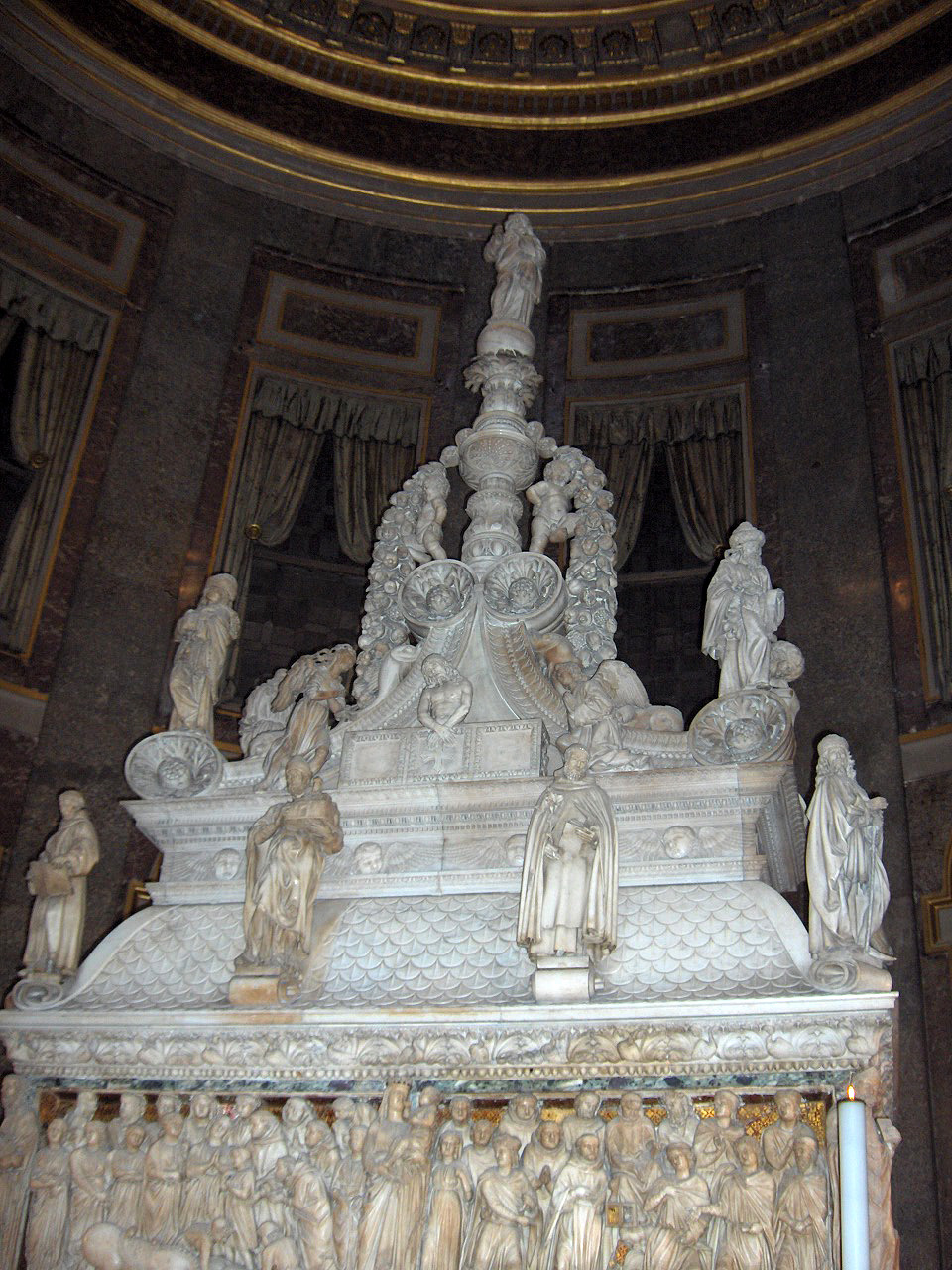
The elaborate spire.

The ambitious addition of a crowning to the sarcophagus was commissioned in 1469 to Niccolò da Bari to complete this funeral monument. Work at this elaborate spire continued till 1473. But it is not clear why Niccolò did not complete his contract, even if he did continue intermittently at it until his death in 1494.

On top of a candelabrum, rising from the cyma, stands the impressive statue of the Eternal Father. The candelabrum is held by two putti, symbols of the sky, and four dolphins, symbols of the sea, all covered with festoons with fruit, symbols of the earth.

On the cornice at its base is in the middle a small Pietà, flanked by two winged angels (the Angel of the Annunciation and the Angel of the Passion), while on the four corners stand the four Evangelists in oriental robes. The lower part of the cyma is surrounded by several free-standing figures, the Patron Saints of Bologna: Saint Francis of Assisi, St. Petronius (began by Niccolò but finished by young Michelangelo in 1494), Saint Dominic and Saint Florian. On the back stand the statues St Anne, St John the Baptist (sculpted by Girolamo Cortellini in 1539), San Vitale and St. Proclus (Michelangelo, 1494 – the resemblance and the posture of this statue shows that he likely had his David already in mind at that time).

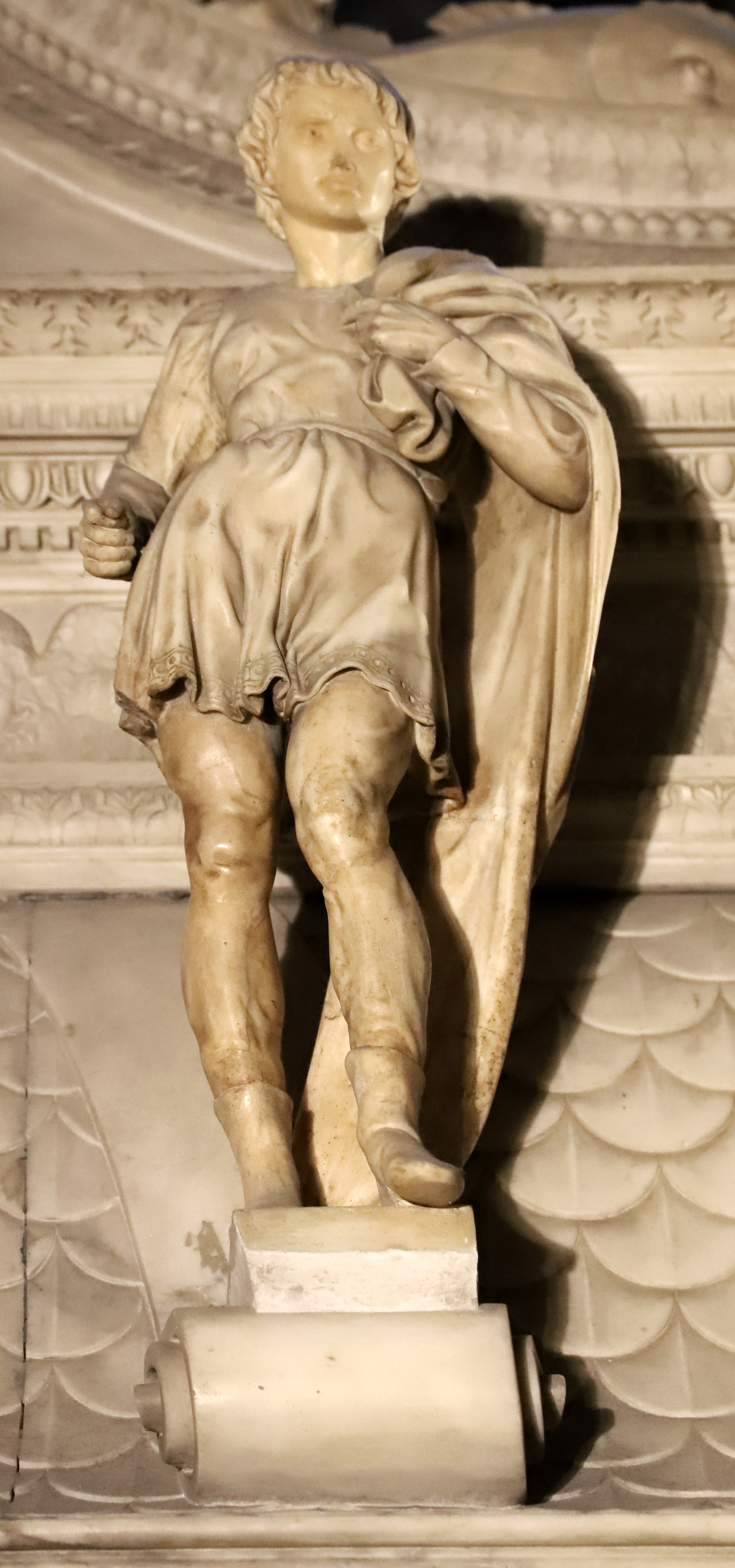
San Proculo (by Michelangelo).

Niccolò also added the delicate Candlestick-holding Angel on the left side of the altar slab, below the sarcophagus, while the Angel on the right side with its youthful strength is by Michelangelo. Michelangelo was paid thirty ducats by his patron Francesco Aldovrandi.

Because of the admiration he received for this splendid masterpiece, he was renamed Niccolò dell'Arca. Art critics perceive in this masterpiece a blend of influences: Burgundian, Florentine and non-Tuscan (such as details in clothing). The way these statuettes express their emotions and the patterns in their dresses and hair evoke the style of Jacopo della Quercia

== The step ==
The step, between the sarcophagus and the altar slab, was the third addition to the monument. It was sculpted in 1532 by Alfonso Lombardi (1497–1547). Again it depicts a number of episodes form the life of Saint Dominic.

- front: (left) St Dominic's birth; the young Dominic sleeping on the floor as a penance; Saint Dominic shows his charity by selling his valuable hand-glossed parchments to help the poor (while he was studying in Palencia)
- front (middle part) The Adoration of the Magi (with the inscription: Alphonsus de Lombardis Ferraniensis F(ecit))
- front (right) The Saint is taken to Heaven on a ladder supported by Christ and the Virgin.

== The altar ==
The marble altar was the last addition to the Arca. It was designed by Mauro Tesi (1730–1766) and later built by Alessandro Salviolini in 1768. On the altar slab stand the two statuettes of the angels holding a candlestick; on the left by Niccolò dell'Arca, on the right by Michelangelo.

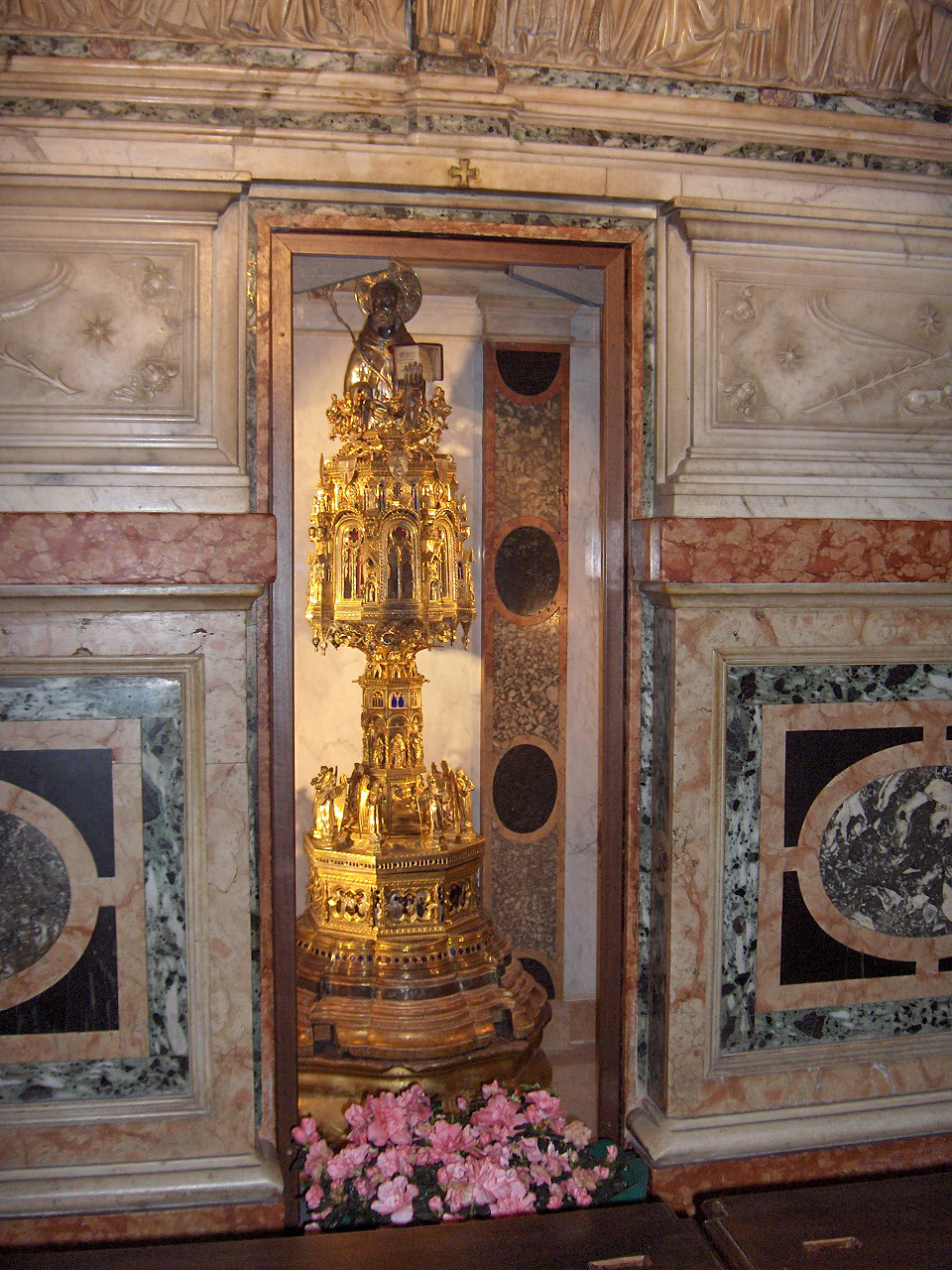
The reliquary.

The frontal was sculpted in G. Battista Boudard's workshop in Parma in 1768. It represents St. Dominic's Burial, as designed by Carlo Bianconi (1732–1802).

== The reliquary ==
Behind the altar, under the sarcophagus is a small chapel, protected by a bronze grill, containing the precious reliquary with the head of Saint Dominic. This masterpiece of gold and silver is the work of the goldsmith Jacopo Roseto da Bologna (1383). Its octagonal base is adorned with elaborate enamelled panels, related to events in the life of the saint. The shaft consists of three levels. It stands in the middle of a circle with winged angels. The shaft supports an octagonal temple, containing the head. It is adorned with Gothic windows and small statuettes in niches. The silver bust of the Saint crowns the whole, but it was added in a later stage.

== See also ==
- List of works by Michelangelo
