= Angel (Michelangelo) =

Marble statue by Michelangelo

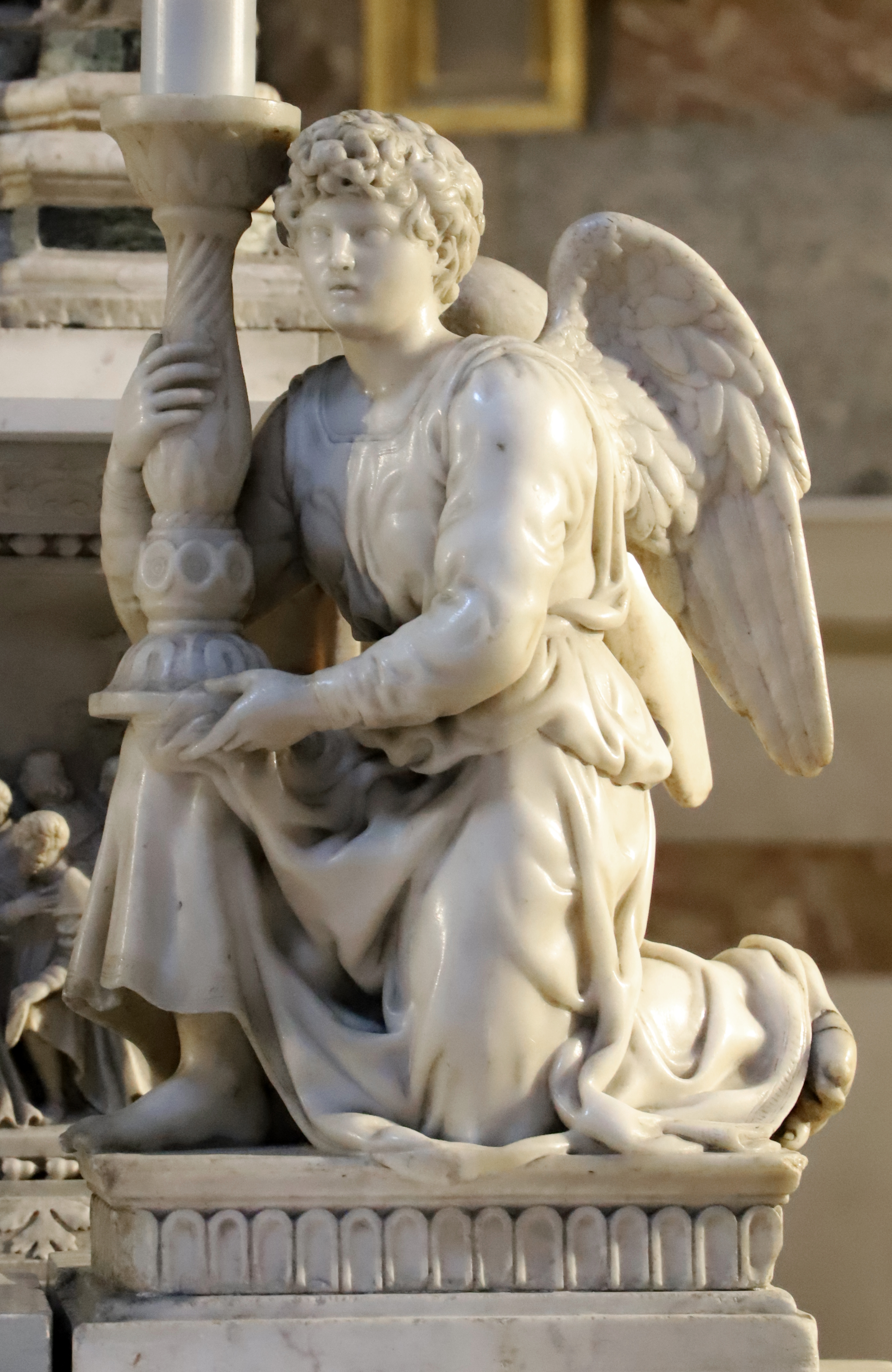
- Angel of Arca di San Domenico
- Artist: Michelangelo
- Year: 1494-1495
- Medium: Marble
- Location: Basilica of San Domenico; Bologna
- Preceded by: St. Proclus (Michelangelo)
- Followed by: Sleeping Cupid (Michelangelo)

The statue of an Angel (1494–1495) was created by Michelangelo out of marble. Its height is 51.5 cm. It is situated in the Basilica of San Domenico, Bologna, as a decorative object in arca San Domenico.

== See also ==
- St. Proclus (Michelangelo)
- St. Petronius (Michelangelo)
- List of works by Michelangelo
