= Niccolò dell'Arca =

Italian sculptor

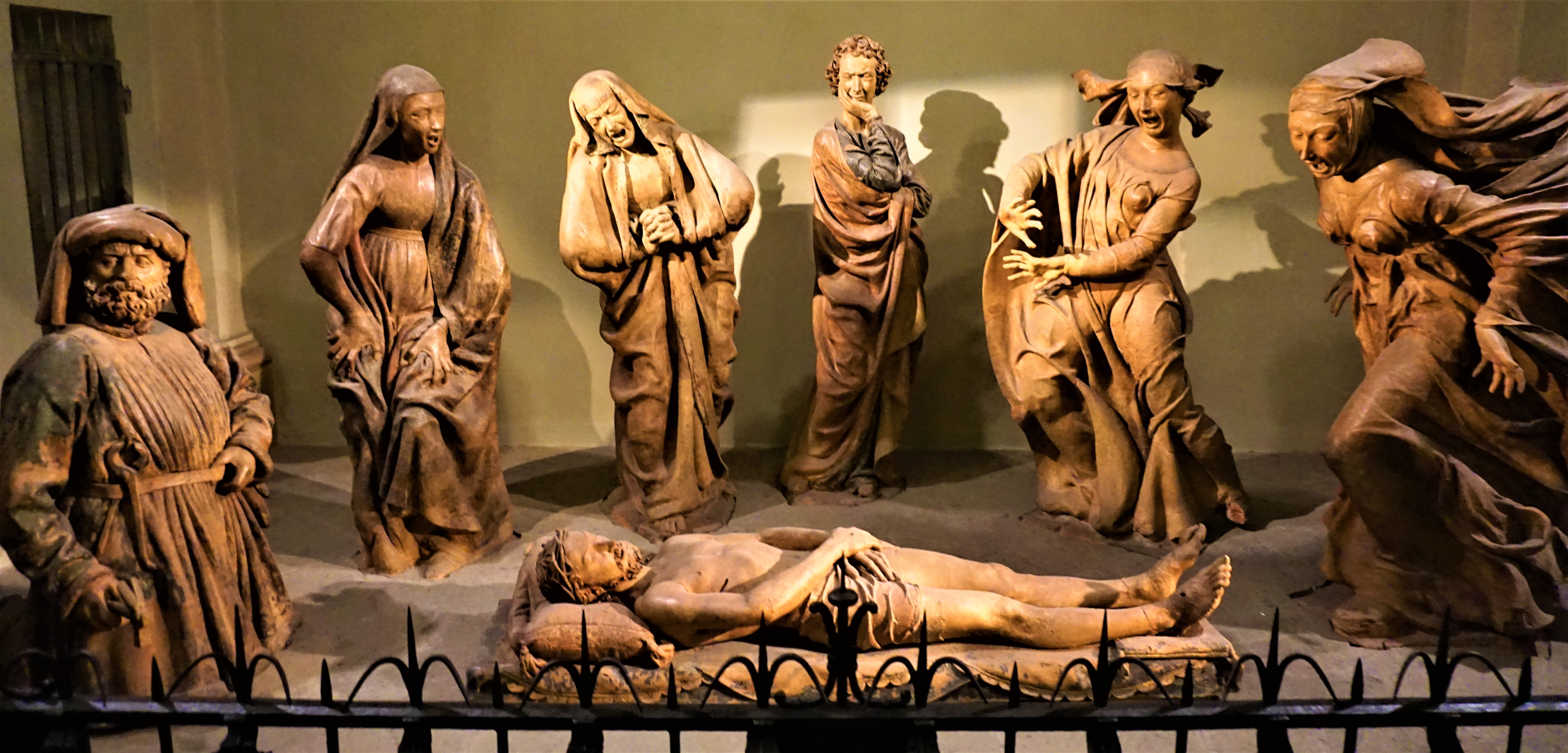
Compianto sul Cristo morto (Lamentation of Christ), Santa Maria della vita, Bologna

Lamentation of dead Christ

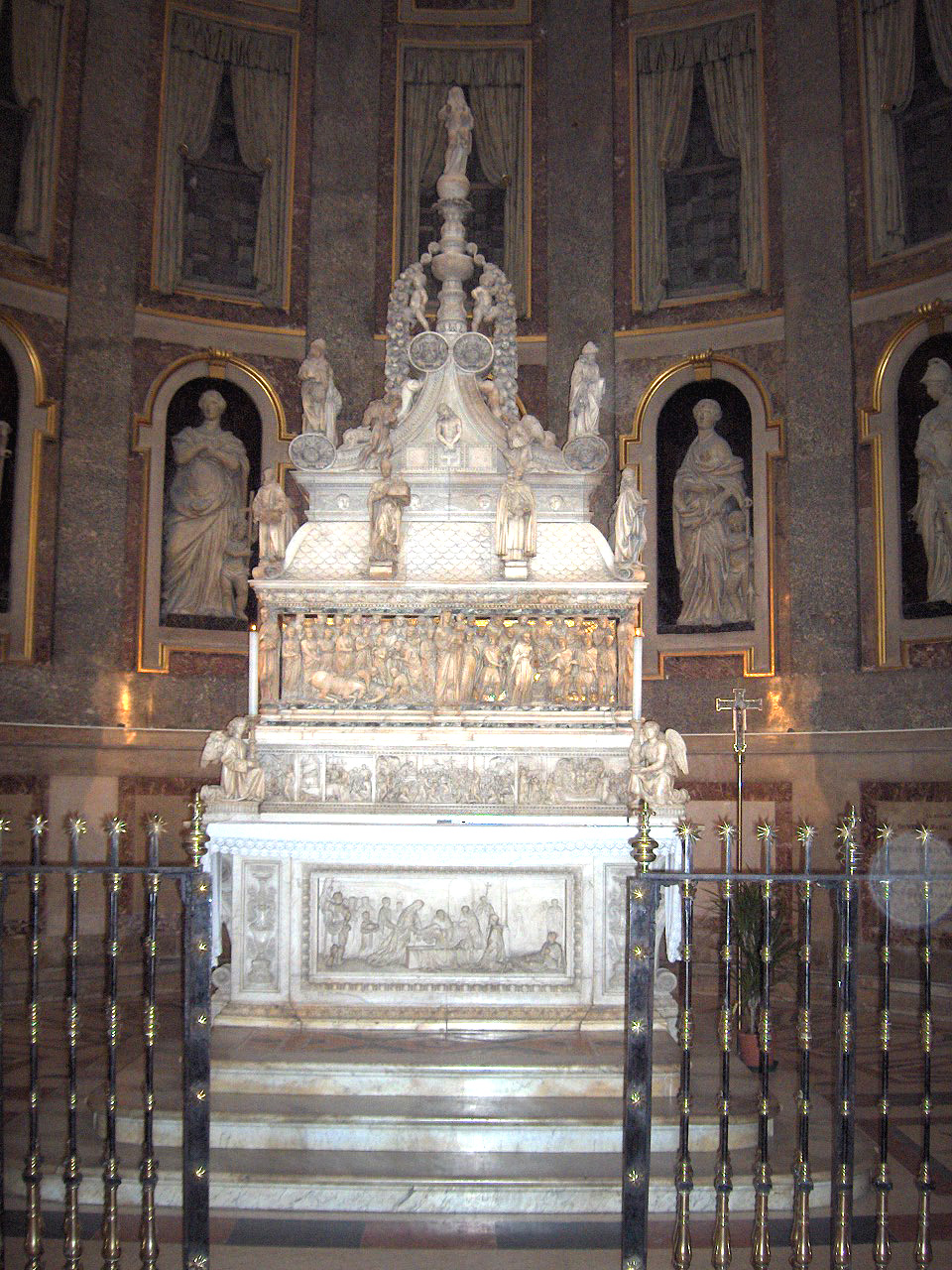
Arca di San Domenico

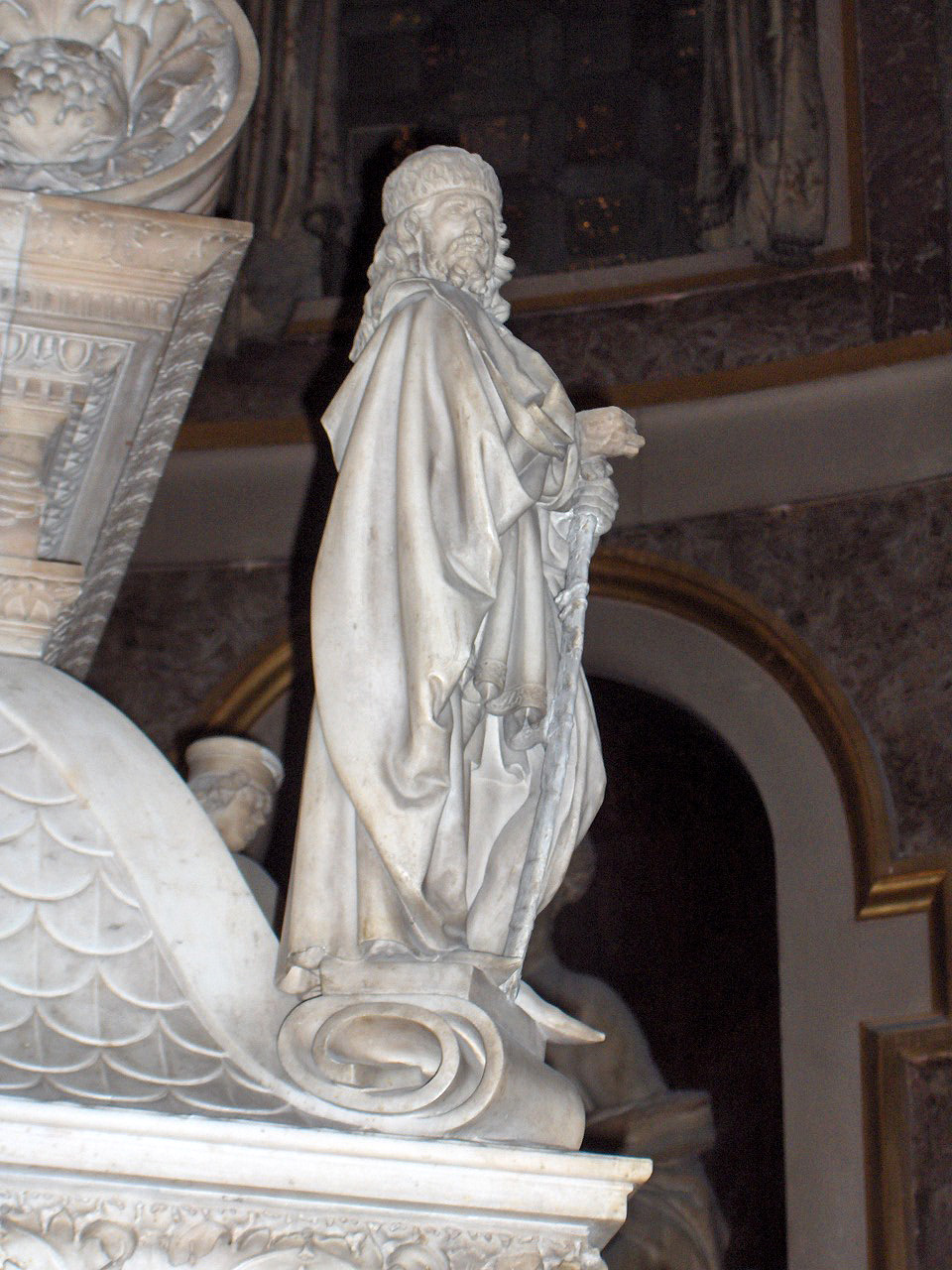
San Floriano (Arca di San Domenico)

Niccolò dell'Arca (c. 1435-1440 – 2 March 1494) was an Italian Early Renaissance sculptor, who worked mostly in terracotta. He is also known under the names Niccolò da Ragusa, Niccolò da Bari, Niccolò dall'Arca, and Niccolò d'Antonio d'Apulia. The surname "dell'Arca" refers to his contribution to the Arca di San Domenico.

The place and the year of his birth are not certain. He was probably born in Apulia, perhaps in Bari, and then most likely lived for some time in Dalmatia. According to C. Gnudi (see ref.) he received training there by the Dalmatian sculptor Giorgio da Sebenico.

The Burgundian elements in his sculpture are attributed by some art historians to his presumed participation in the triumphal arch of the Castel Nuovo in Naples during the 1450s (where he would have known the Catalan sculptor Guillem Sagrera and would be influenced by his style).

Others, rejecting his training in Naples, contend instead that he travelled to France in the late 1460s. According to them, his further training then allegedly took place in Siena, influenced by the works of Jacopo della Quercia and Donatello.

Compianto sul Cristo morto, Church of Santa Maria della vita, Bologna

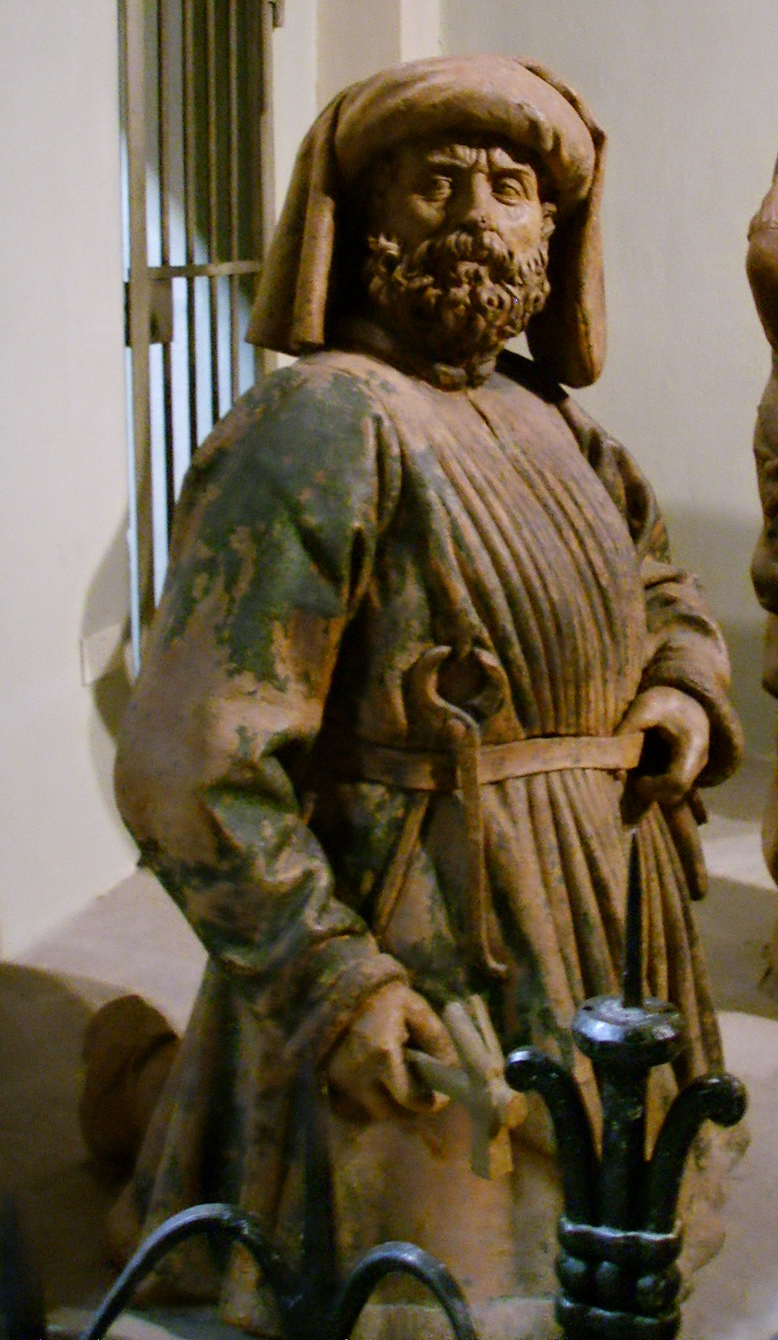
Left

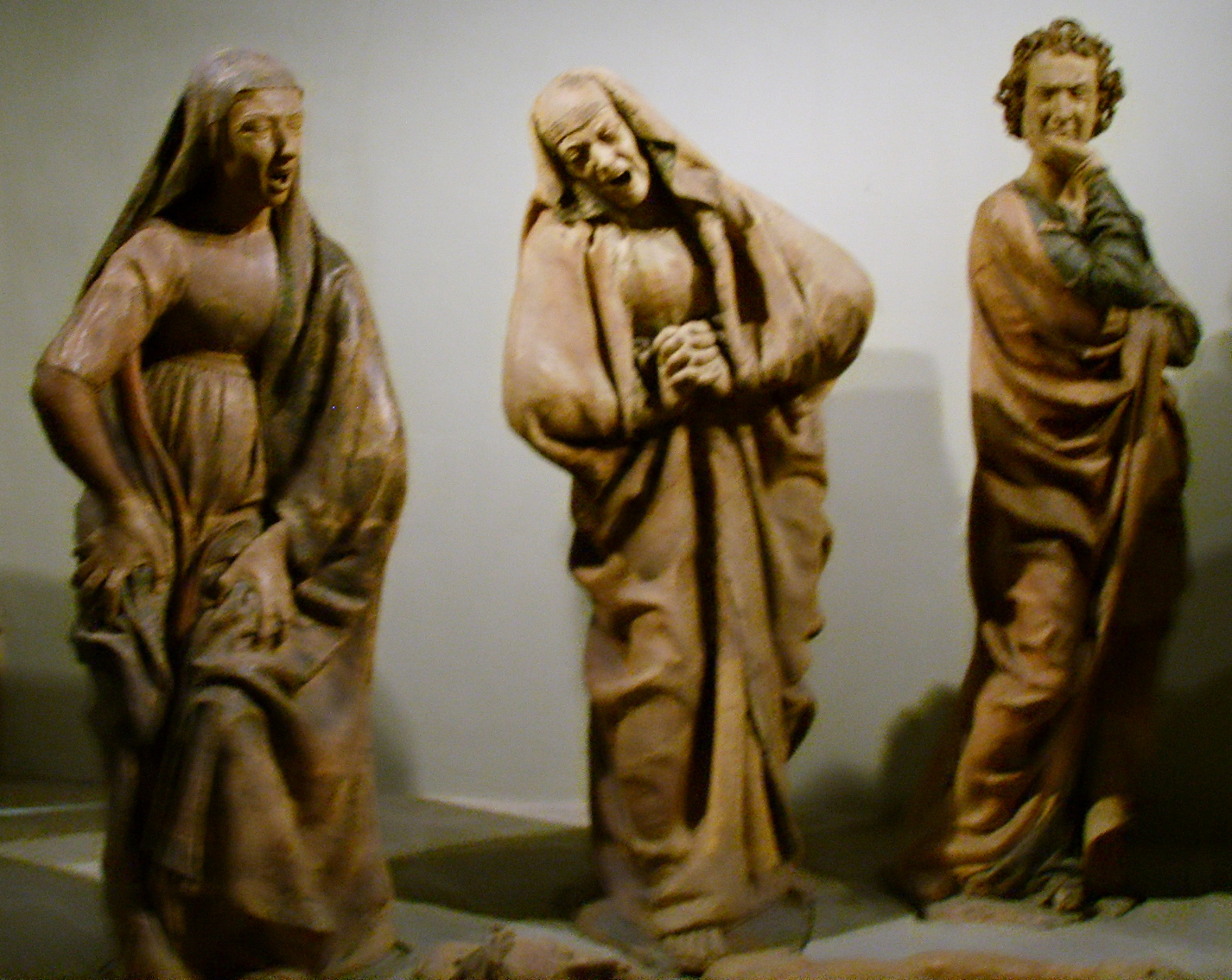
Center

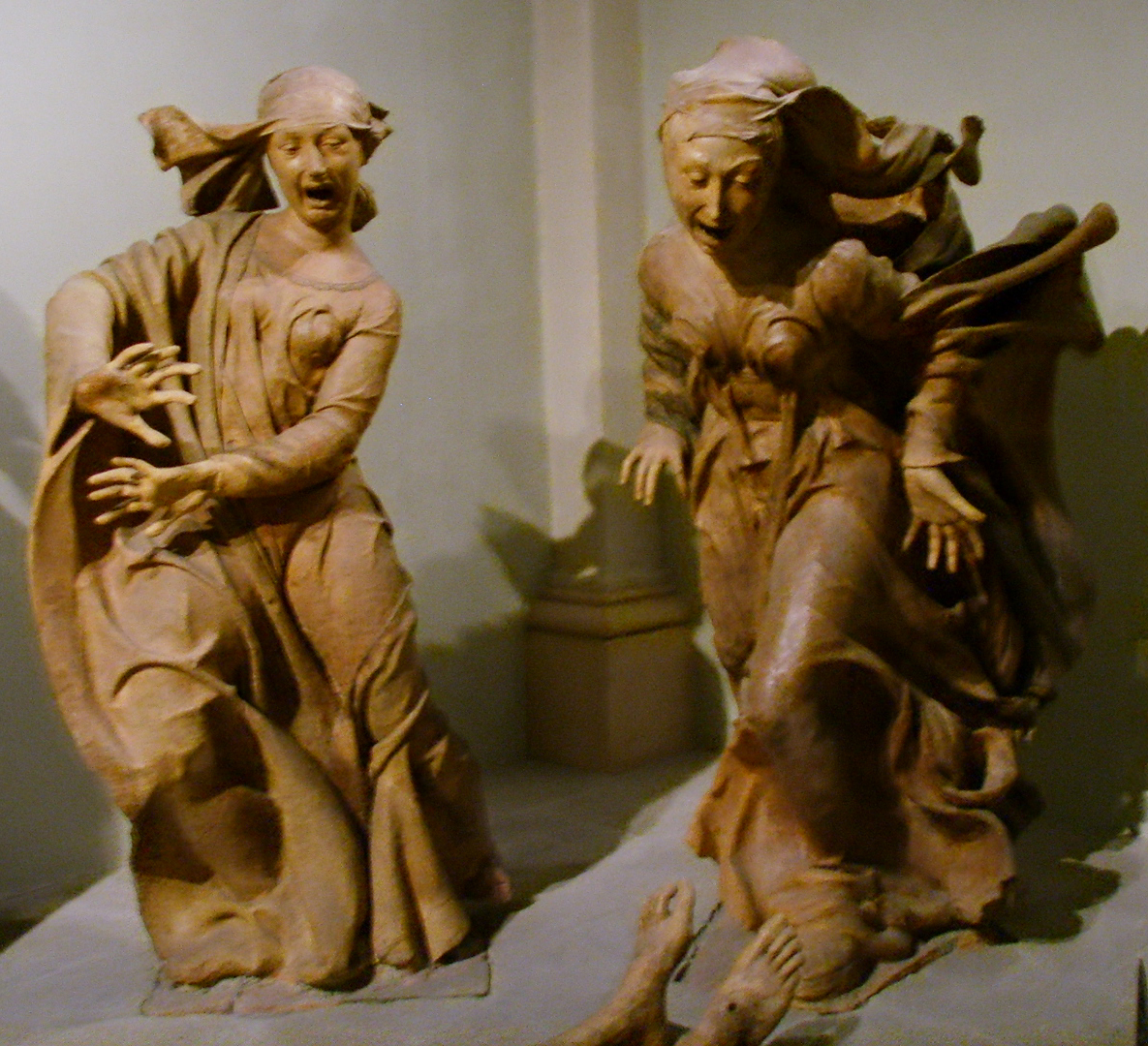
Right

== Career and works ==
He was mentioned for the first time in September 1462 in Bologna as Maestro Nicolò da Puglia, a “master of terracotta figures”. This probably refers to the “Compianto sul Cristo morto”, terracotta group in the sanctuary of Santa Maria della Vita in Bologna (also mentioned in a Bull of 1464 by Pope Paul II). A life-size group of six separate figures stand lamenting in a semicircle around the dead Christ in a lying posture. The dramatic pathos, the expressions of grief and torment of the figures is intensified by the realism of their dramatic facial details. However the date of this innovative contribution to Renaissance sculpture is uncertain. Instead of c. 1460, some date it between 1485 and 1490.

In 1469 he got the commission of an ambitious new addition on the Arca di San Domenico: a spiral superstructure and several free-standing figures on top of the sarcophagus. This sarcophagus with the remains of Saint Dominic had been sculpted two centuries before by Nicola Pisano and his workshop (between 1265 and 1267). It had been completed by Arnolfo di Cambio and fra Guglielmo Agnelli. Niccolò dell’Arca added an elaborate spire with an impressive statue of “God the Father” on top of a candelabrum, held by two putti and four dolphins, all covered with festoons with fruit. On the cornice at its base is in the middle a small Pietà, flanked by two angels, while on the four corners stand the four Evangelists in oriental dress. The lower part of the superstructure is surrounded by free-standing figures: the Patron Saints of Bologna (Saint Francis of Assisi), San Petronio (began by Niccolò but finished by young Michelangelo in 1494), Saint Dominic and Saint Florian. On the back stand St Anne, St John the Baptist (sculpted by Girolamo Cortellini in 1539), San Procolo and San Vitale. Niccolò also added the Candlestick-holding Angel on the left side of the altar slab (the one on the right side is by Michelangelo).

Niccolò dell’Arca worked on this masterpiece between 1469 and 1473, leaving it unfinished. He probably continued intermittently at it until his death. Art critics see in this masterpiece a blend of influences: Burgundian, Florentine and non-Tuscan (such as details in clothing). The way these statuettes express their emotions and the patterns in their dresses and hair evoke the style of Jacopo della Quercia.

Some other important works include the terracotta bust of Saint Dominic (1474) (in the museum of the Basilica of San Domenico in Bologna), a marble statue of St. John the Baptist (in the Escorial in Madrid) and the terracotta figure of Saint Monica (c. 1478-1480) (Museum Palace in Modena).

Also notable is the terracotta high relief of Madonna di Piazza (1478) on the wall of the Palazzo Comunale in Bologna. In the marked drapery folds is seen the influence of Jacopo della Quercia and also traces of the dynamic naturalism of his contemporary Andrea del Verrocchio.

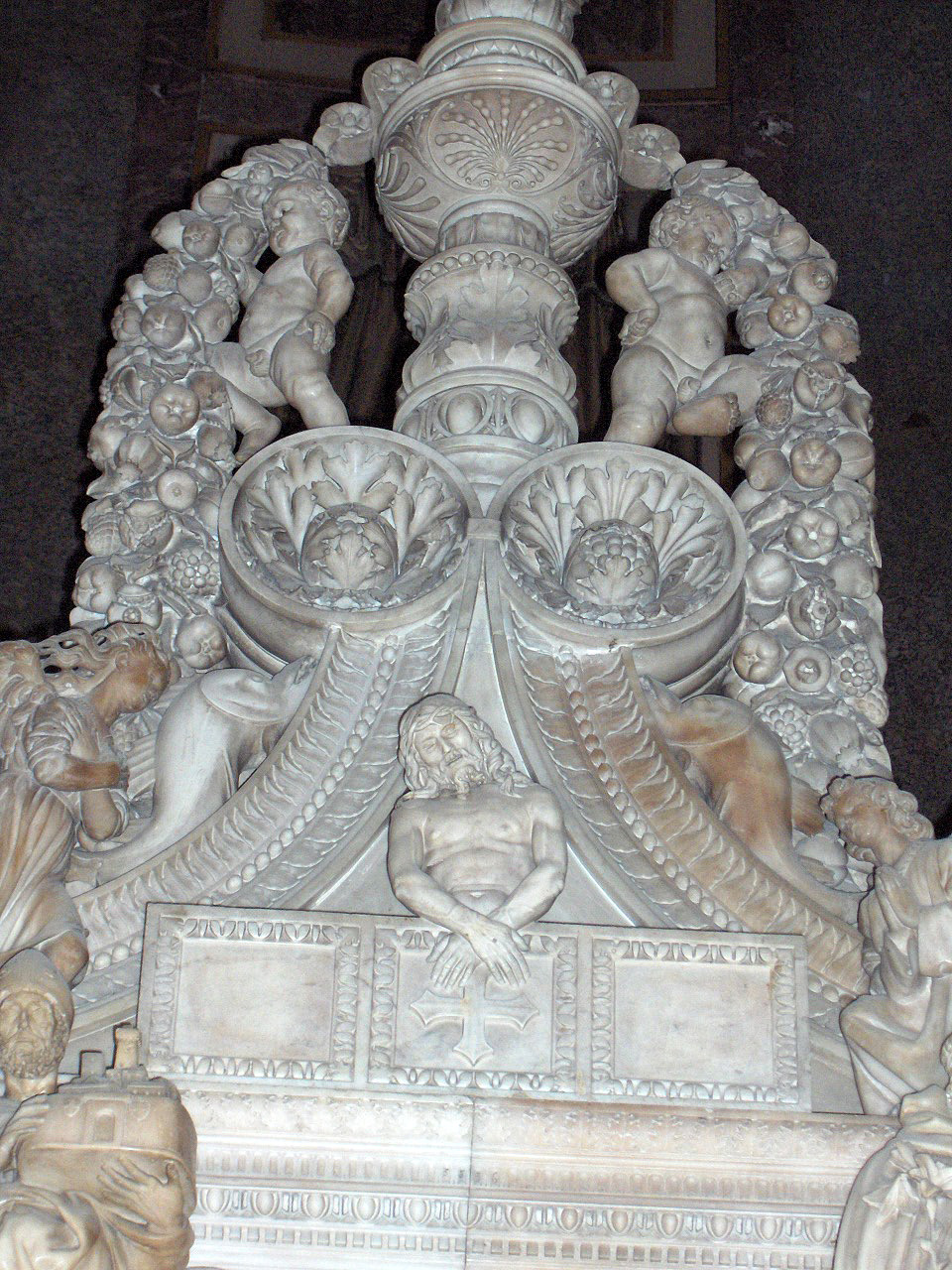
Pietà (Arca di San Domenico)

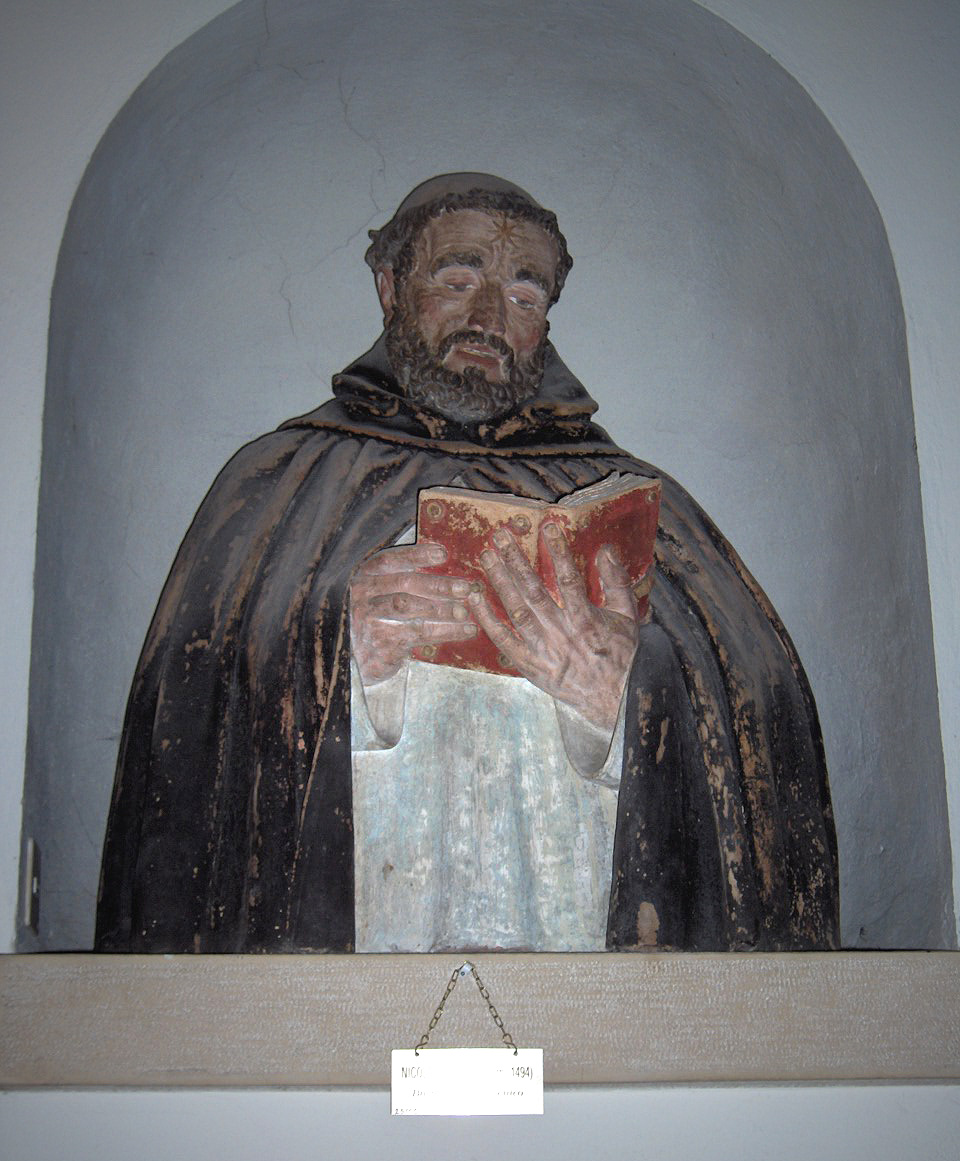
Polychromed terracotta of Saint Dominic

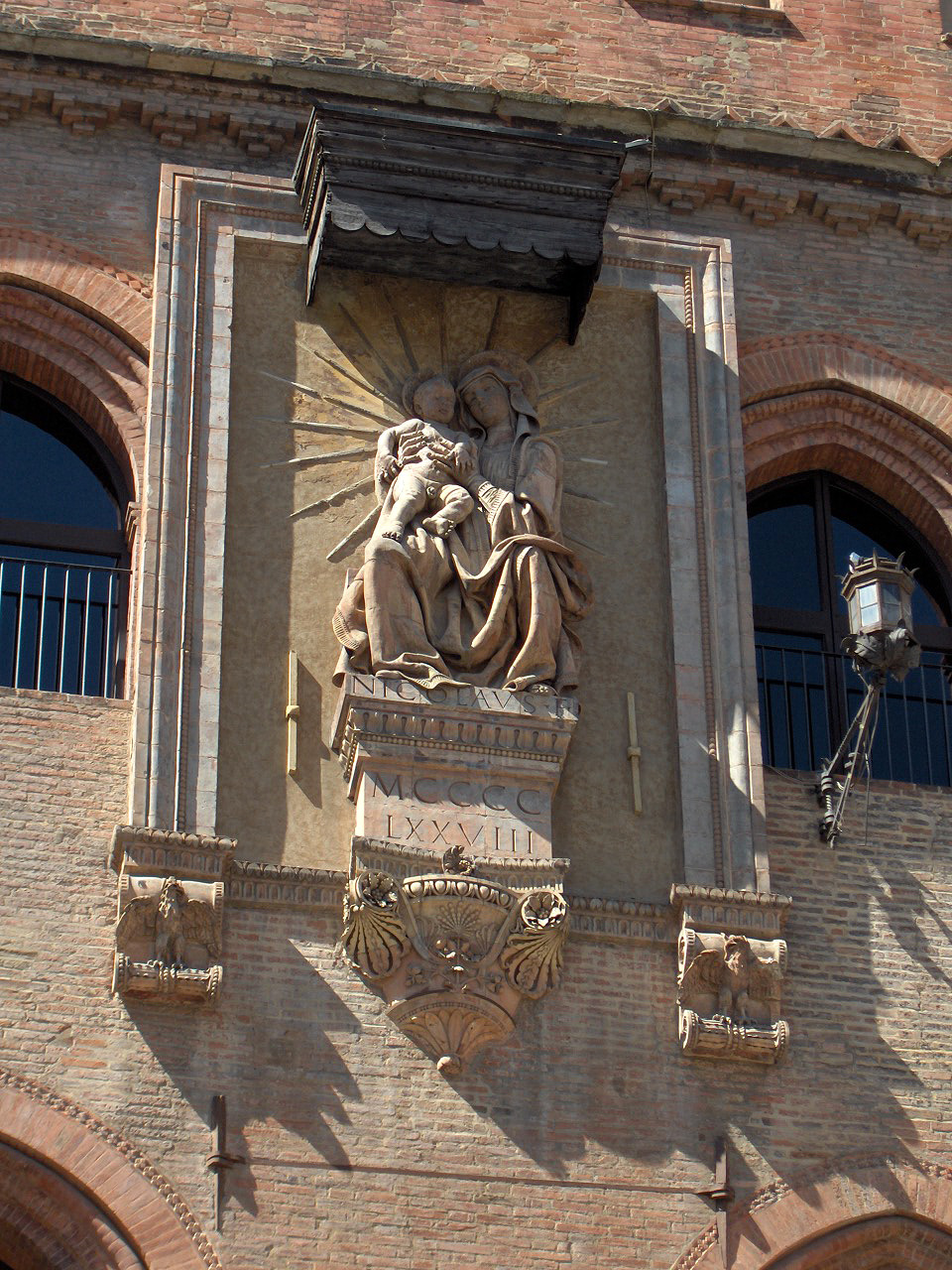
Madonna di Piazza, Bologna
