= Sleeping Cupid (Michelangelo) =

Sculpture by Michelangelo

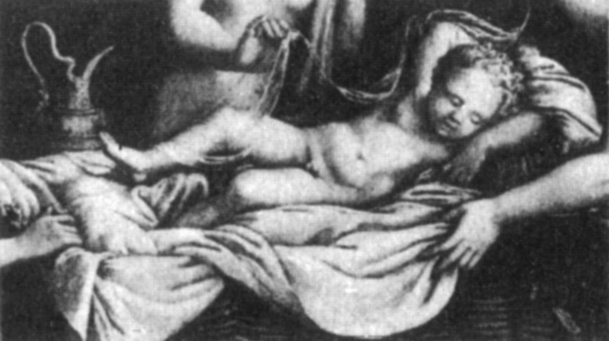
- Giulio Romano's Young Jupiter in National Gallery, London, possibly contains a citation of Michelangelo's Sleeping Cupid
- Artist: Michelangelo
- Year: 1496
- Preceded by: Angel (Michelangelo)
- Followed by: Bacchus (Michelangelo)

The Sleeping Cupid is a now-lost sculpture created by Renaissance artist Michelangelo, which he artificially aged to make it look like an antique on the advice of Lorenzo di Pierfrancesco in order to sell for a higher price. It was this sculpture which first brought him to the attention of patrons in Rome.

== Creation ==
Michelangelo, about 20 years old, began working on his sleeping cupid in 1495, in Florence, Italy. Michelangelo never said why he carved a sculpture of a cupid, but it is known that he studied a sculpture in the Medici Gardens that contained a sleeping cupid. Ascanio Condivi, the Italian Painter, described Michelangelo's work as "a god of love, aged six or seven years old and asleep".

== Description ==
Michelangelo created the sculpture and then passed it onto a dealer, Baldassare del Milanese. Eventually the sleeping cupid was bought by Cardinal Riario of San Giorgio; controversy arose when he discovered the statue was falsely aged and demanded his money back. However, Michelangelo was permitted to keep his share of the money. When Michelangelo offered to take the sculpture back from Baldassare when he learned how much money he made off of selling it, Baldassare refused, saying, "he would rather break it into a hundred pieces; he had bought the child, and it was his property".

The Sleeping Cupid was a significant work in establishing the reputation of the young Michelangelo, who was 21 at the time. The sculpture was later donated by Cesare Borgia to Isabella d'Este, and was probably collected by Charles I of England when all the Gonzaga collections were bought and taken to London in the seventeenth century.

It was previously impossible to attempt to identify Michelangelo's cupid, until Paul Norton's proposal that Michelangelo's work may be in the Album of Busts and Statues in Whitehall. This led to one of the cupids on the album to be thought to be Michelangelo's lost cupid, as the description matches quite well. But it is still unknown if this is the exact one Michelangelo created, as there is no record of the statue after the original sale.

== Destruction ==
In 1698, the Sleeping Cupid was most likely destroyed in the great fire in the Palace of Whitehall, London along with many other fine works of art. It is unknown what happened to the sculpture.

== See also ==
- List of works by Michelangelo
