= Nicola Pisano =

Italian sculptor (died 1284)

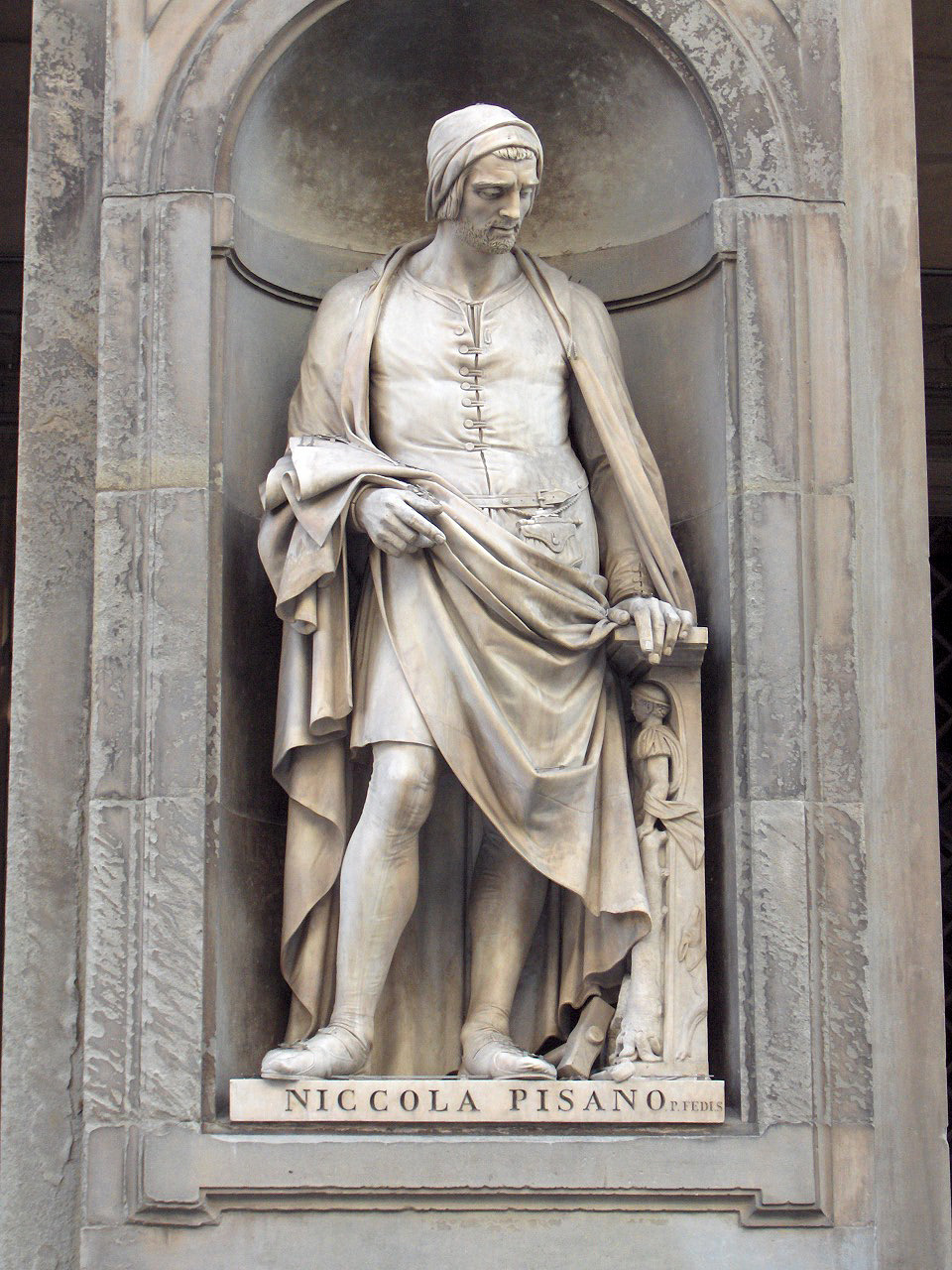
Posthumous 19th century portrait statue of Nicola Pisano at the Uffizi in Florence, Italy

Nicola Pisano (also called Niccolò Pisano, Nicola de Apulia or Nicola Pisanus; c. 1220/1225 – c. 1284) was an Italian sculptor whose work is noted for its classical Roman sculptural style. Pisano is sometimes considered to be the founder of modern sculpture.

== Early life ==
His birth date or origins are uncertain. He was born in Apulia, as the son of "Petrus de Apulia", as stated in the archives of the Cathedral of Siena. Nicola Pisano was probably trained in the local workshops of the emperor Frederick II, and he attended his coronation. Here he was trained to give to the traditional representations more movement and emotions, intertwining Classical and Christian traditions. His only remaining works from this period are two griffon heads with a soft chiaroscuro effect.

Around 1245 he moved to Tuscany to work at the Prato Castle. The lions on the portal of this castle are probably by his hand. "The head of a young girl" (now displayed in the Museo del Palazzo Venezia in Rome), cut in the hardstone of Elba, is also ascribed to Nicola Pisano in the same period.

He moved to Lucca, working at façade of the Cathedral of Saint Martin, resulting in the relief Deposition from the Cross (on the north tympanum) and the lintel reliefs Nativity and Adoration of the Magi.

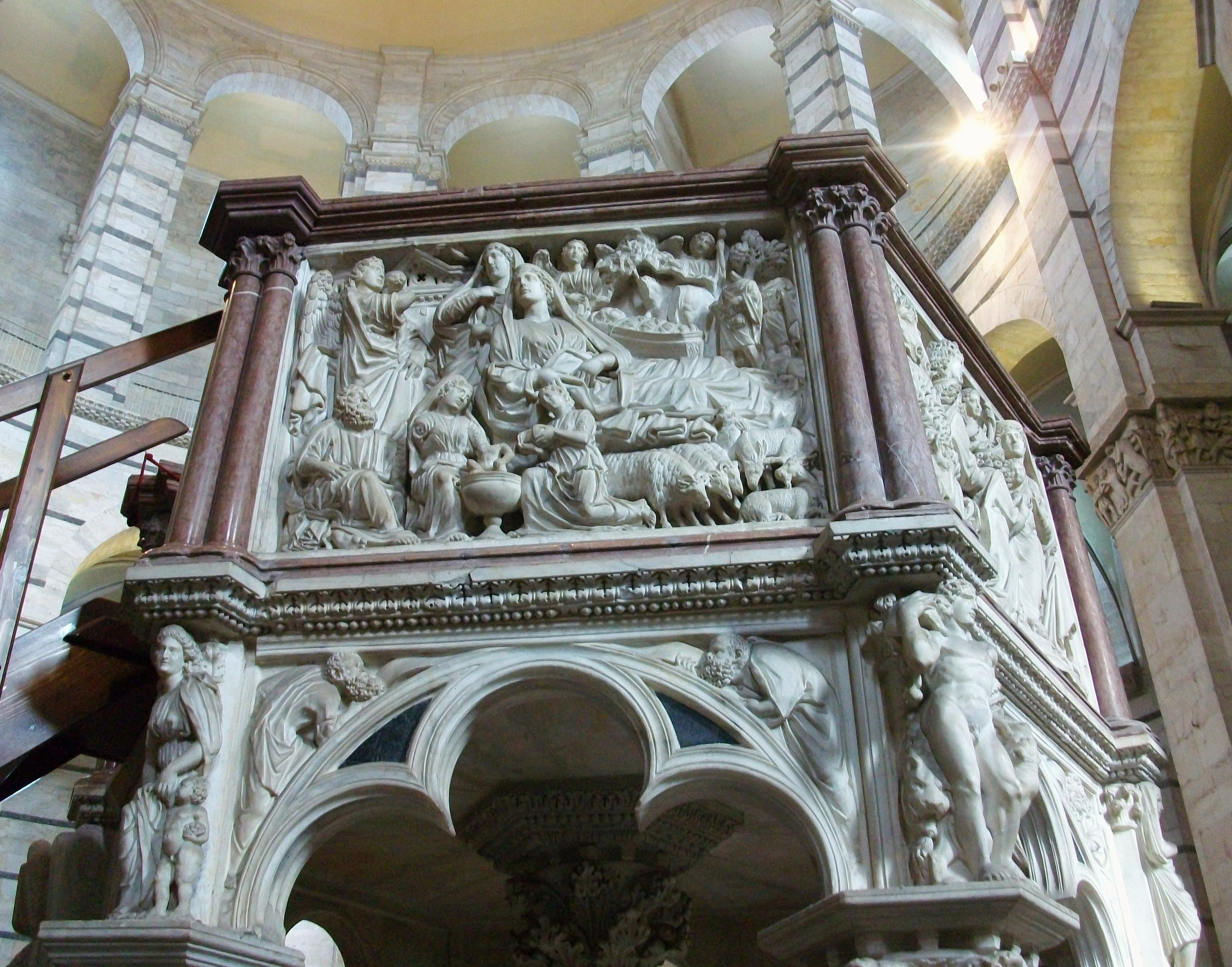
Pulpit (detail): the "Nativity" and Annunciation to the Shepherds

== Pulpit of the Pisa baptistery ==
He moved to Pisa between 1245 and 1250, where his son Giovanni Pisano was born. Around 1255 he received a commission for the pulpit in the Pisa Baptistry. He finished this work in 1260 and signed it with "Nicola Pisanus". He was aided by several assistants, among which were Arnolfo di Cambio and Lapo di Ricevuto.

In this pulpit, considered one of his masterworks, he succeeded in making a synthesis of the French Gothic style with the Classical style of ancient Rome, as he had probably learned in South Italy and must have seen on the sarcophagi of the Camposanto in Pisa, such as the Phaedra sarcophagus or Meleager hunting the Calydonian Boar on a sarcophagus brought as booty to Pisa by its navy. Vasari relates that Nicola Pisano constantly studied these Roman remains and the Roman sculptures from Augustan times seem to have marked a deep impression on him.

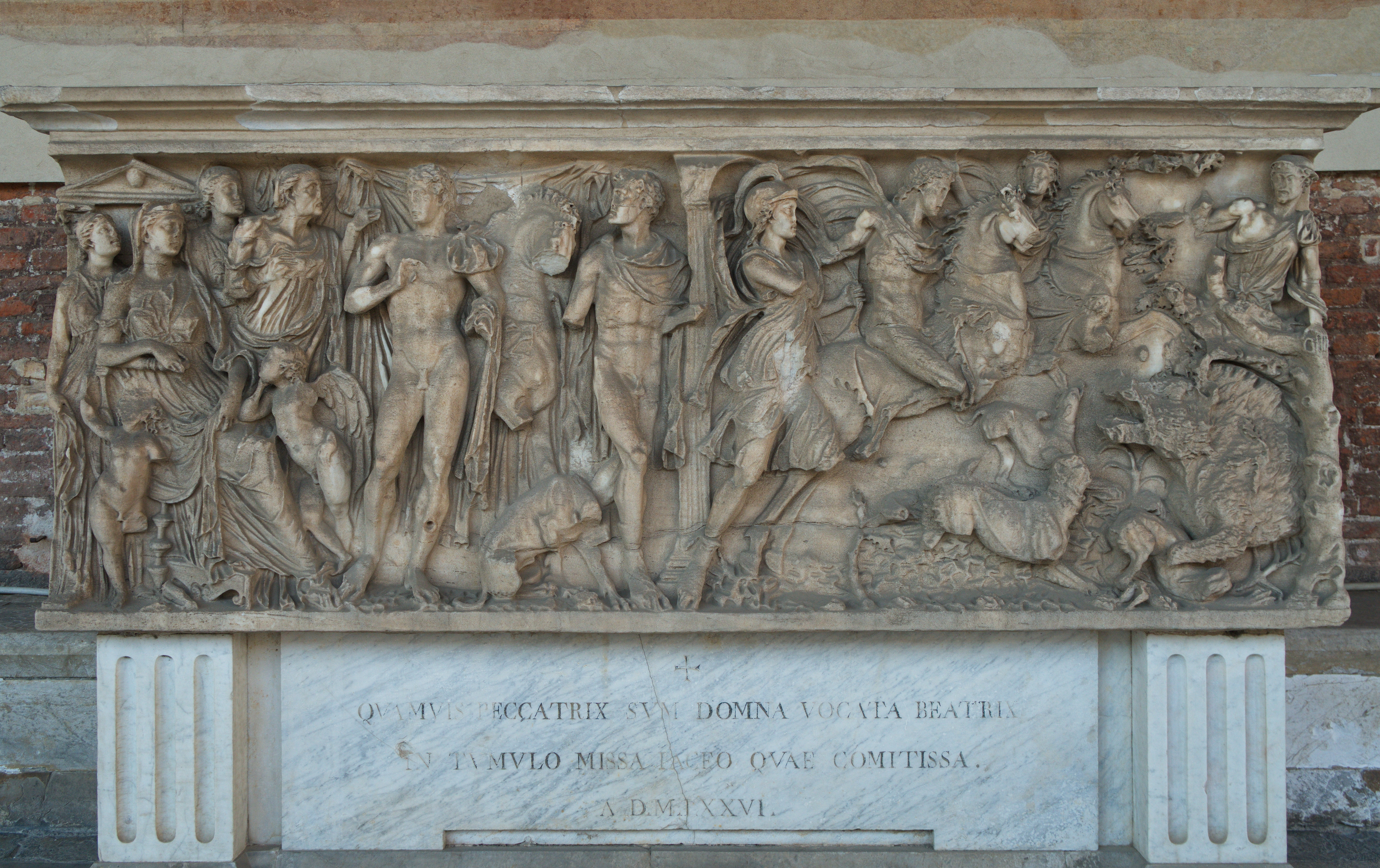
Phaedra and Hippolytus Sarcophagus, 1-2 ct. C.E., Camposanto, Pisa

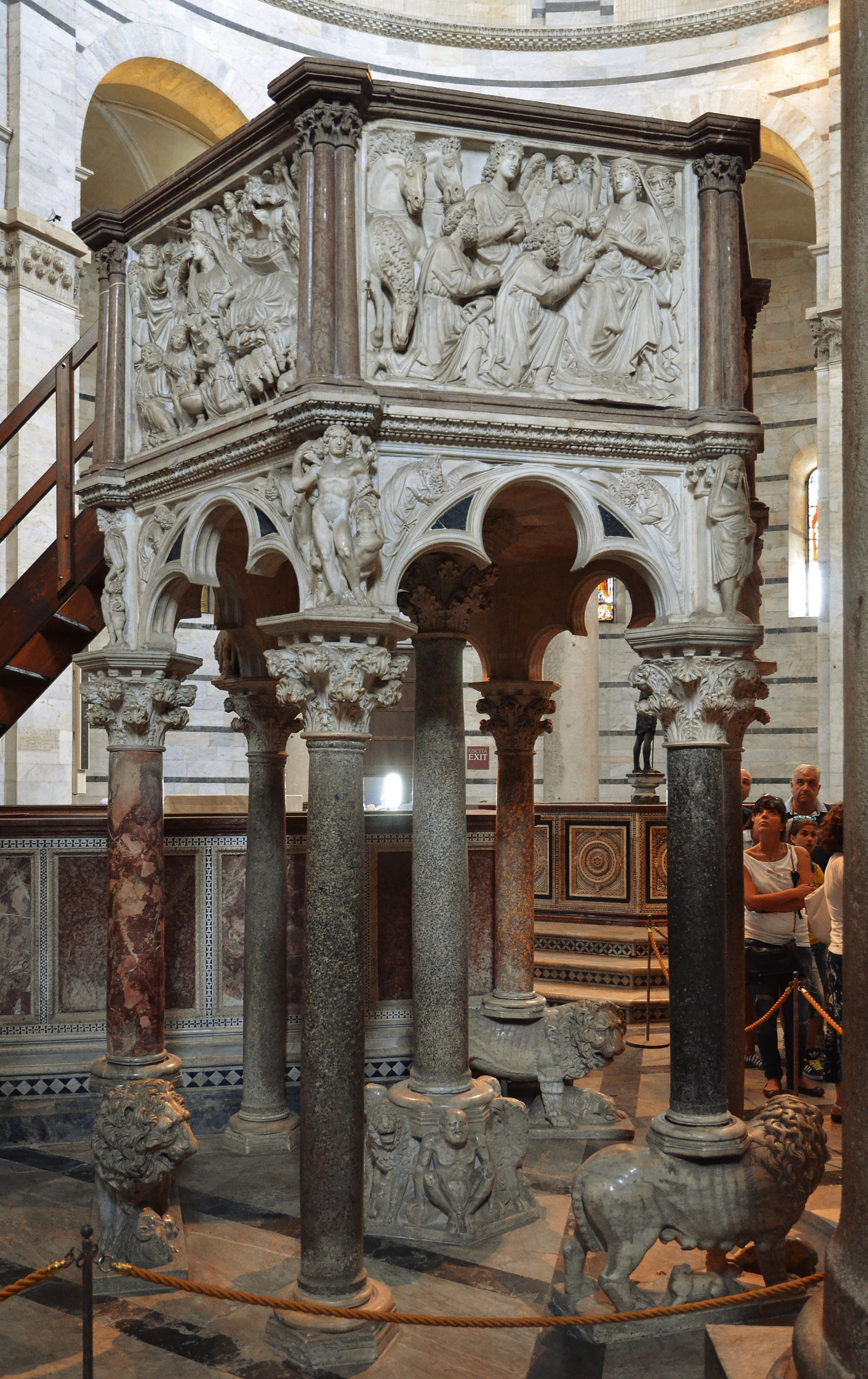
Nicola Pisano's Pisa pulpit with the first two reliefs and the Hercules beneath

The pulpit rests on seven columns. A raised central column is supported by sculptures of animals and telamons. It is surrounded by six external columns of different heights, three of which rest on realistically carved lions, while the other three rest on octagonal bases. The columns came from remains at Ostia. The Corinthian capitals support trefoil Gothic arches, decorated in the spandrels with paired Prophets and, under the reliefs of the Crucifixion and the Last Judgement, with Evangelists. The arches are separated by sculptures of St. John the Baptist, St. Michael and four Virtues, Charity, Fortitude, Temperance and Prudence. The nude sculpture of Fortitude obviously derives from a Roman Hercules.

The hexagonal pulpit itself consists of five reliefs in white Carrara marble from the Life of Christ: the first relief combines three scenes, the Annunciation, the Nativity and the Annunciation to the Shepherds, while the following show single scenes: the Adoration of the Magi, the Presentation in the Temple, the Crucifixion and the Last Judgment. The backgrounds of these scenes were originally painted and enamelled, while the eyes of the figures were coloured. This contributed further to a realistic impression of these religious topics. All these reliefs, except the last two, reflect Pisano's knowledge of the style on Roman sarcophagi. The figures wear tunics in a Roman fashion. The reclining Virgin of the Nativity derives from Etruscan tomb sculpture. She also wears a pallium over her head in the same manner as a Roman matron. In the Presentation panel the Madonna reminds us of the regal bearing of goddesses in late Roman sculpture, while the expressive face of St. Anne shows the ravages of age.

The scene The Last Judgement was probably based on a Byzantine ivory and The Crucifixion was sculpted with the same elegance as contemporary French Gothic art.

Another inspiration for this pulpit he may have found also in the triumphal arches he could have seen in Rome when travelling to Ostia. The form of this pulpit diverges completely from contemporary art. The sculptures are represented in the same manner as those of the Arch of Constantine in Rome, with the figures standing atop columns. Furthermore, the same arch has an attic storey with sculpted scenes, as does the pulpit.^{Ref?}

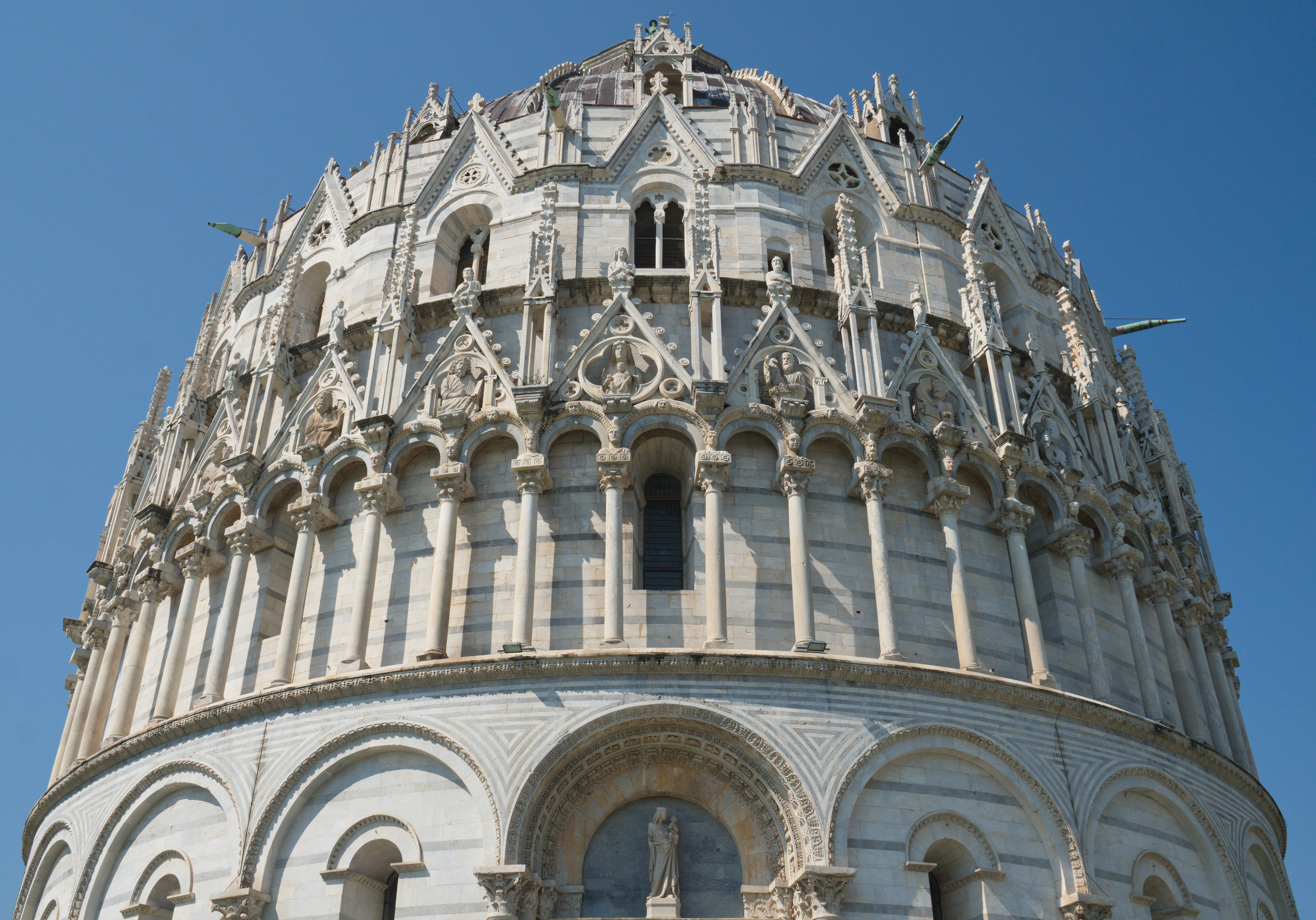
East side of the baptistery above main portal with the Gothic arcade by Nicola (and Giovanni) Pisano

Between 1260 and 1264 he finished the work of the architect Diotisalvi on the dome of the baptistery.^{Ref?} He increased its height with a system of two domes: a small truncated cone on top of the hemispherical dome. The two rows of traceried gables were later decorated by his son Giovanni Pisano between 1277 and 1284.

== Shrine of Saint Dominic (Bologna) ==
During 1264 he was asked to work on the Shrine of Saint Dominic in the Basilica of San Domenico in Bologna. He was certainly responsible for the design, but his input was probably minimal. In 1265 he was already at work on the pulpit for the Siena Cathedral. The front side was done in his workshop, partially by Nicola Pisano himself but mostly by his assistant Lapo di Ricevuto. It would almost take 500 years to finish this shrine through the work of famous sculptors: Arnolfo di Cambio, fra Guglielmo Agnelli, Niccolò dell'Arca, the young Michelangelo, Girolamo Coltellini and Giovanni Batista Boudard. The expressive face of saint Dominic, so different from the blander faces in the front panel "Saint Dominic resurrects Napoleone Orsini", is attributed to Arnolfo di Cambio.

== Siena Cathedral Pulpit ==
In September 1265 he was given his next major assignment: a marble pulpit for Siena Cathedral. This pulpit, made of Carrara marble, was sculpted between the end of 1265 and November 1268 with the extensive participation of his son Giovanni Pisano and his assistants Arnolfo di Cambio, Lapo di Ricevuto and several other artists.

This is the earliest remaining work in the cathedral. Nicola Pisano was given this commission due to his fame by the Pisa pulpit. This pulpit, resembling the Pisa pulpit but larger, is even more ambitious and is considered his masterpiece. The whole message of the pulpit is concerned with the doctrine of Salvation and the Last Judgment.

== Pistoia and Perugia ==
In July 1273 Nicola Pisano was commissioned by the Operai di San Jacopo of Pistoia to make the altar of San Jacopo in the Pistoia Cathedral. He worked on it together with his son Giovanni. The chapel of San Jacopo was demolished in 1786. The Holy Water stoup with its three female figures was probably sculpted at the same time. Giovanni Pisano would later make his first pulpit in the same cathedral.

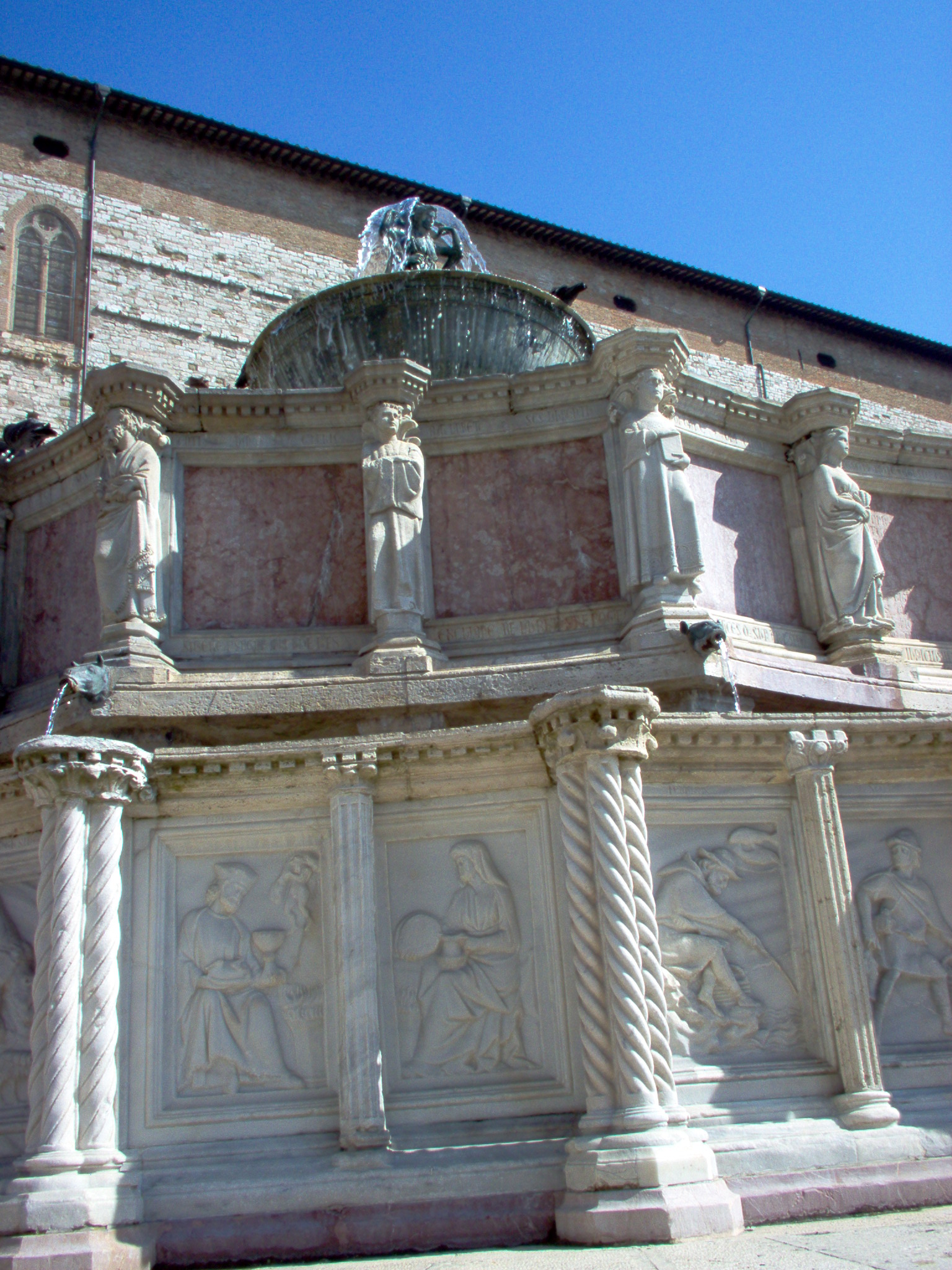
Fontana Maggiore, Perugia

His last major commission was the relief panels on the Fontana Maggiore ("Great Fountain") at Perugia (1277–1278). Fra Bevignate and Boninsegna designed the fountain with three superposed basins. The fountain certainly shows the delicate hand of Nicolò Pisano, but most sculpting was executed by his son Giovanni Pisano and his assistants. By its richness in details and by its iconography, this last work shows a rapprochement to French Gothic art.

== Conclusion ==
Although influenced by the works of Classical Antiquity, Nicola was not simply an imitator. His figures are original creations that came into being through a thorough study and understanding of the antique prototypes and the reinstating of antique representations. His works are the most important precursors of Italian Renaissance sculpture. Surveys of Italian Renaissance art often begin with the year 1260, the year that Nicola Pisano dated his pulpit in the Pisa baptistery.

On the other hand, as the pulpit of the Siena Cathedral shows, Nicola Pisano was still attached to contemporary Gothic art. This characteristic may arise because this pulpit was finished by his son Giovanni Pisano who did not appreciate Antiquity in the same manner. Both styles coexisted for several generations. International Gothic and its variations became briefly more popular in the Early 15th century than the Classicism of the High Renaissance.

Nicola Pisano has pushed 13th-century Tuscan sculpture in the direction of art that integrated the features of Roman art, while simultaneously staying attached to the Gothic art from Northern Europe. The true inheritor of Nicola's classical style was Arnolfo di Cambio (c. 1250–1302), whose early death left the field clear for Giovanni Pisano, who, by then, was already pursuing his own mixture of French Gothic and the classical style.

Giorgio Vasari included a biography of Nicola Pisano in his Lives.
