= Guglielmo Agnelli =

Italian sculptor and architect

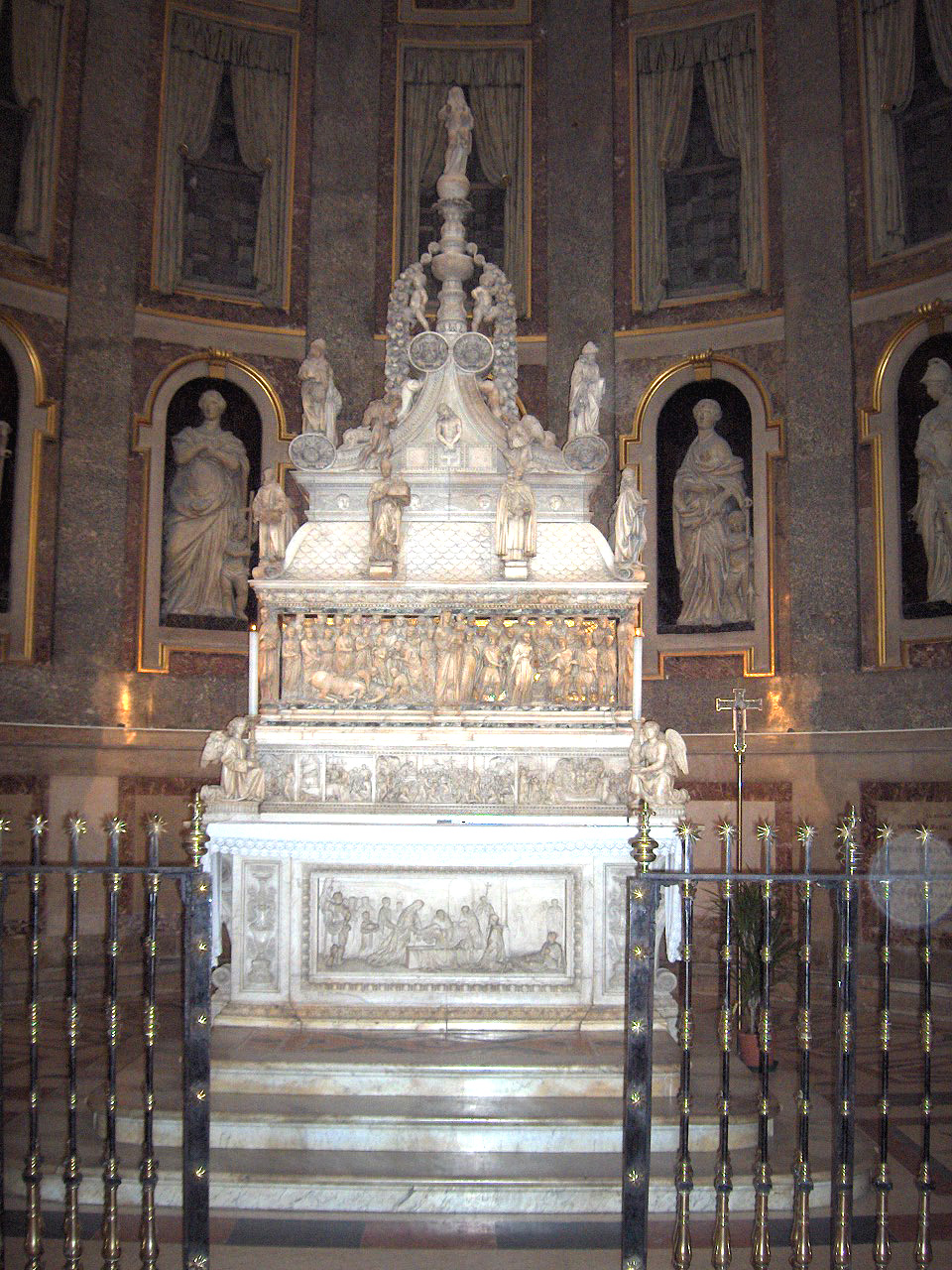
Shrine of St. Dominic, Basilica of St. Dominic, Bologna

Fra Guglielmo Agnelli OP (c. 1238–1313) was an Italian sculptor and architect, born in Pisa.

== Biography ==
Agnelli was a pupil of the well-known sculptor Nicola Pisano, who modelled on classical Greek and Roman ideas.

Agnelli was born and there joined the Dominican Order in 1257, as a lay brother. He was soon engaged in work on the convent of the brethren at Pisa and built the campanile of the Badia a Settimo, near Florence.

His best work is the series of marble reliefs executed, in collaboration with Pisano, for the famous tomb of St Dominic in the church of that Saint at Bologna. The figures on the funeral urn, in mezzo-rilievo, are about two feet high. Agnelli's work on the posterior face of the tomb deals with six Dominican legends: the Blessed Reginald smitten by a distemper; the Virgin Mary healing a sick man and selecting the habit for the Friars Preachers; the same man freed from a terrible temptation by holding St Dominic's hands; Pope Honorius III having his vision of St Dominic supporting the falling Lateran Basilica; Honorius examining the Dominican rule, and his solemn approbation of it. This work afforded little scope to Agnelli's imaginative powers, but its masterly execution raised his esteem to second only to his master, Nicola Pisano. On the other hand, the figures show some of the characteristic stiffness and lack of finish in the extremities of the time. They are also crowded. Agnelli and Nicola also embellished the upper cornice of the urn with acanthus leaves and birds.

In 1293, Agnelli worked at Orvieto Cathedral. Though his share in the sculptures of this edifice is not fully established, the bas-reliefs are attributed to him. The length of time he spent at Orvieto is also unknown. In 1304, he was engaged in works of sculpture and architecture in his native Pisa, and was called upon to adorn the facade of the Church of San Michele di Borgo with historical bas-reliefs. These labours, together with his work on other parts of that church, and the construction of a pulpit, engaged him for the remaining nine years of his life. Vincenzo Marchese describes Agnelli as not only the foremost among the Dominican sculptors, but also "among the grandest Italian sculptors, far excelling all contemporaries. Arnolfo, Giovanni Pisano, and his master excepted".
