= Saint Petronius (Michelangelo) =

Sculpture by Michelangelo

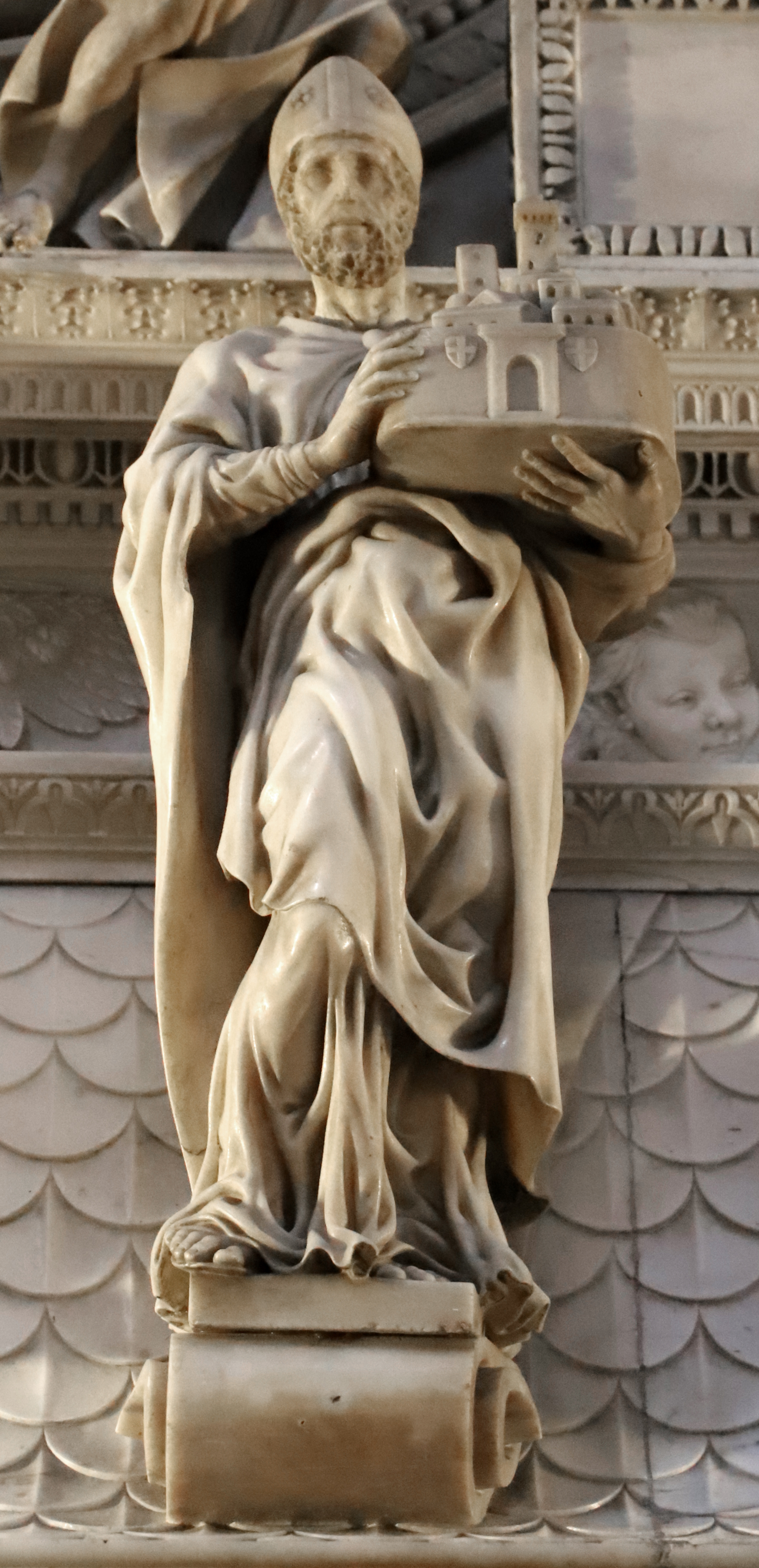
- Artist: Michelangelo
- Year: 1494–1495
- Medium: Marble
- Dimensions: 64 cm (25 in)
- Location: San Petronio; Bologna

The statue of Saint Petronius (1494–1495) was created by Michelangelo out of marble. Its height is 64 cm. It is situated in the Basilica of San Domenico, Bologna. Its subject is Saint Petronius, bishop of Bologna.

It was influenced by Jacopo della Quercia's sculpture of Saint Petronius. It is designed to be viewed from below. Work on the statue had been begun by Niccolò dell'Arca, but had remained unfinished; Michelangelo completed work on the statue.

== See also ==
- List of works by Michelangelo
