= Saint Proculus (Michelangelo) =

Sculpture by Michelangelo

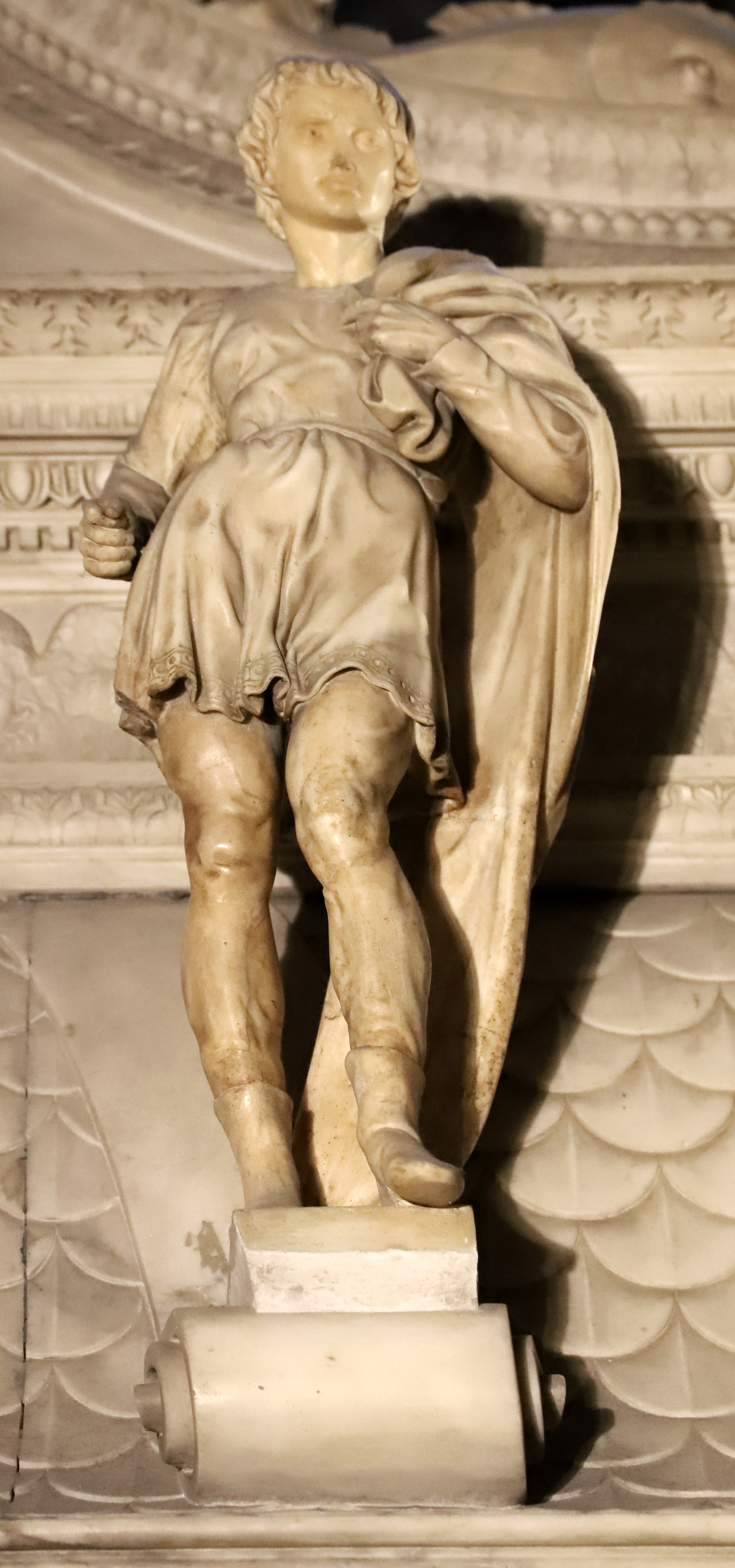
- Artist: Michelangelo
- Year: 1494–1495
- Medium: Marble
- Dimensions: 58.5 cm (23.0 in)
- Location: San Domenico; Bologna

The statue of Saint Proculus (or Saint Proclus; 1494–1495) was created by Michelangelo out of marble. Its height is 58.5 cm. It is situated in the Basilica of San Domenico, Bologna. Its subject is Saint Proculus, a martyr of Bologna.

Michelangelo may have been influenced by Niccolò dell'Arca's statue of Saint Vitalis, and possibly also by the work of Ercole de' Roberti and Francesco del Cossa. The statue of Saint Proculus shares much in composition with Michelangelo's later David.

== See also ==
- List of works by Michelangelo
