= Arnolfo di Cambio =

13th-century Italian architect and sculptor

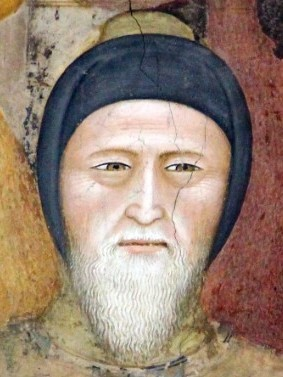
- Portrait by Andrea di Bonaiuto, c. 1366
- Born: c. 1240; Colle di Val d'Elsa
- Died: c. 1300-1310; Florence, Republic of Florence
- Occupations: Architect, sculptor, painter

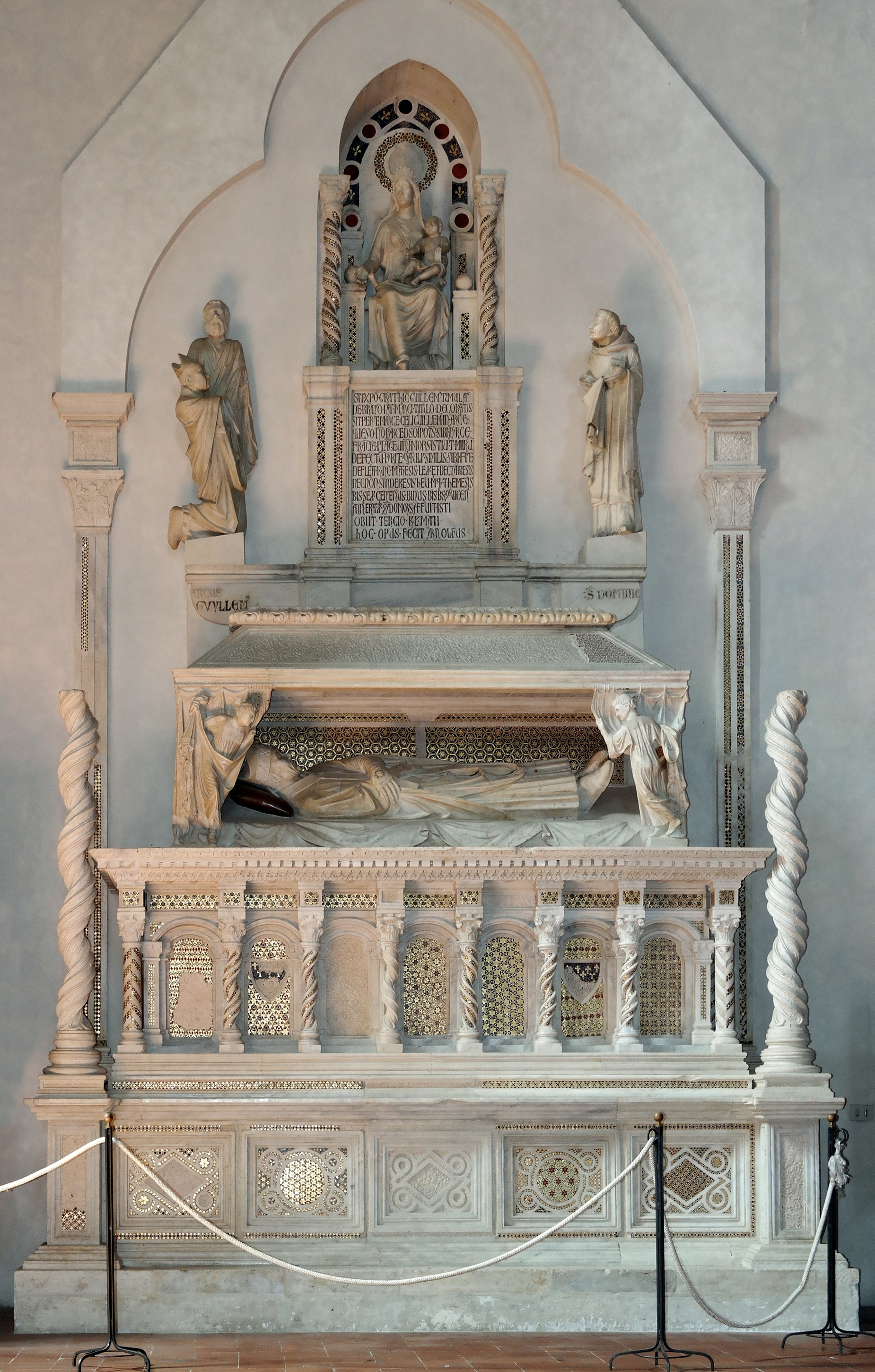
Tomb of Cardinal de Braye, Orvieto, San Domenico, c. 1282

Arnolfo di Cambio (c. 1240 – 1300/1310) was an Italian architect and sculptor of the Duecento, who began as a lead assistant to Nicola Pisano. He is documented as being capomaestro or Head of Works for Florence Cathedral in 1300, and designed the sixth city wall around Florence (1284–1333).

By the end of his career he evidently had one or more workshops of some size, producing work with considerable stylistic variation, and distinguishing his personal hand can be difficult.

== Biography ==
Arnolfo's biography is complicated by lingering uncertainties as to whether "Arnolfo di Cambio", born in Colle Val d'Elsa, Tuscany, and later Master of Works for Florence Cathedral, is the same person as "Arnolfus" who signed the ciboria of San Paolo fuori le Mura and Santa Cecilia in Trastevere in Rome, not to mention "Arnolfus Architectus" who signed the tomb of Pope Boniface VIII. The majority view is that they are the same man, and variations in style are caused by the use of workshop assistants, which many of his large works would certainly have needed. He probably had a workshop in Rome by 1277.

He was Nicola Pisano’s chief assistant on the marble Siena Cathedral Pulpit for the Duomo in Siena Cathedral (1265–1268), but he soon began to work independently on an important tomb sculpture. In 1266–1267 he worked in Rome for King Charles I of Anjou, King of Sicily, portraying him in the famous statue housed in the Campidoglio. He signed the wall tomb of Cardinal Guillaume de Braye (d. 1282) in the church of San Domenico in Orvieto, including an enthroned Madonna (a Maestà) for which he took as a model an ancient Roman statue of the goddess Abundantia; the Madonna's tiara and jewels reproduce antique models.

In Rome Arnolfo had seen the Cosmatesque art, and its influence can be seen in the intarsia and polychrome glass decorations in the Basilica of Saint Paul Outside the Walls and the church Santa Cecilia in Trastevere, where he worked in 1285 and 1293 respectively. In this period he also worked on the presepio of Santa Maria Maggiore, on Santa Maria in Aracoeli, and on the monument of Pope Boniface VIII (1300).

The bronze statue of St. Peter in St. Peter's Basilica is traditionally attributed to him, but this is often doubted. .

In 1294–1295 he worked in Florence, mainly as an architect. According to his biographer Giorgio Vasari, he was in charge of construction of the cathedral of the city, for which he provided the statues once decorating the lower part of the façade destroyed in 1589. The surviving statues are now in the Museum of the Cathedral. While the design of the Church of Santa Croce has been attributed to Arnolfo, this is highly disputed. Vasari also attributed to him the urban plan of the new city of San Giovanni Valdarno.

The monumental character of Arnolfo's work has left its mark on the appearance of Florence. His funerary monuments became the model for Gothic funerary art.

Giorgio Vasari included a biography of Arnolfo in his Lives of the Most Excellent Painters, Sculptors, and Architects.

Dante Alighieri probably makes a discrete reference to him with a double citation of the Battle at Colle Val d'Elsa, birthplace of the great artist, in the year 1269 in the Cantos XI, XIII of Purgatorio. Dante almost certainly met Arnolfo, as architect of the cathedral in Florence, at latest when Dante was prior of Florence in 1300.

== Selected works ==
=== Architecture ===
- Cathedral Santa Maria del Fiore, Florence, 1296. Arnolfo's design for the facade was extended and completed by other architects in the 14th and 15th centuries. It has now been reconstructed in part in the Cathedral Museum.
- Palazzo Vecchio in Florence, 1299.
- Ciborium of Santa Cecilia in Trastevere, Rome
- Ciborium of Saint Paul Outside the Walls, Rome, completed 1285 and signed "Arnolfus cum suo socio Petro".

=== Sculpture ===
- Monument to Cardinal Riccardo Annibaldi (1276), San Giovanni in Laterano, Rome. This was the first major work of Arnolfo in Rome.
- Monument to Pope Adrian V (1276, attributed), San Francesco, Viterbo
- Statue of Charles I of Anjou (c. 1277), Capitoline Museums, Rome.
- Fountain of the Thirsty People (Fontana Minore), Perugia
- Tomb of Cardinal Guillaume de Bray († 1282), San Domenico, Orvieto
- Monument of Pope Boniface VIII, Vatican crypt (Grottoes)
- St. Peter Enthroned inside St. Peter's Basilica, is often attributed to Arnolfo.

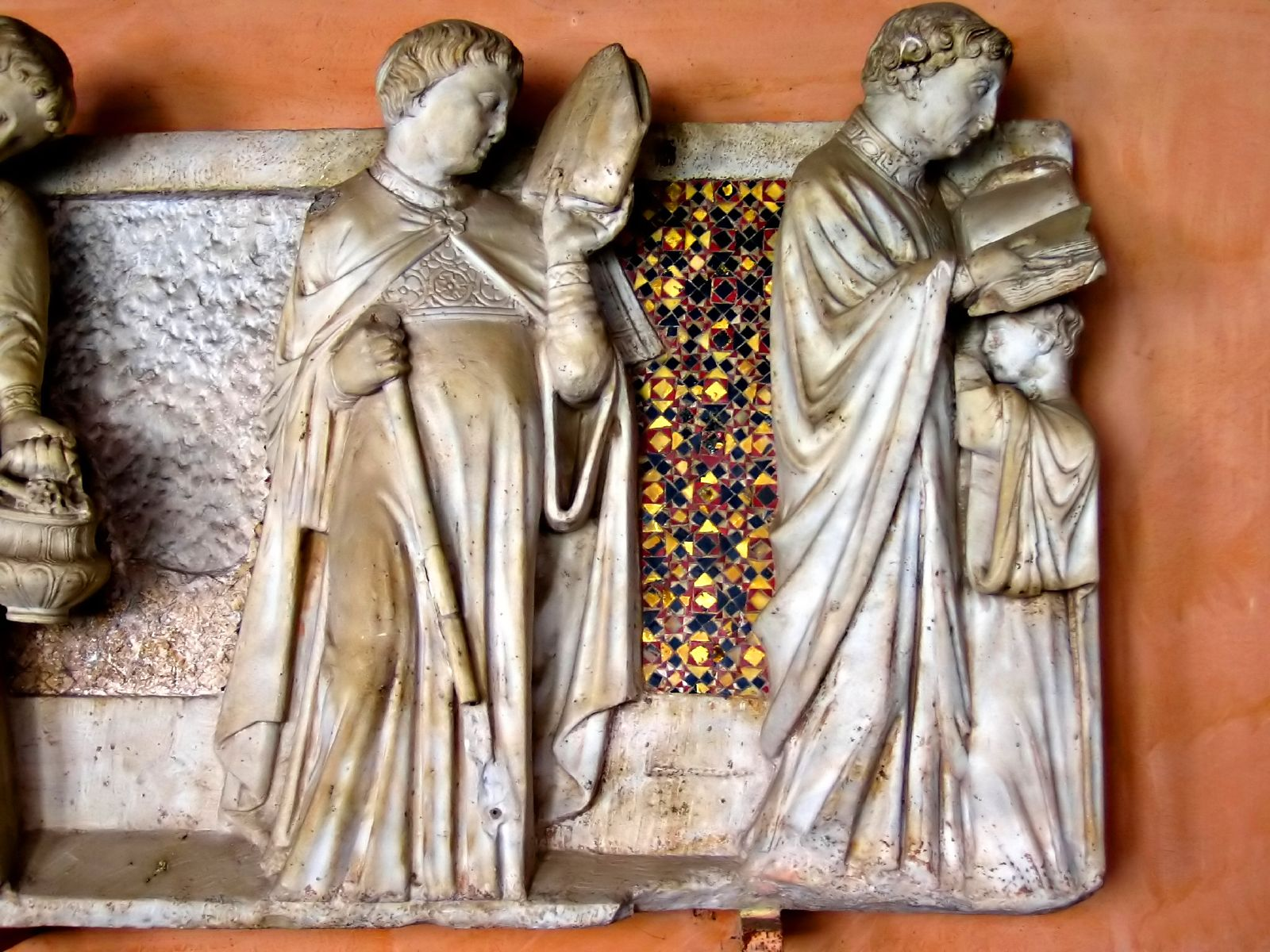
Detail of the Tomb of Riccardo Cardinal Annibaldi, at St. John Lateran

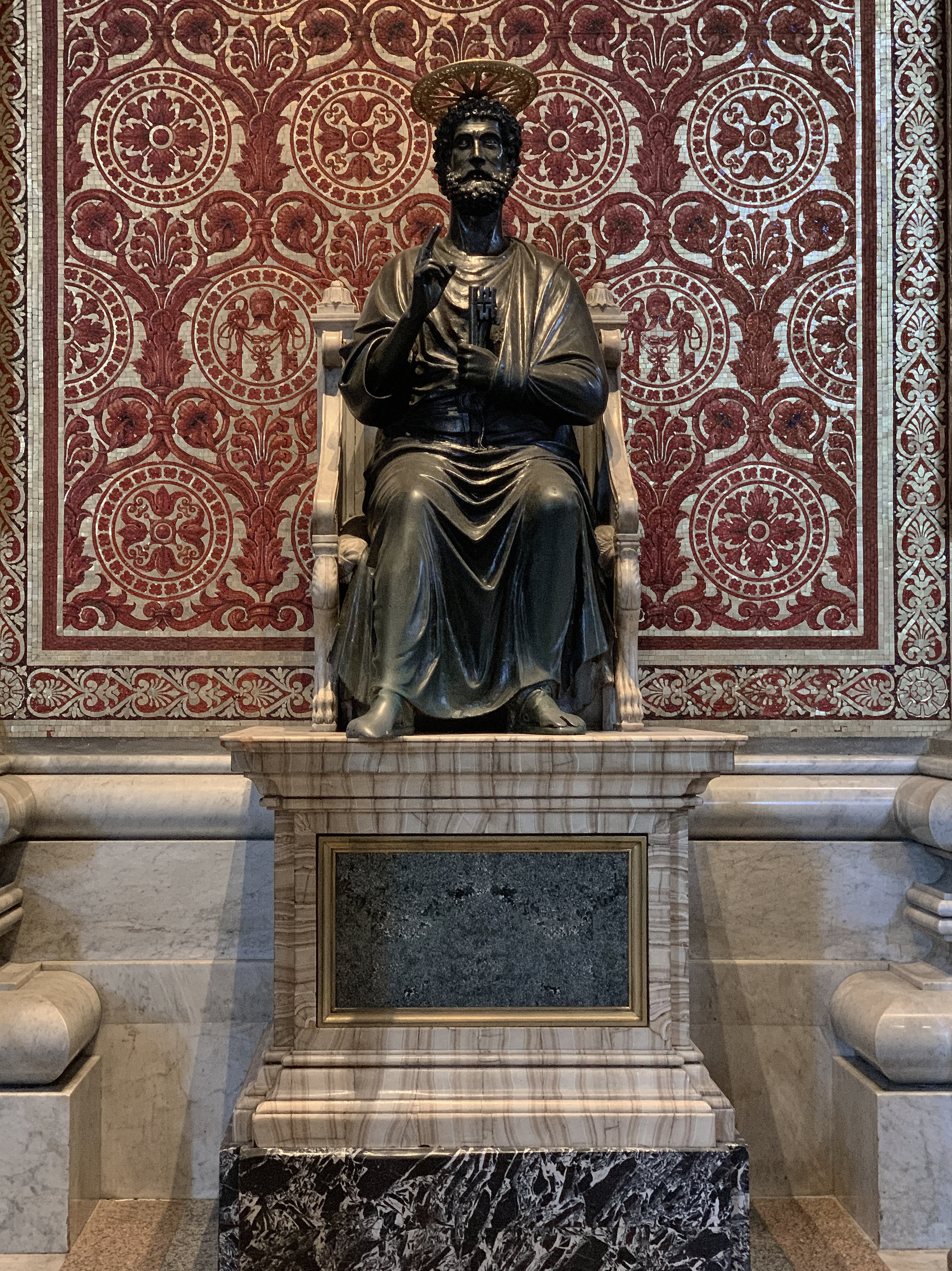
St. Peter Enthroned, 1290–99, St. Peter's Basilica, Rome

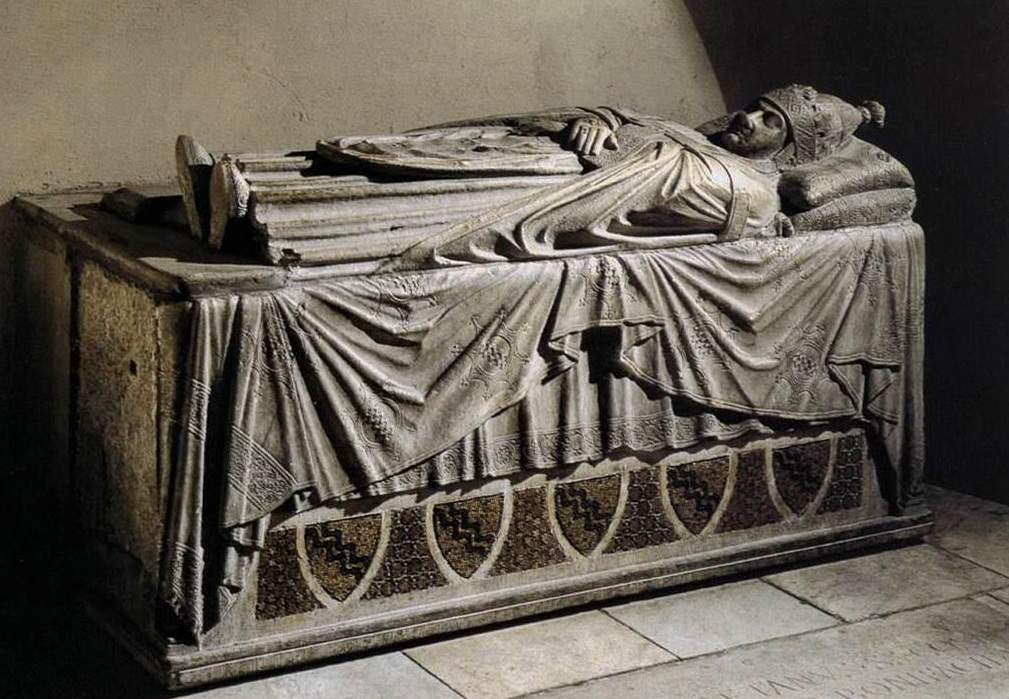
Tomb of Pope Boniface VIII († 1303), Vatican Grottoes

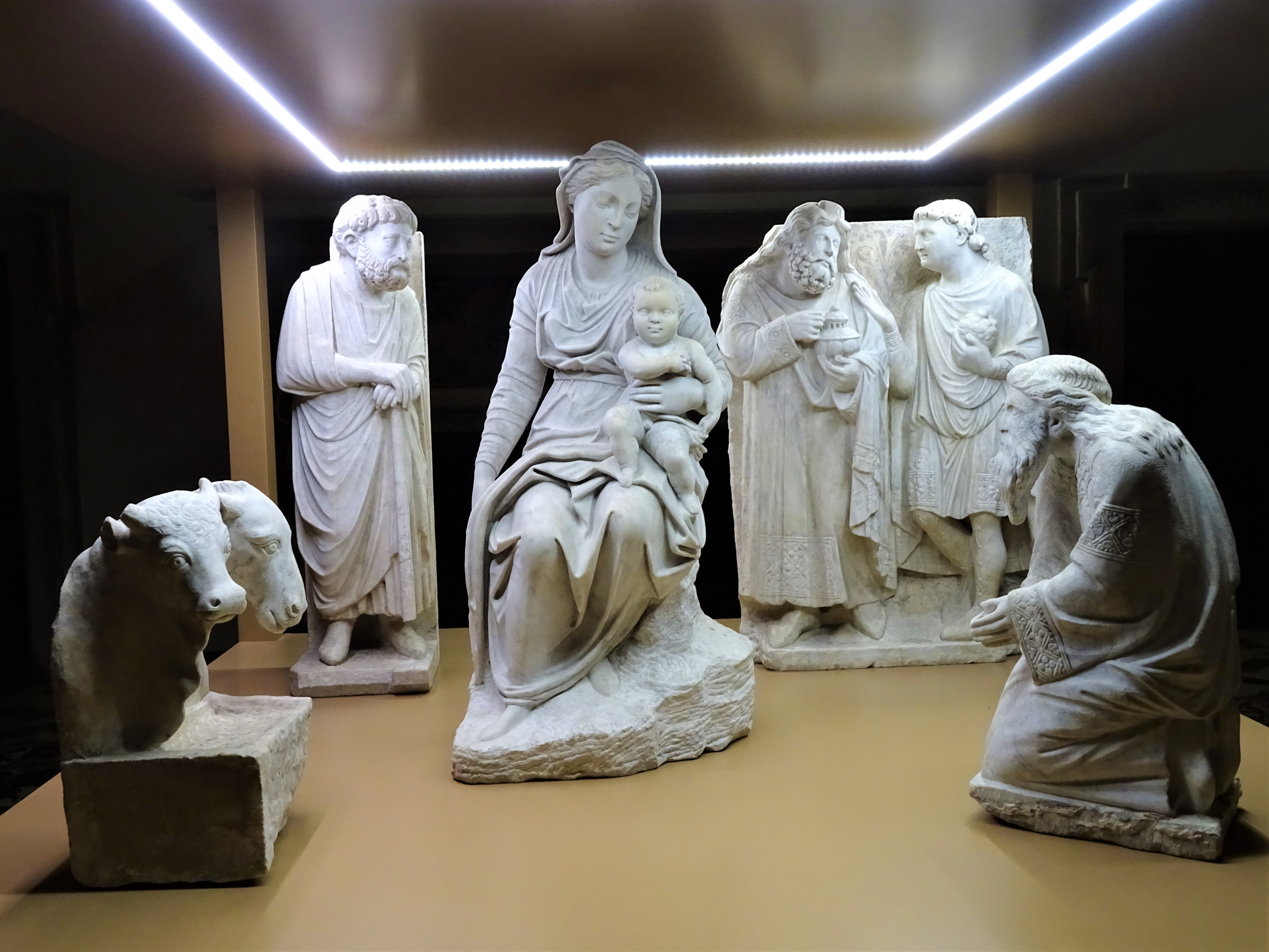
Crib group, Santa Maria Maggiore, Rome

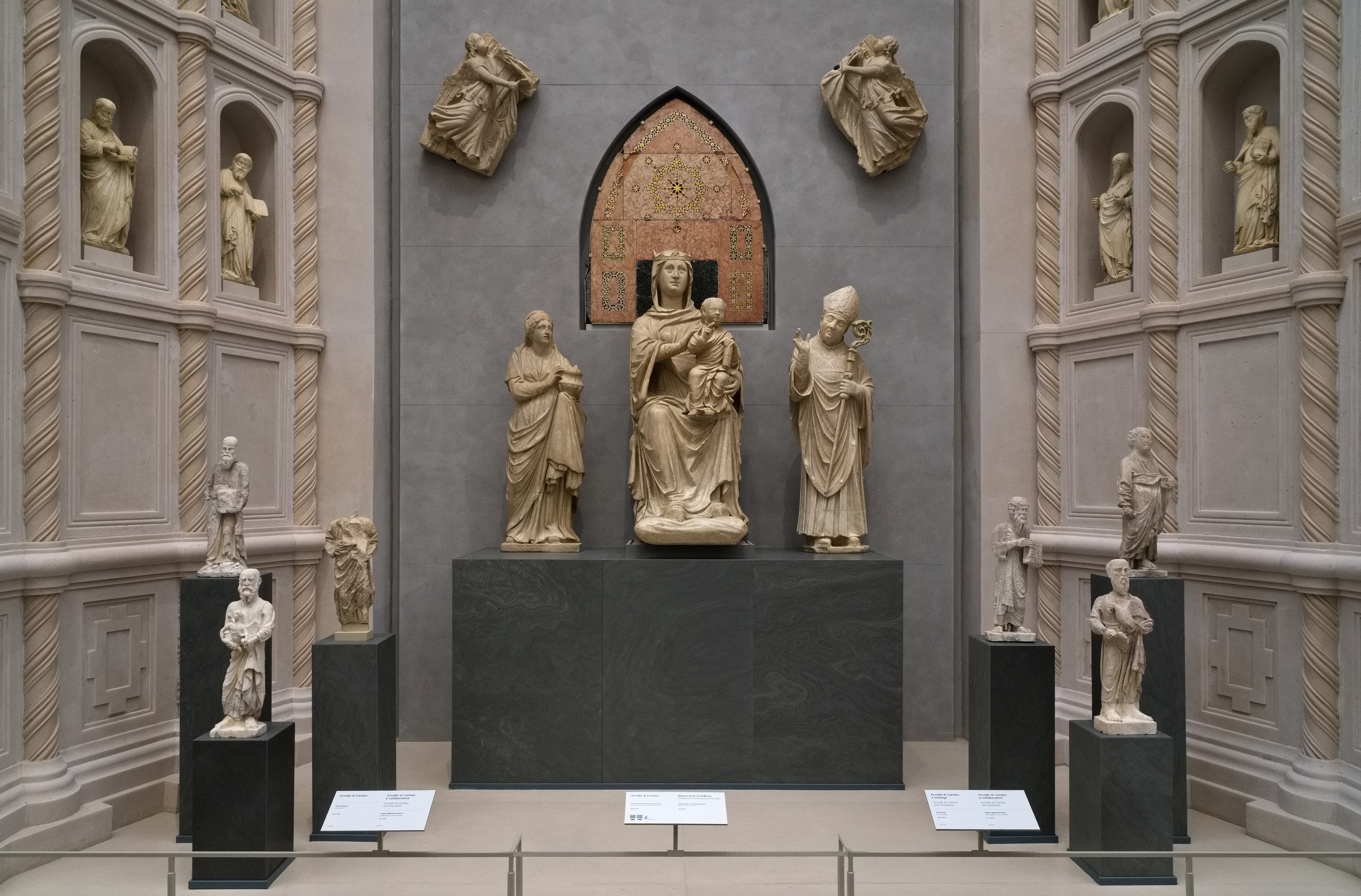
Madonna with the Glass Eyes between SS Reparata and Zanobi, 1300–10, Florence Cathedral Museum

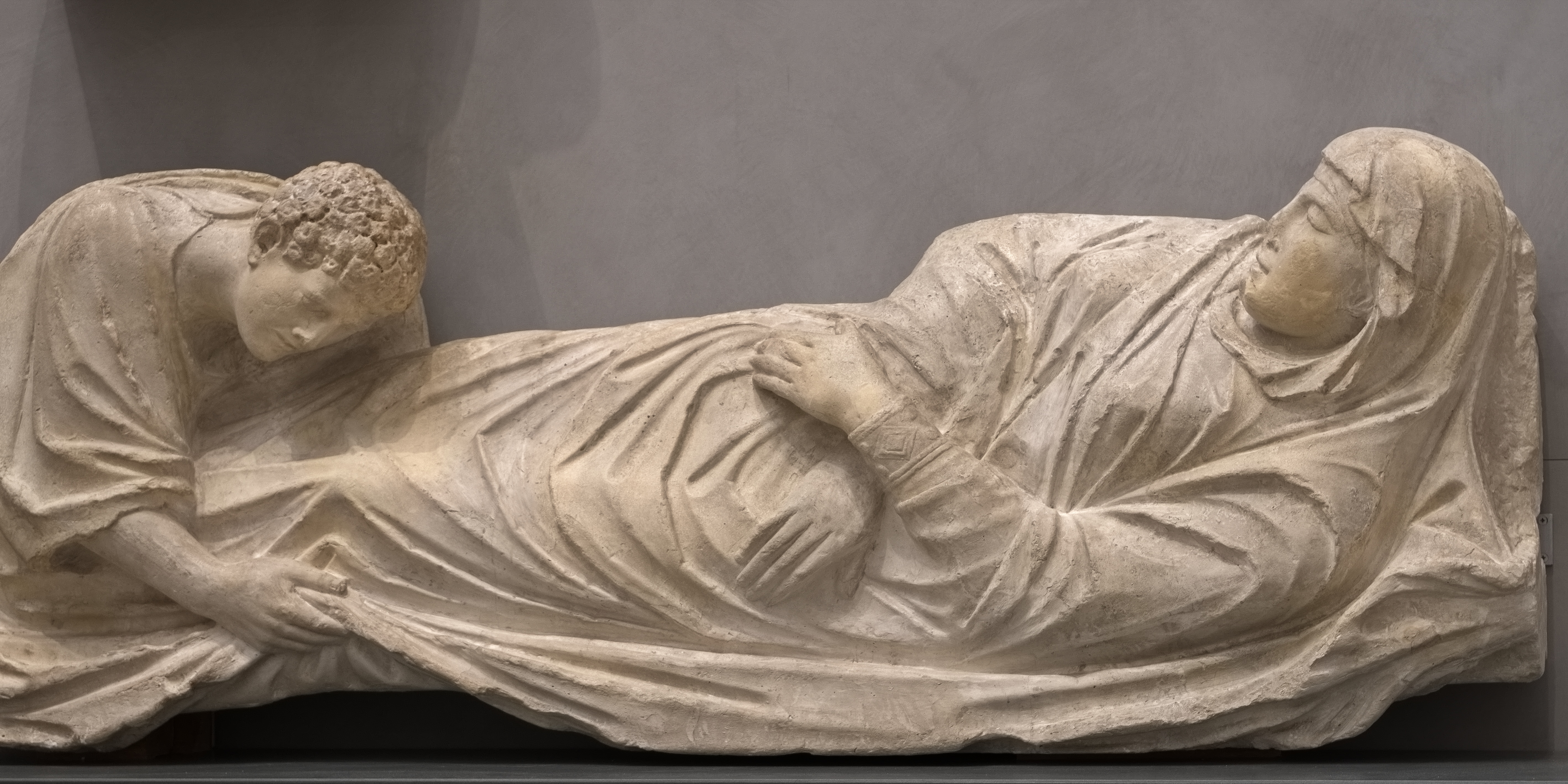
Dormitio virginis, 1300–10, Florence Cathedral Museum

== Sources ==
- Tomasi, Michele (February 2007). "Lo stil novo del Gotico italiano". Medioevo (121): 32–46.
- White, John. Art and Architecture in Italy, 1250 to 1400, London, Penguin Books, 1966, 3rd edn 1993 (now Yale History of Art series). ISBN 0300055854
