= Lavinia Fontana =

Italian artist (1552–1614)

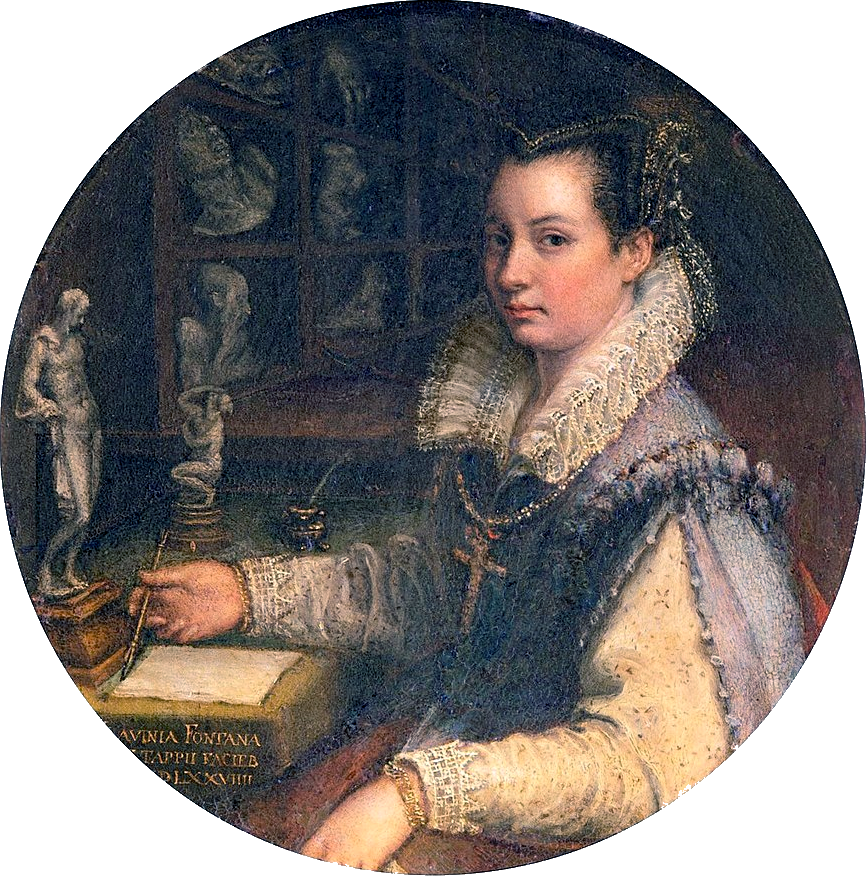
- Self-Portrait in the Studio, 1579
- Born: Bologna, Papal States
- Baptised: 24 August 1552
- Died: 11 August 1614 (aged 61); Rome, Papal States
- Resting place: Santa Maria sopra Minerva, Rome
- Education: Prospero Fontana; Denis Calvaert; Ludovico Carracci; University of Bologna
- Movement: Mannerism
- Spouse: Gian Paolo Zappi (m. 1577)
- Children: 11
- Father: Prospero Fontana
- Elected: Accademia di San Luca
- Patrons: Pope Gregory XIII; Pope Clement VII; Pope Paul V

Lavinia Fontana (baptised 24 August 1552 – 11 August 1614) was an Italian Mannerist painter active in Bologna and Rome. She is best known for her successful portraiture, but also worked in the genres of mythology and religious painting. She was trained by her father, Prospero Fontana. She is regarded as the first female career artist in Western Europe, as she relied on commissions for her income. Her family relied on her career as a painter, and her husband served as her agent and raised their 11 children. She was perhaps the first female artist to paint female nudes, but this is a topic of controversy among art historians.

== Biography ==
=== Education and career in Bologna ===
Lavinia Fontana was born in Bologna in 1552 to Antonia de' Bonardis and Prospero Fontana. She was baptized on 24 August 1552, at the cathedral of San Pietro. Her elder sister Emilia died in 1568 when Lavinia was sixteen. Prospero was a prominent painter of the School of Bologna and served as her teacher. Caroline P. Murphy suspects that financial issues may have prompted Prospero to train Lavinia as a painter. She later studied under the Netherlandish artist Denis Calvaert, who had once been a pupil of Prospero and who ran an influential painting school in Bologna.

Her earliest known work, Child of the Monkey, was painted in 1575 at the age of 23. Though this work is now lost, another early painting, Christ with the Symbols of the Passion, painted in 1576, is now in the El Paso Museum of Art. Being the daughter of a painter allowed Fontana to become an artist in a time where female artists were not widely accepted, and Bolognese society at large was supportive of Fontana's artistic career, providing opportunities and connections that were not available to women in other locales. She began her commercial practice by painting small devotional paintings on copper, which had popular appeal as papal and diplomatic gifts, given the value and lustre of the metal.

Fontana married the Count of Imola, Gian Paolo Zappi, (alternate spellings include Giovan and Fappi), one of her father's pupils, in June 1577. Unusual for the time, their marriage contract specified that she would continue her career and would not be responsible for housekeeping. Instead of offering a dowry as would have been widely accepted in this time, Fontana painted to earn an income. The couple moved into Prospero's house in Bologna and Lavinia added Zappi to her signature. She gave birth to 11 children, though only 3 outlived her: Flaminio, Orazio, and Prospero. Zappi took care of the household and served as an agent and painting assistant to his wife, including painting minor elements of paintings such as draperies. Fontana attended classes at the University of Bologna, and was listed as one of the city's Donne addottrinate (women with doctorates) in 1580.

In the 1580s, she gained renown as a portraitist of Bolognese noblewomen, who competed for her services. The high demand for portraits painted by Fontana was reflected in the large sums of money she earned during this period. Her relationships with female clients were often unusually warm; multiple women who sat for portraits, such as Costanza Sforza, Duchess of Sora, later served as namesakes or godmothers for Fontana's children.

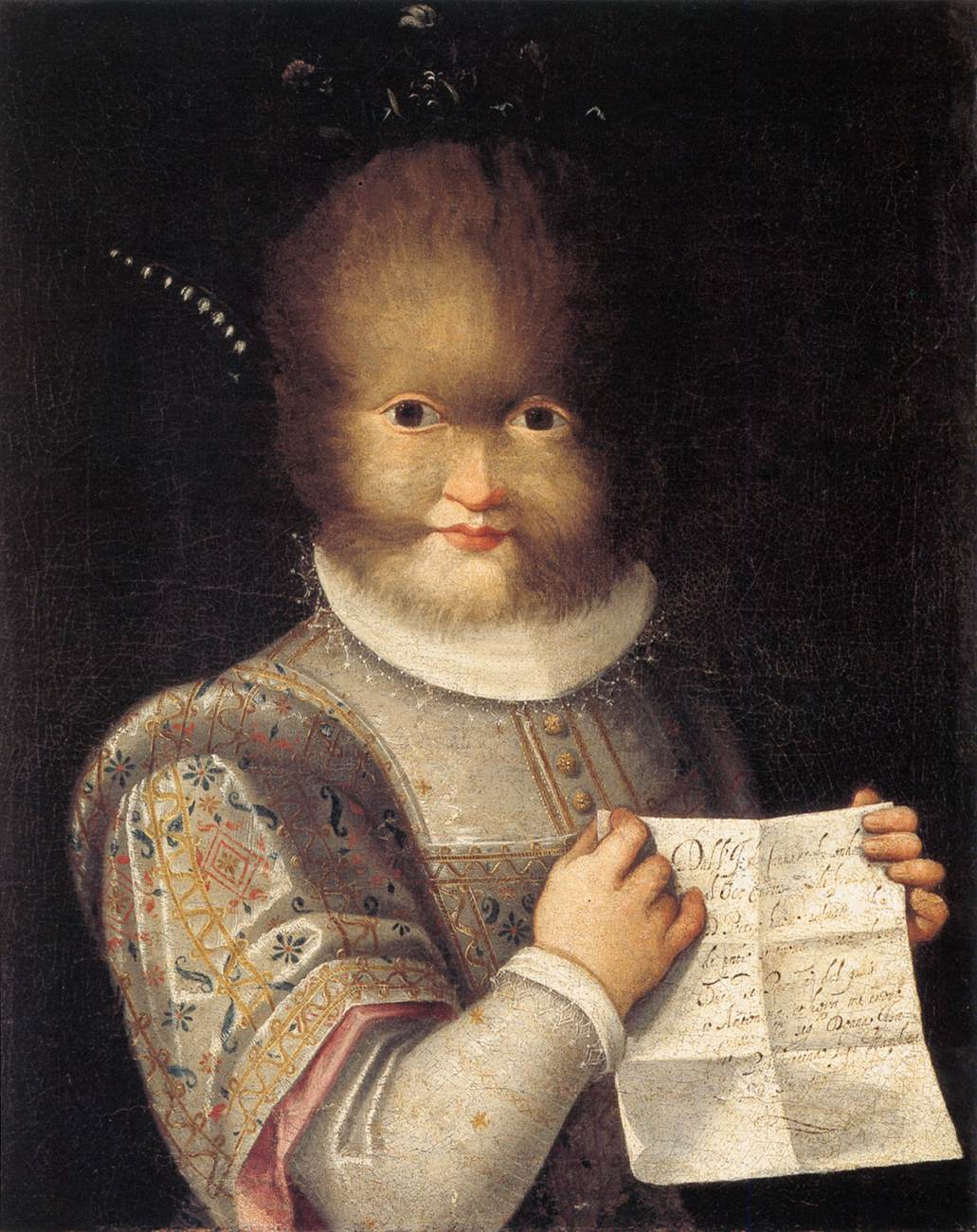
Portrait of Antonietta Gonsalvus, daughter of Petrus Gonsalvus, 1595, Musée des Beaux-Arts de Blois.

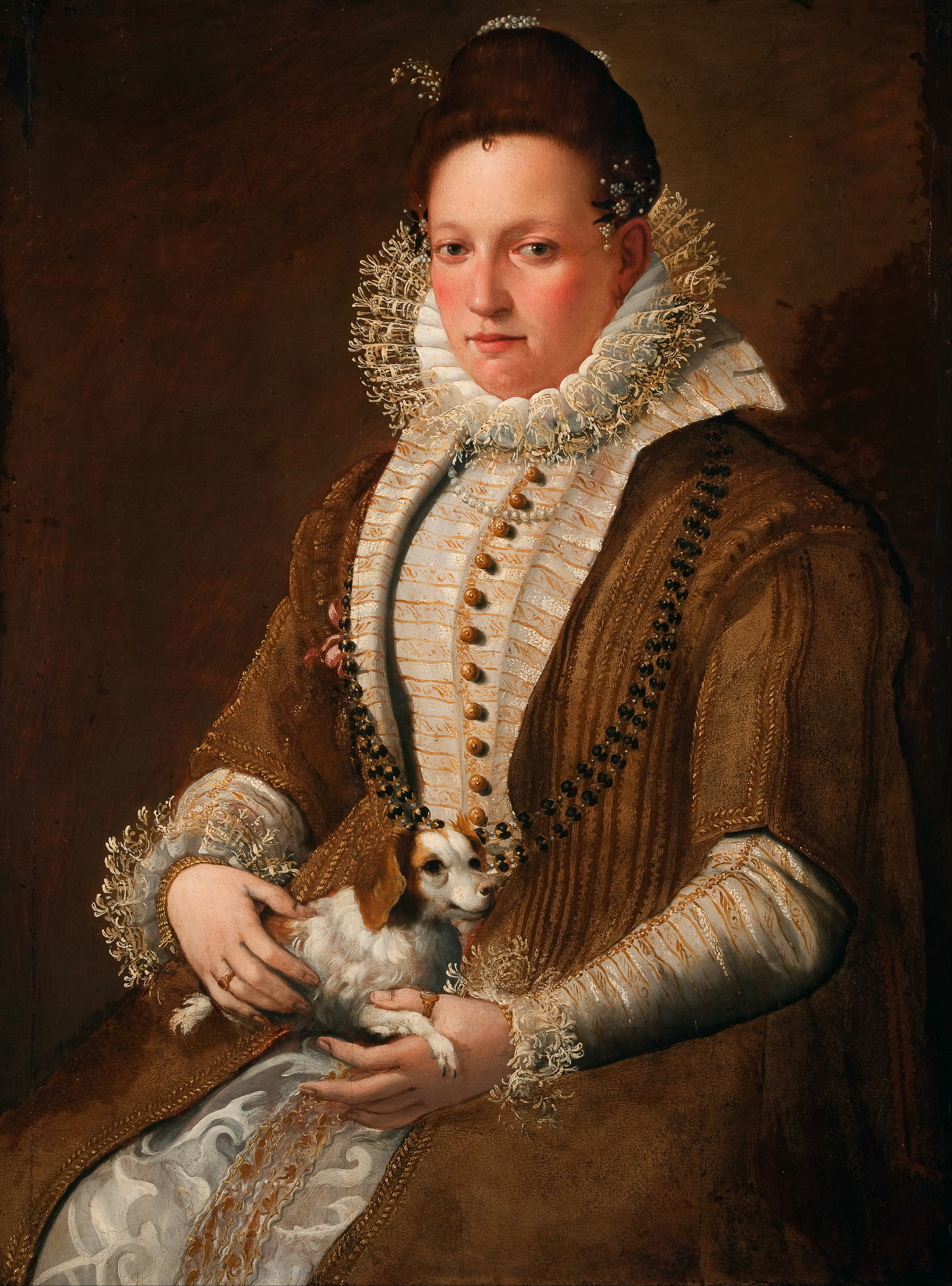
Portrait of a lady with a dog, 1590s, Auckland Art Gallery.

=== Roman period (1603–1614) ===
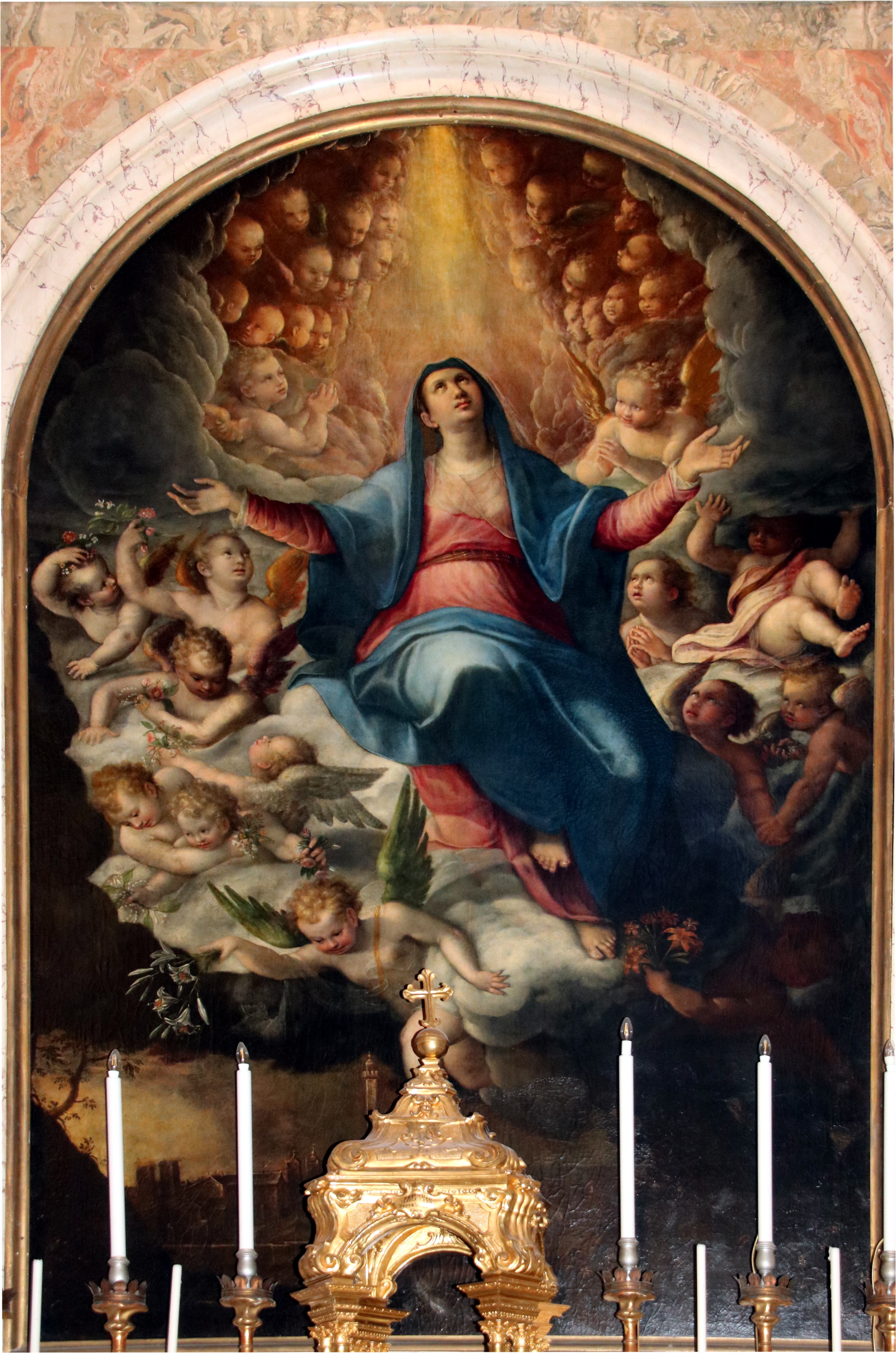
Assumption of the Virgin, 1593, Pieve di Cento, Collegiata di Santa Maria Maggiore, Bologna.

Fontana and her family moved to Rome in 1604 at the invitation of Pope Clement VIII. She gained the patronage of the House of Boncompagni, of which Pope Gregory XIII was a member. She was subsequently appointed as Portraitist in Ordinary at the Vatican. Fontana thrived in Rome as she had in Bologna and Pope Paul V was among her sitters.

Along with portraits, Fontana created a substantial number of extensive altarpieces, and it is believed that she may be one of the first female painters to have done this. Fontana followed Cardinal Gabriele Paleotti's Counter-Reformation principles in art theory. In 1593, Cardinal Paleotti commissioned the Assumption of the Virgin, created by Fontana for the chapel altarpiece of Bologna Cathedral. Fontana painted another Assumption of the Virgin in 1593 at the church of San Francesco Oltre Reno at Pieve di Cento, which was commissioned by the Bentivoglio family and placed in the family chapel. Fontana was also commissioned for works by two popes, Gregory XIII and Clement VIII.

Fontana also produced paintings on mythological allegorical themes, sometimes "highly sensuous paintings with female nude figures—an unheard-of and risky venture which to date no female artist had permitted herself to attempt."

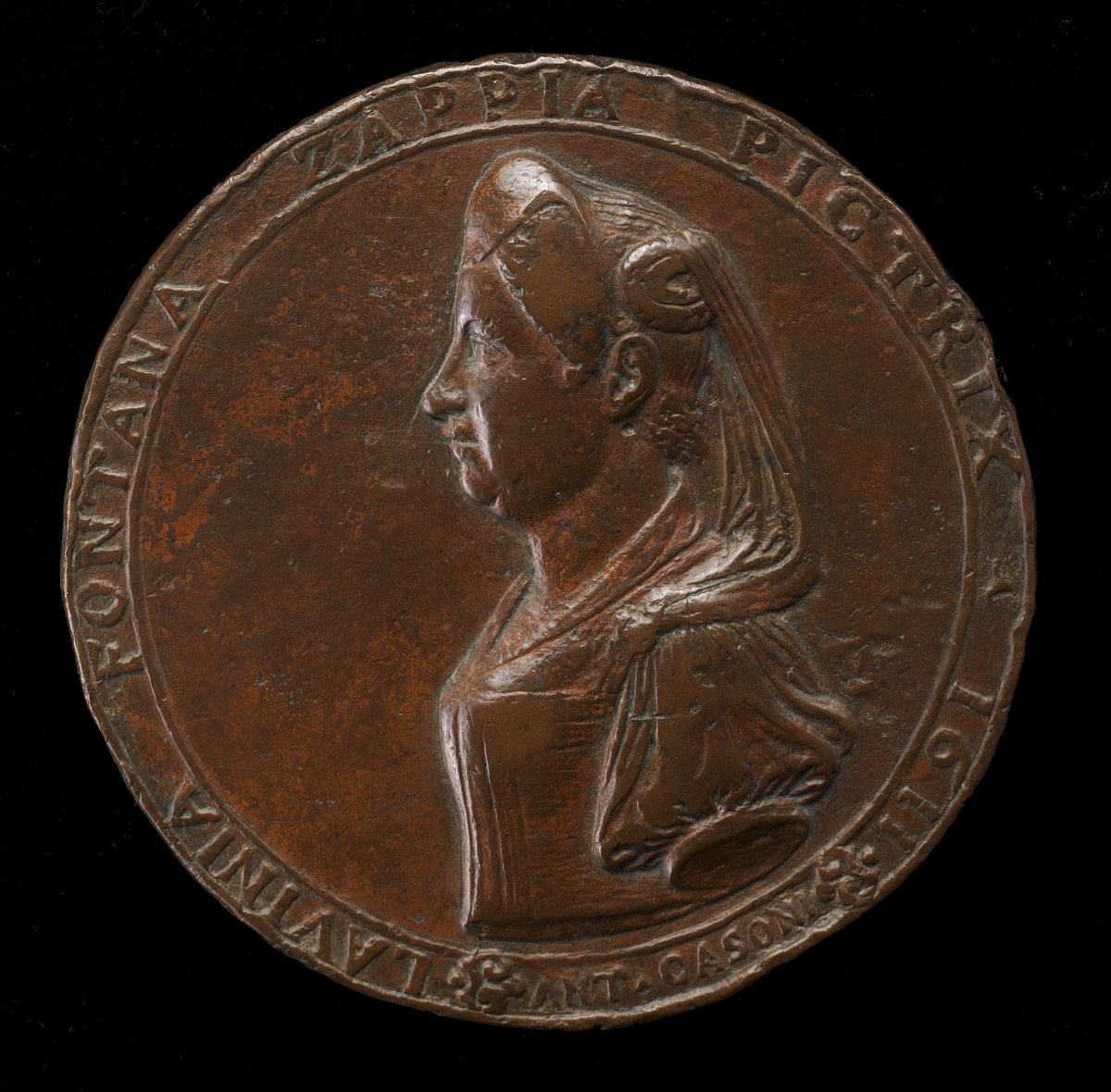
Portrait medal of Lavinia Fontana by Felice Antonio Casone, 1611.

She was the first female elected into the Accademia di San Luca of Rome, and was the recipient of numerous honors, including a bronze portrait medallion cast in 1611 by sculptor and architect Felice Antonio Casoni. According to Jean Owens Schaefer, the reverse side of the medal depicts Pittura, an allegorical figure representing painting. He also posits that this is the first visual rendition of Cesare Ripa's 1603 description of Pittura.

She died in the city of Rome on 11 August 1614, at the age of 61, and was buried at Santa Maria sopra Minerva.

== Artistic influences and style ==
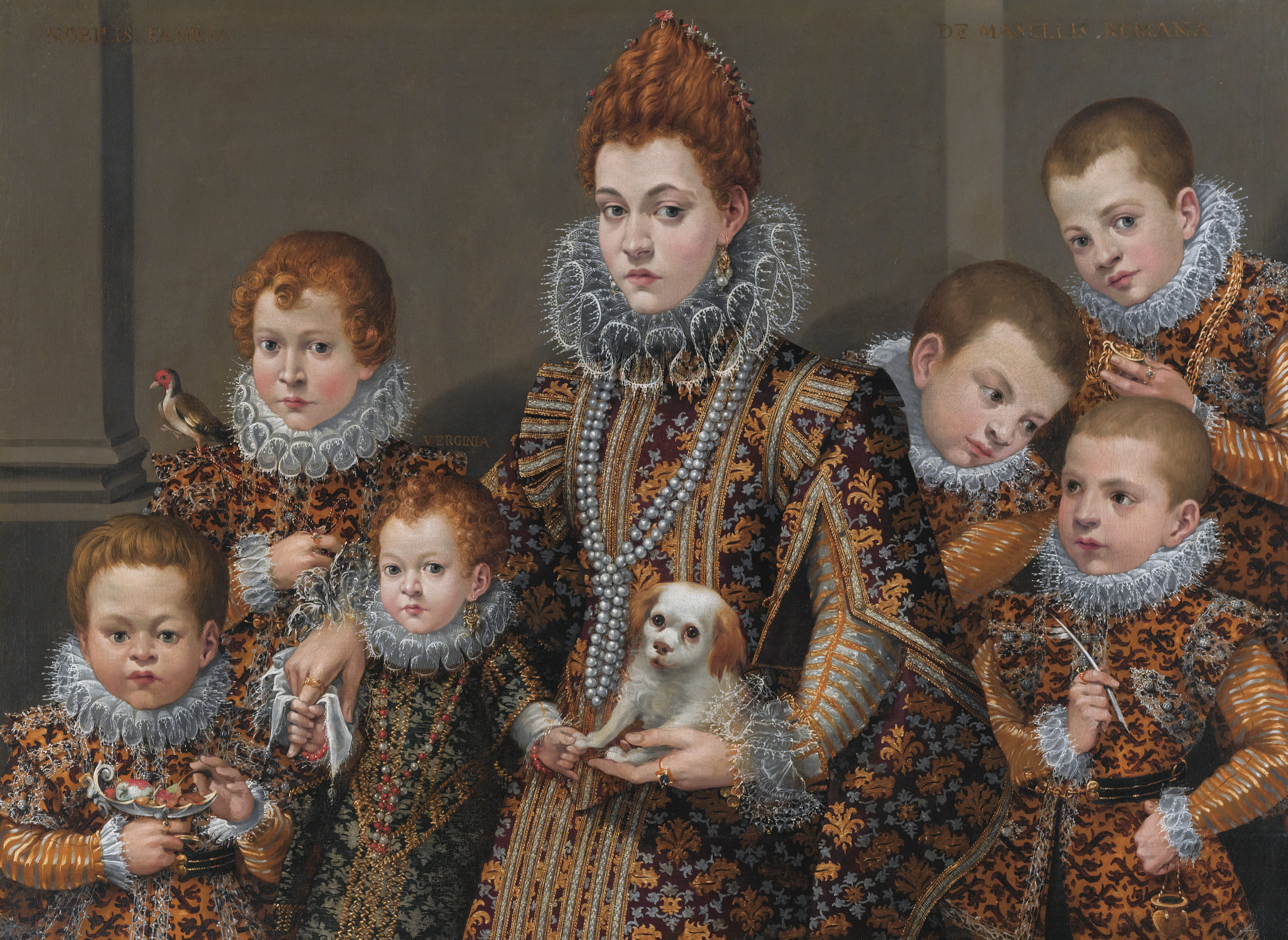
Portrait of Bianca degli Utili Maselli and Her Children, c. 1604–5, Legion of Honor, San Francisco.

Fontana's youthful style resembled that of her father, Prospero. As a student of Ludovico Carracci, she gradually adopted the Carracciesque style, with strong quasi-Venetian colouring.

Sofonisba Anguissola, Caterina Vigri, and Properzia de' Rossi may have influenced Fontana's artistic career.

The Counter-Reformation and the Council of Trent's recommendations for religious art defined Fontana's treatment of subjects and themes in her paintings. Excellent status as a daughter, wife, and mother was a prerequisite to her career due to the moral standards of the day. Demand for portraits of family and children rose due to the Roman Catholic Church's emphasis on family values.

The influence of Mannerism is noticeable in Fontana's close attention to detail in her paintings and the significance of the materials surrounding the subject. Her close attention to detail displayed the wealth of the sitter, which made her popular among the rich.

Fontana's self-portraiture strikes a balance between presenting the artist as a distinguished lady and as a professional artist. This depiction of two coexisting roles was common for sixteenth-century women artists.

== Legacy ==
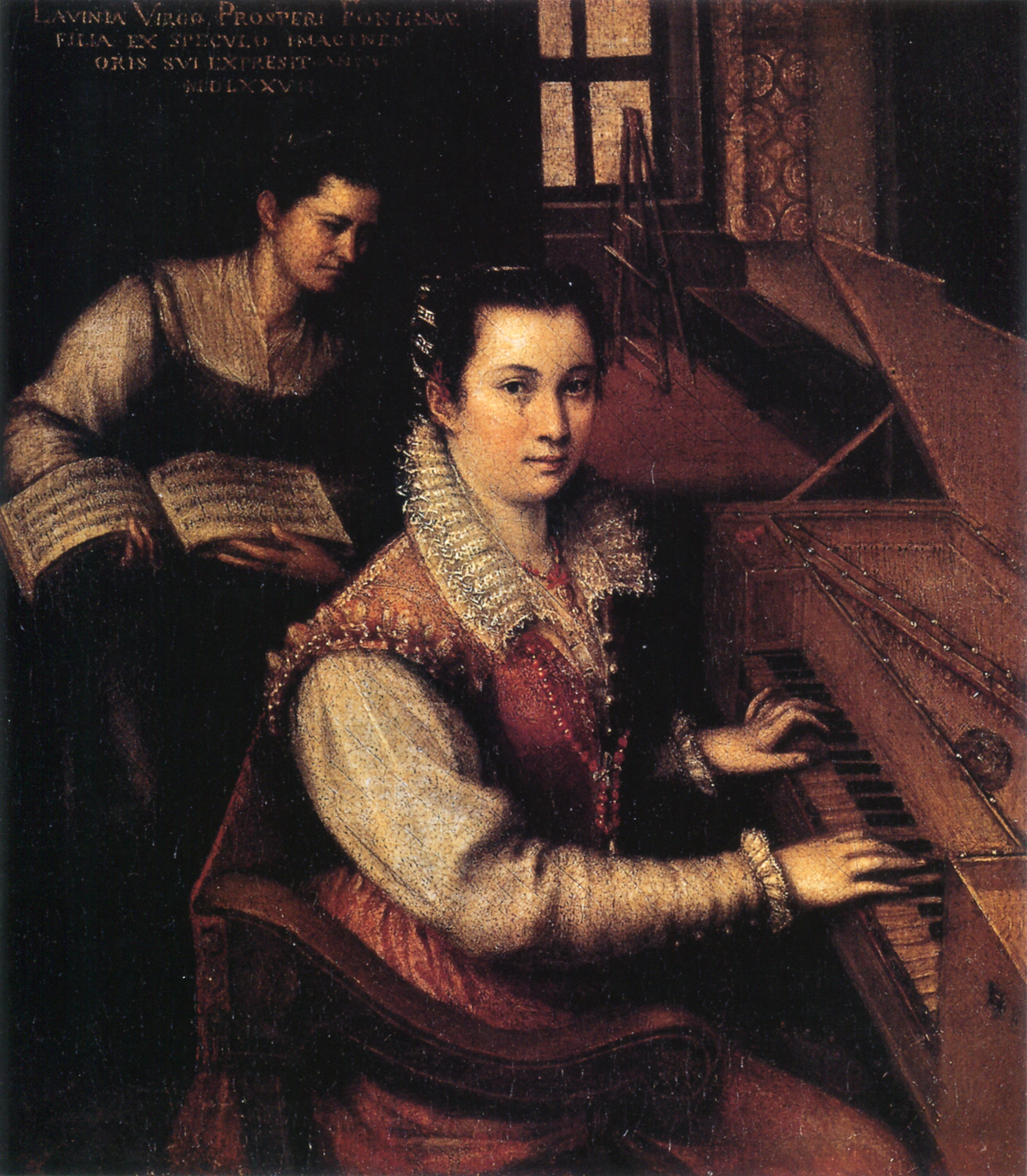
Self-Portrait at the Virginal with a Servant, 1577, Accademia di San Luca, Rome.

Fontana has been called "the most significant and prolific female artist of the 16th century."

Fontana's Self-Portrait at the Virginal with a Servant is considered to be her masterpiece. It was painted as a betrothal gift to the Zappi family, as evidenced by the Latin inscription in which Fontana describes herself as a virgin and states that she painted while looking at herself in a mirror, a testament to the accuracy of the depiction. (Lavinia Virgo Prosperi Fontane/Filia Ex Speculo Imaginem/Oris Sui Expressit Anno/MDLXXVII.)

Over 100 works by Fontana are documented, but only 32 signed and dated works are known today. Twenty-five more works have been attributed to her, making hers the largest oeuvre for any female artist prior to 1700. Some of her portraits were once wrongly attributed to her contemporary Guido Reni, another pupil of Denis Calvaert. Portrait of a Gentleman, His Daughter and a Servant, originally attributed to Pieter Pourbus, is now attributed to Fontana.

Fontana's mythology paintings with nude figures are being increasingly studied by art historians. Roman gods such as Minerva, Mars, and Venus are depicted in various forms of undress in these paintings. There is little or no evidence that contemporary women artists depicted nude figures in such a way. It has been said that Fontana's depictions of mythology may be the first involvement of a female artist in the genre. Fontana "excelled in composing a new theme for female painters of her time to follow, that is, the depiction of mythological subjects, in particular the portrayal of nude female figures, as seen in her nude Minervas and Venuses. Fontana's new genre paved the way for Artemisia Gentileschi's depictions of female nudes in the seventeenth century.

She was the only woman artist featured in Giulio Mancini's Considerazioni sulla pittura (Considerations on Painting). The naturalism of her paintings is highly praised, and the beauty of her paintings is linked to her own physical attractiveness.

Fontana influenced Alberto de' Rossi and Alessandro Tiarini. Aurelio Bonelli may have studied under her.

== Controversy ==
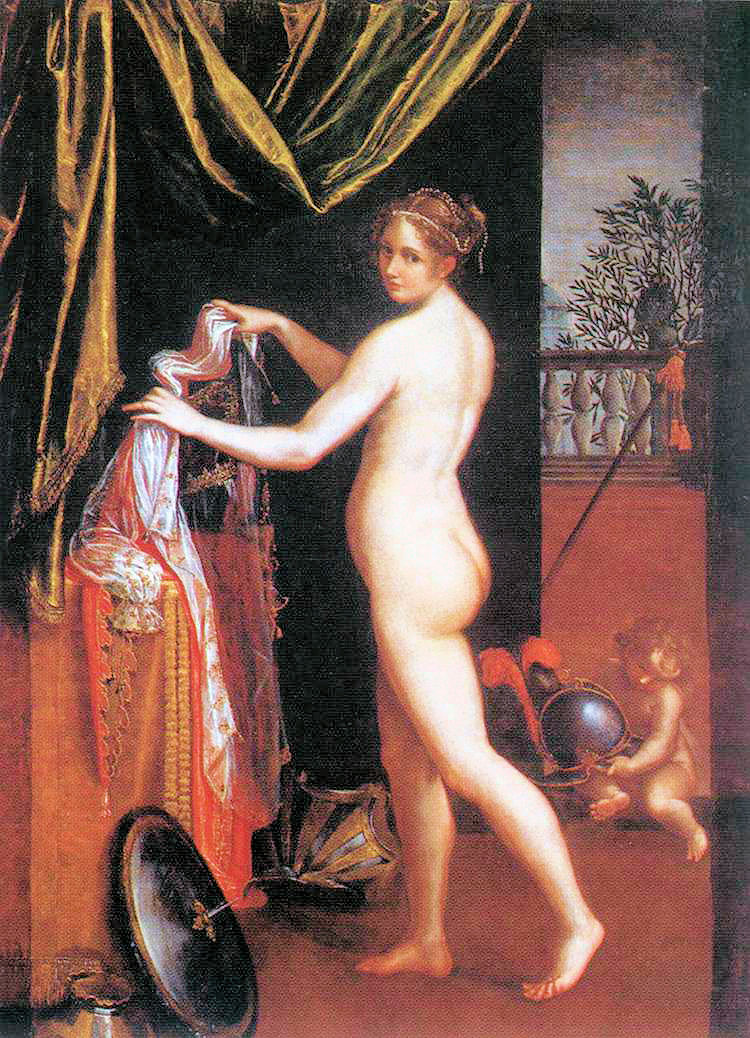
Minerva Dressing, 1613, Galleria Borghese, Rome.

=== Nudity ===
Among art historians, there is a controversy regarding the means and models used by Fontana to depict male and female nudes in her paintings. Fontana had studied her father's collection of sculptures and plaster casts, but Liana De Girolami Cheney argues that the naturalism of the figures may indicate that Fontana used live nude models. Caroline P. Murphy argues that while body parts are well rendered, the figures as a whole are disproportionate, similar to Prospero's rendering of human anatomy. Additionally, Murphy points out that during Fontana's lifetime, it was socially unacceptable for women to be exposed to nudity; if it was discovered that she used live nude models, her reputation would be tarnished. Murphy suggests that, like Sofonisba Anguissola, Fontana had family members model for her. Linda Nochlin writes that art academies barred women from viewing any nude body, despite this being a crucial part of an artist's training.

== In museums ==
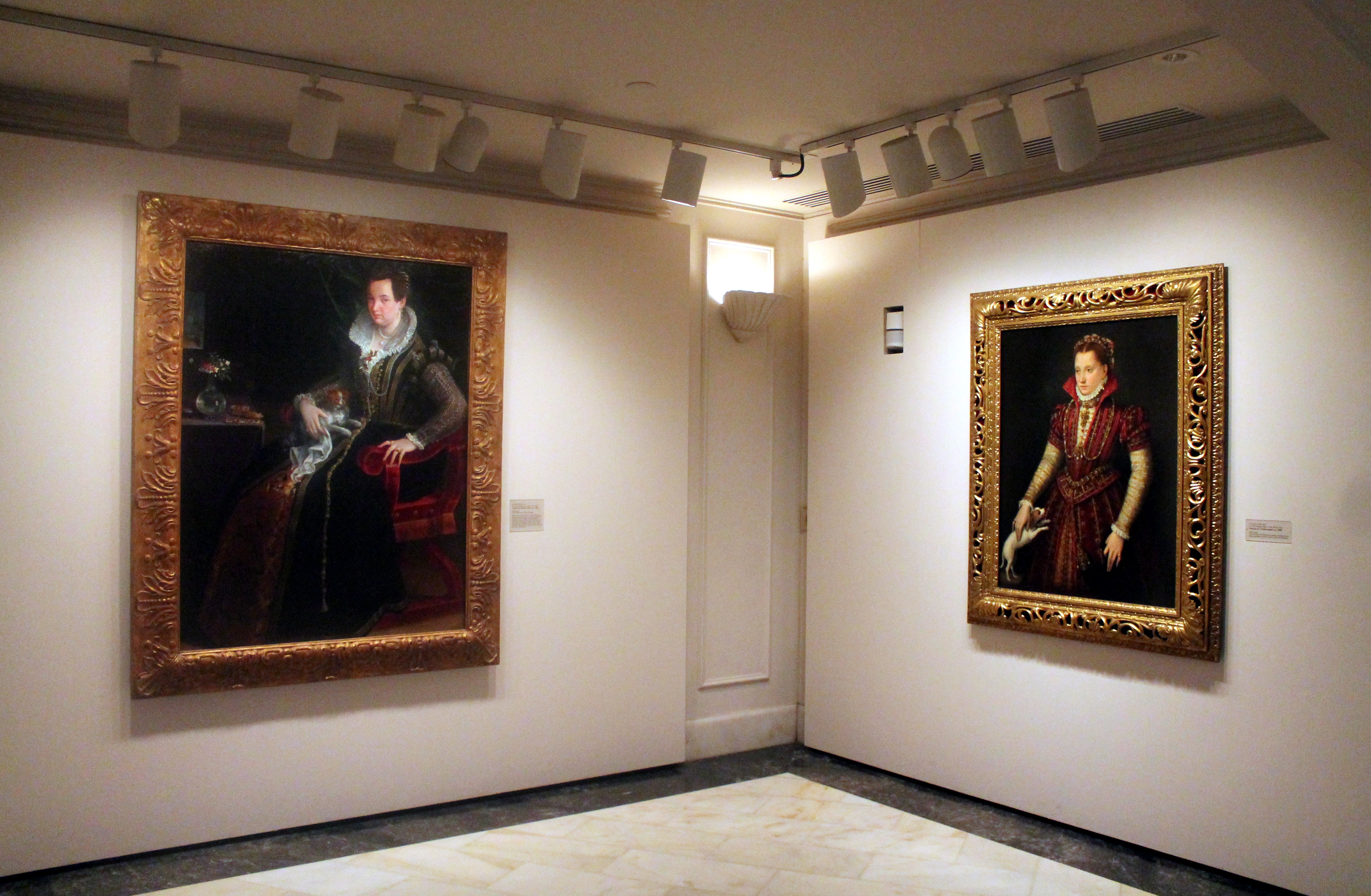
Two paintings of Lavinia Fontana exhibited at the National Museum of Women in the Arts: Portrait of Costanza Alidosi and Marriage Portrait of a Bolognese Noblewoman.

- Self-Portrait at the Virginal with a Servant, 1577 – Accademia di San Luca, Rome
- Portrait of a Noblewoman, c. 1580 – National Museum of Women in the Arts, Washington, D.C.
- Portrait of a Couple, 1580–1585 – Cleveland Museum of Art, Cleveland
- The Dead Christ with Symbols, 1581 – Cornell Fine Arts Museum, Winter Park, Florida
- Newborn Baby in a Crib c. 1583 – Pinacoteca Nazionale di Bologna
- Portrait of the Gozzadini Family, 1584 – Pinacoteca Nazionale di Bologna
- Portrait of Gerolamo Mercuriale, c. 1587–1590 – Walters Art Museum, Baltimore
- Holy Family, 1589 – El Escorial, Outside Madrid
- Portrait of a Lady with Lap Dog, c. 1595 – Walters Art Museum, Baltimore
- Portrait of Costanza Alidosi, c. 1595 – National Museum of Women in the Arts, Washington, D.C.
- The Visit of the Queen of Sheba to King Solomon, 1599 – National Gallery of Ireland, Dublin
- Mars and Venus, c. 1600–1610 – Fundación Casa de Alba, Madrid
- Minerva Dressing, 1613 – Galleria Borghese, Rome
- Birth of Virgin – Santissima Trinità, Bologna
- Consecration to the Virgin – Musee des Beaux-Arts, Marseilles, originally the Gnetti Chapel, Santa Maria dei Servi, Bologna
- Jesus among the Doctors and Coronation of the Virgin – Part of the Mysteries of the Rosary in the Rosary chapel in the Basilica of San Domenico, Bologna
- Portrait of a Gentleman, His Daughter and a Servant – Musée de la Chartreuse de Douai

== Gallery ==
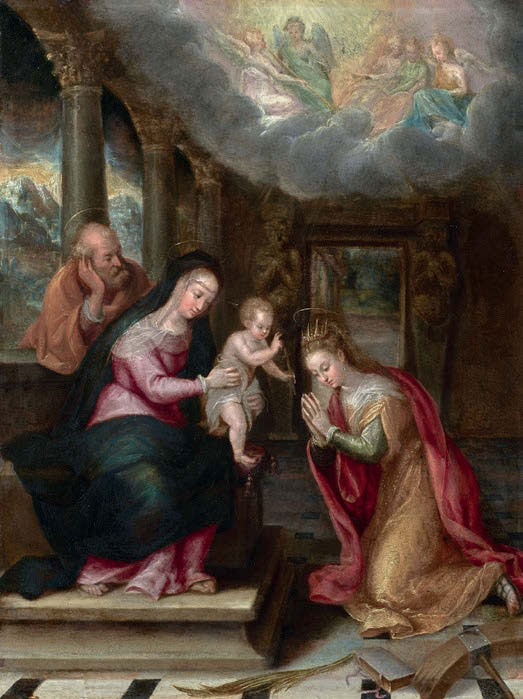
Mystic marriage of Saint Catherine, 1574–1577, National Gallery of Victoria, Melbourne

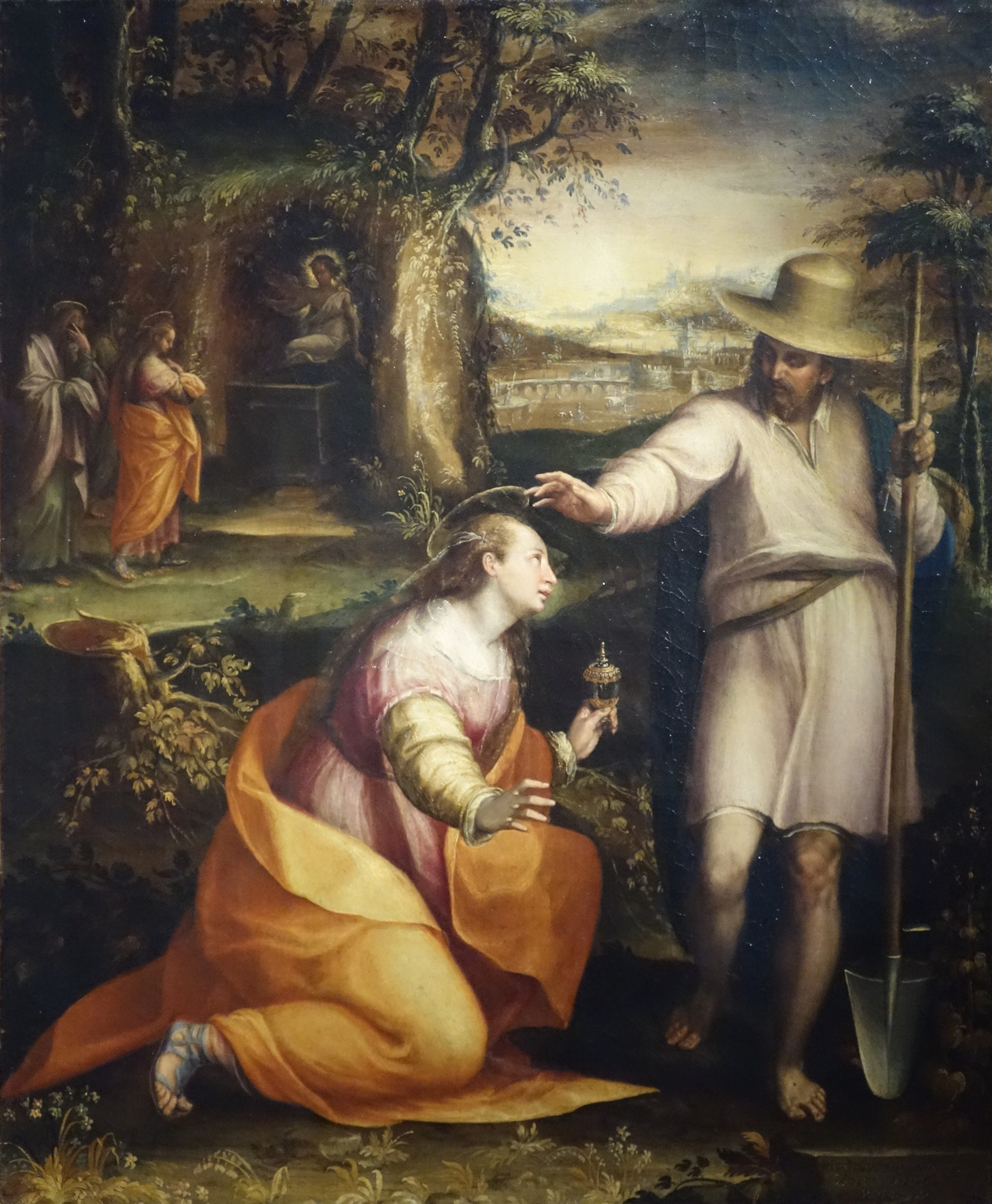
Christ appears to Mary Magdalen. Noli me tangere, 1581, Uffizi, Florence

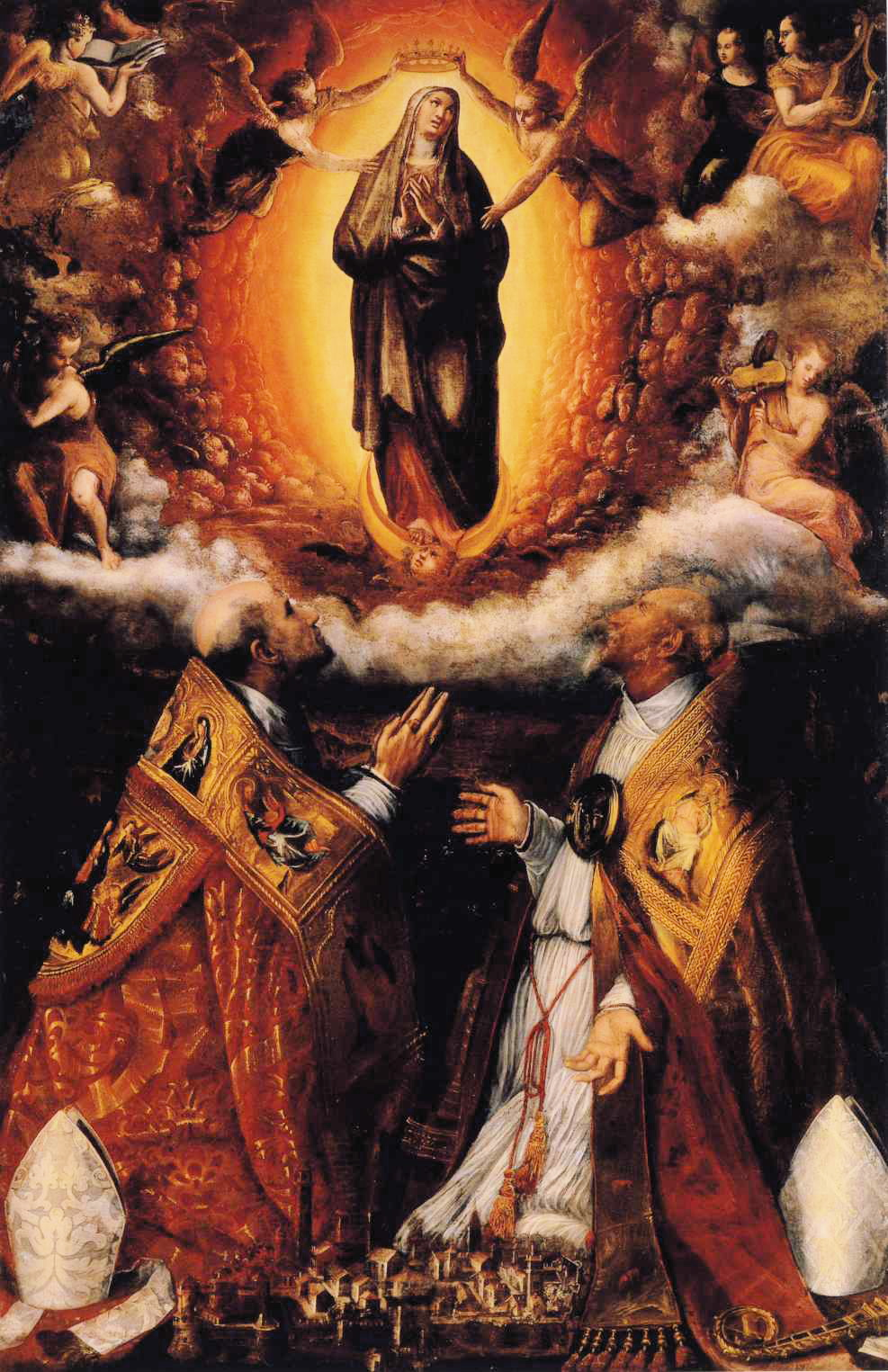
Assumption of the Virgin with Saints Peter Chrysologus and Cassian, 1584, Palazzo Comunale, Imola

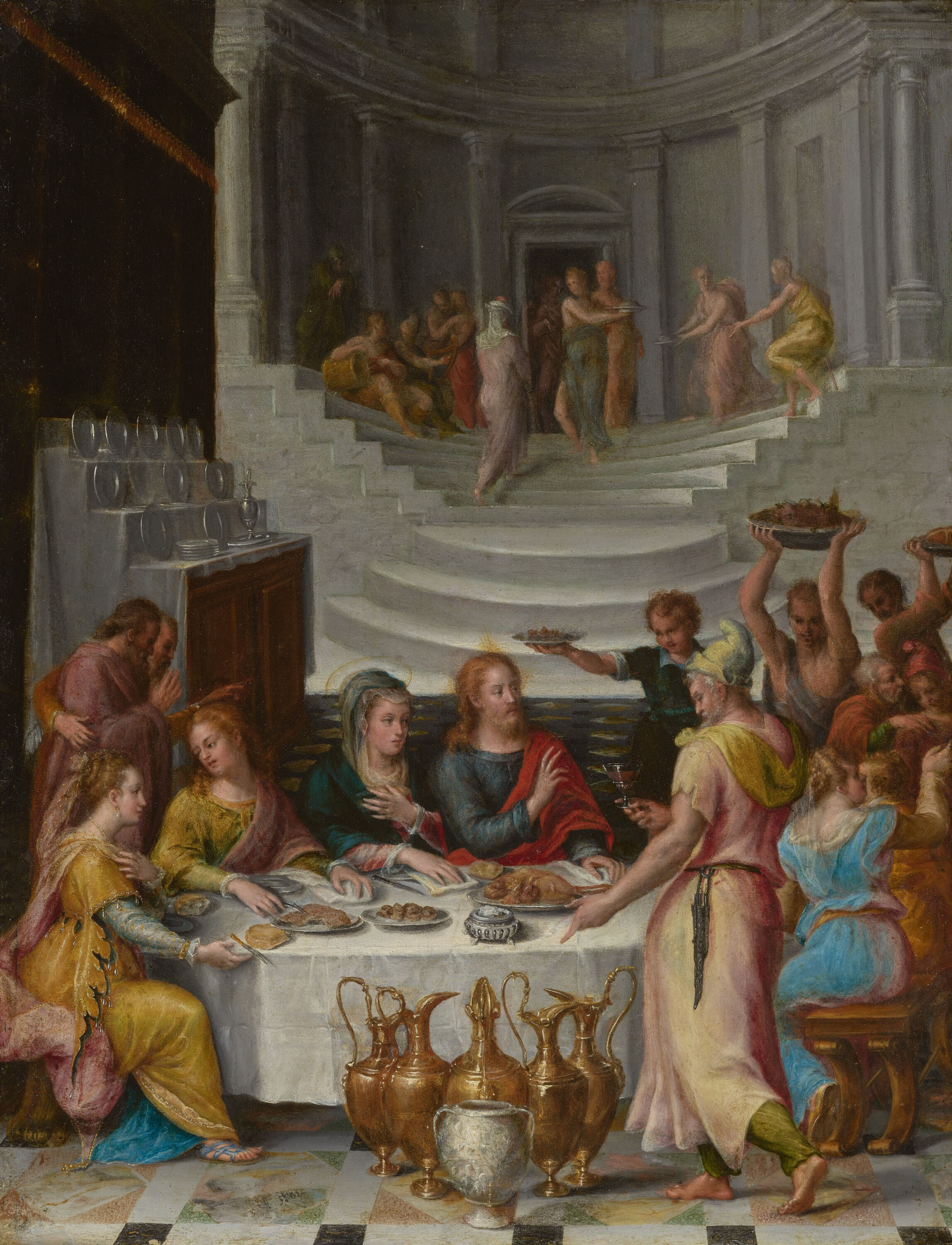
Wedding Feast at Cana, c. 1575–1580, J. Paul Getty Museum, Los Angeles

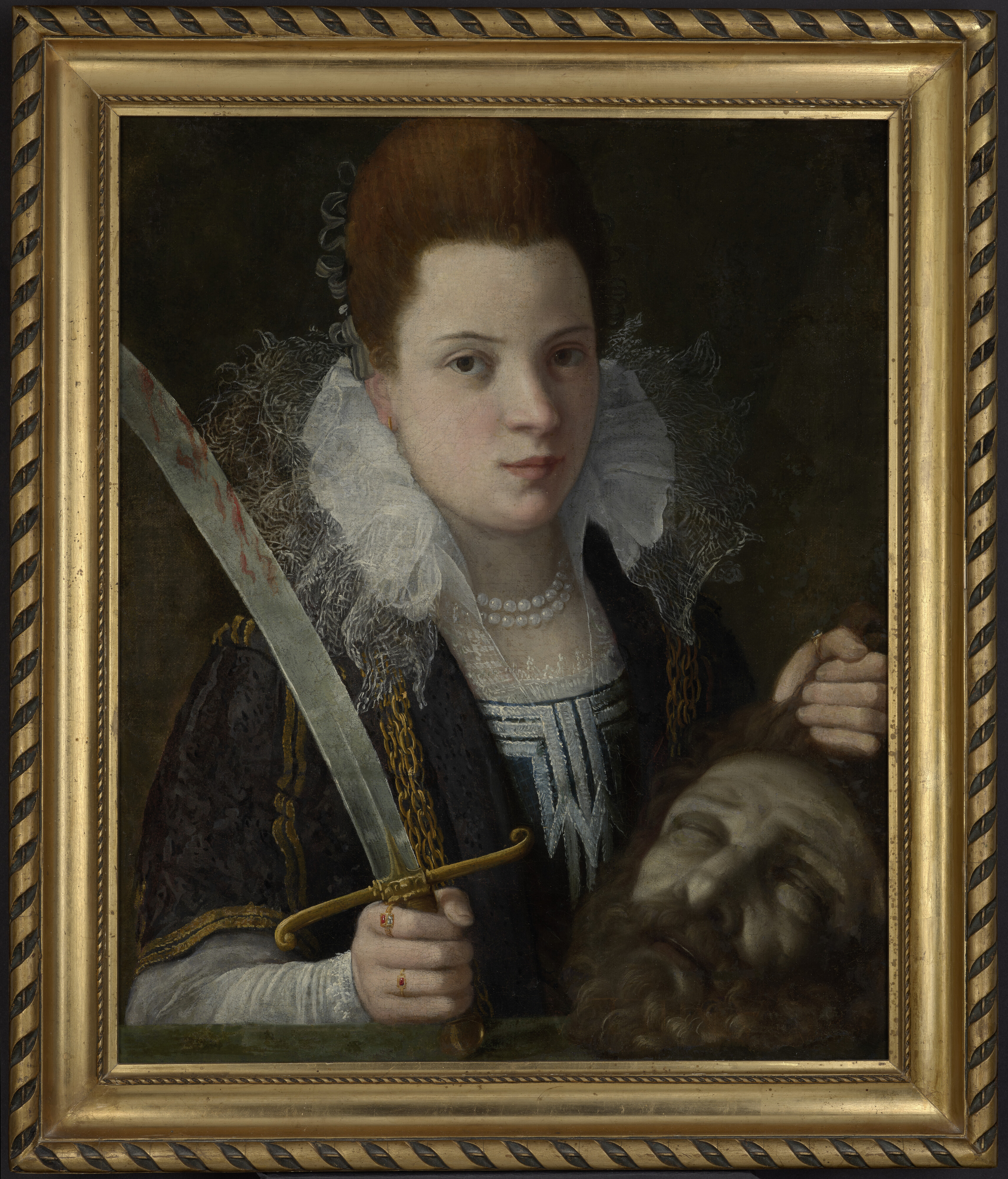
Judith with the head of Holofernes, 1590–1595, National Museum in Kraków

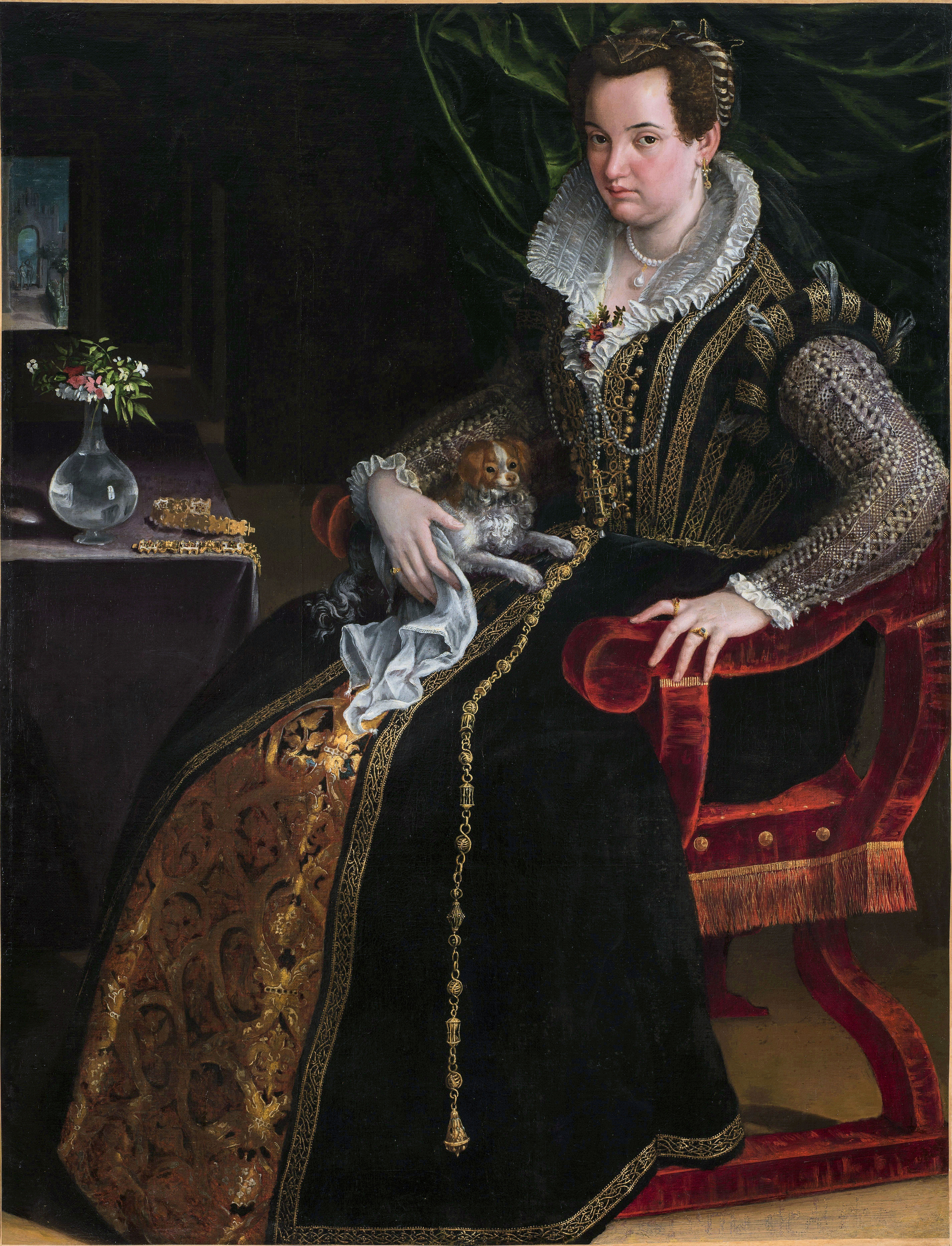
Portrait of Costanza Alidosi, c. 1595, National Museum of Women in the Arts, Washington, D.C.

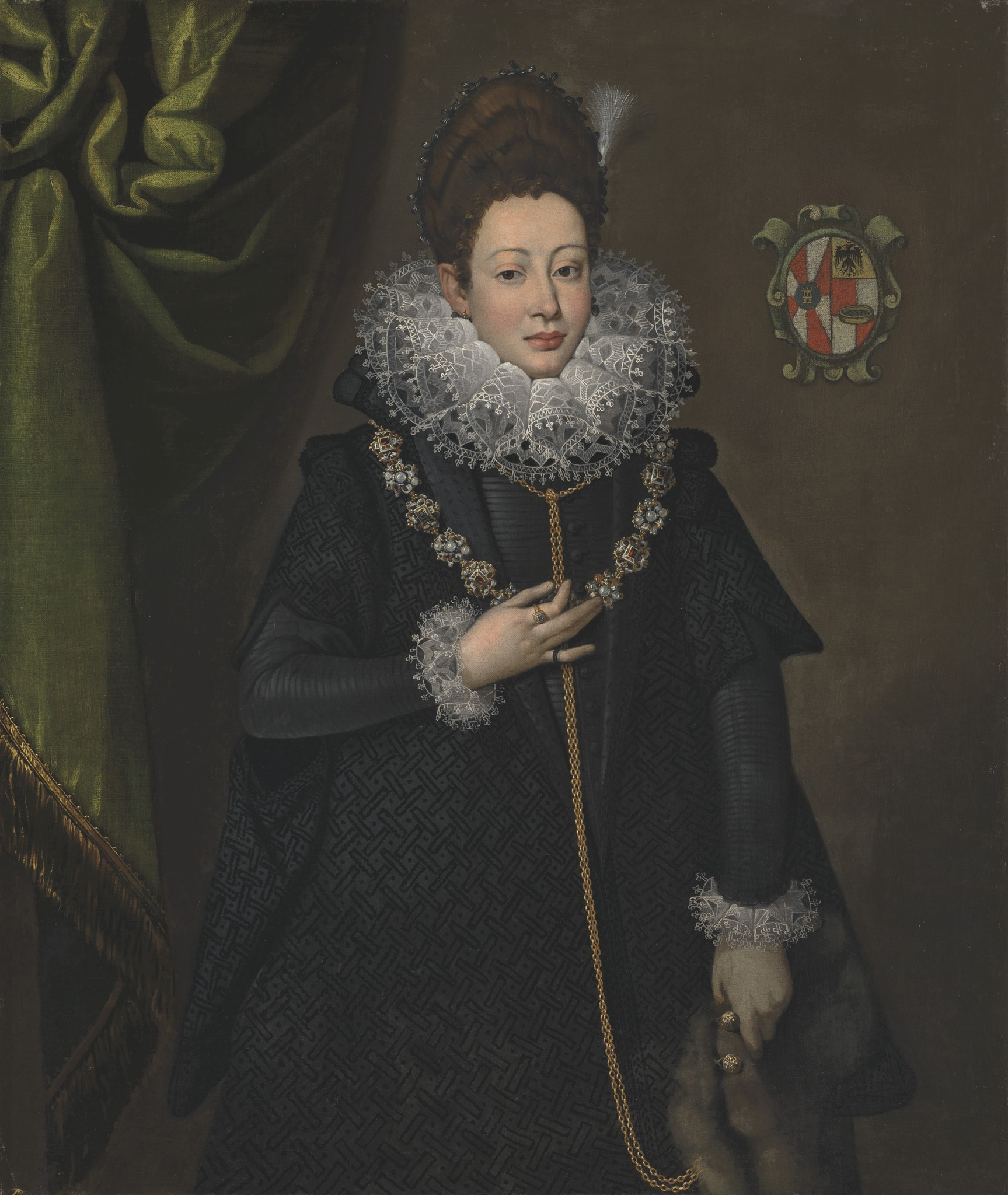
Portrait of Bianca Lucia Aliprandi, 1602, private collection

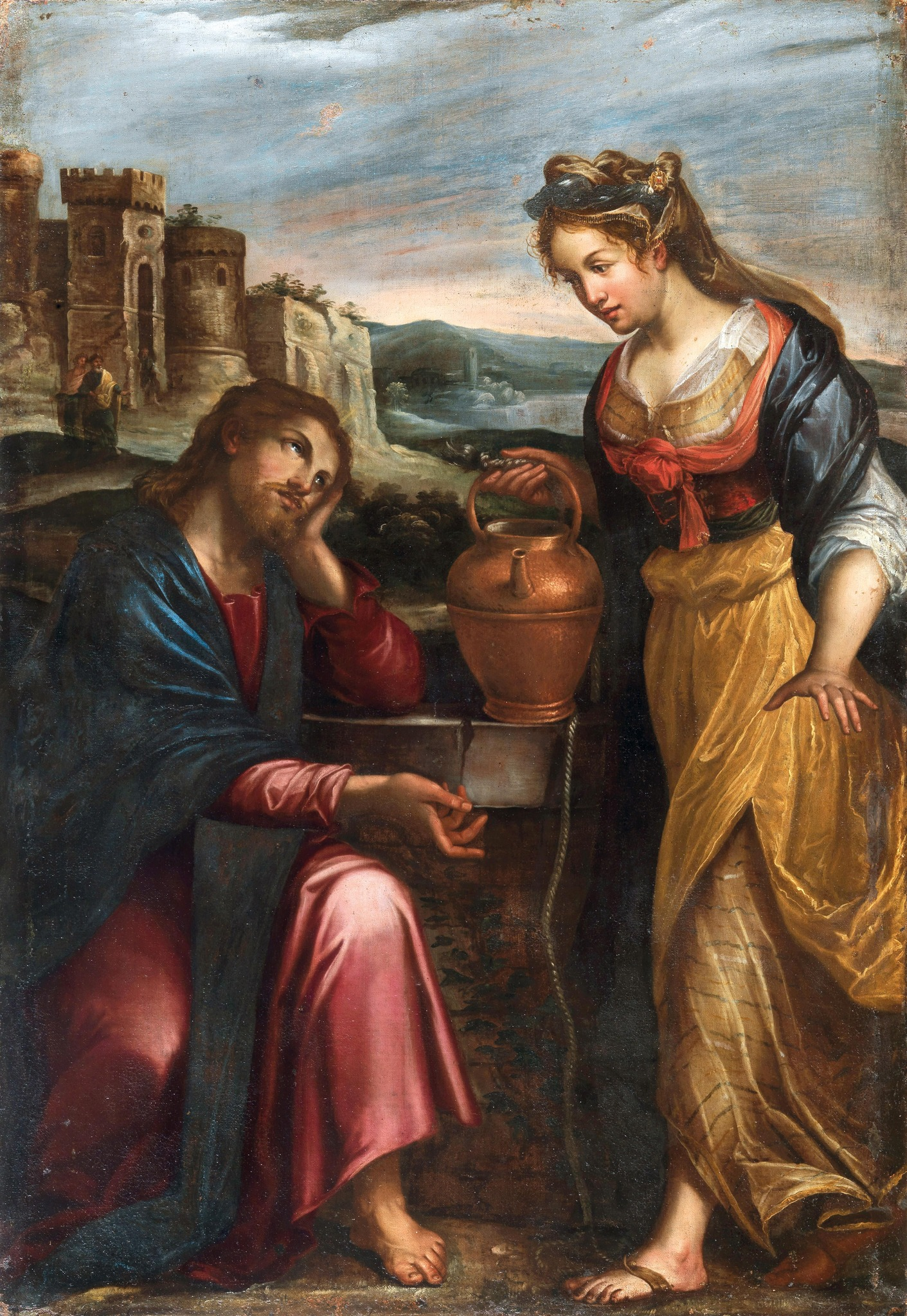
Christ and the Samaritan woman at the well, unknown date, private collection

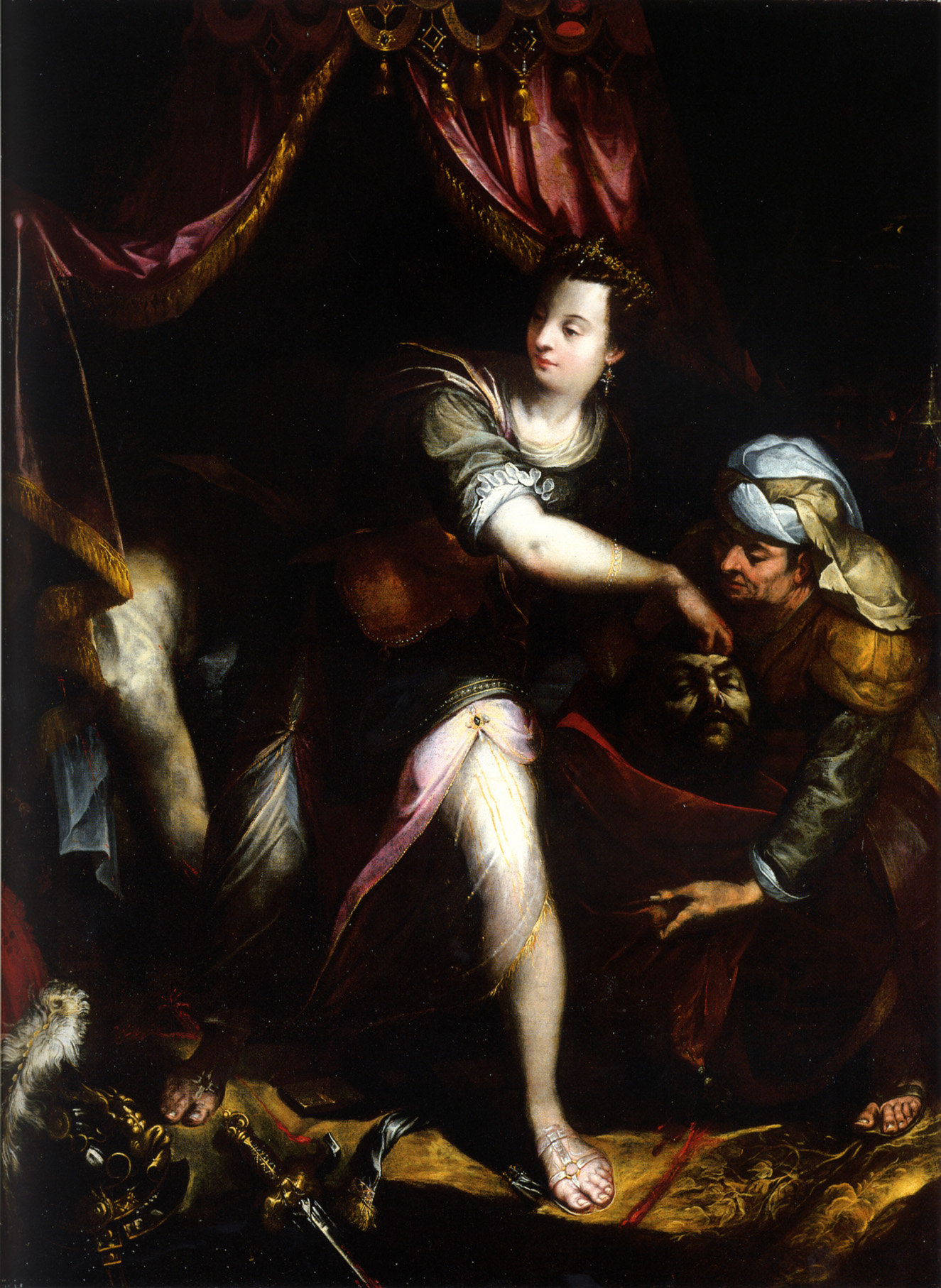
Judith and Holofernes, unknown date, private collection

== See also ==
- Women Artists
- Invisible Women: Forgotten Artists of Florence
- Sofonisba Anguissola
- List of Italian women artists
- Italian Renaissance painting

== Sources ==
- Chadwick, Whitney (1990). Women, Art, and Society. London: Thames and Hudson. ISBN 9780500202418.
- Cheney, Liana (Spring–Summer 1984). "Lavinia Fontana, Boston 'Holy Family'". Woman's Art Journal. 5 (1).
- Cheney, Liana De Girolami; Faxon, Alicia Craig; Russo, Kathleen Lucey (2000). Self-Portraits by Women Painters. Singapore: Ashgate. ISBN 978-1-85928-424-7.
- Findlen, Paula (2002). The Italian Renaissance. Wiley. ISBN 978-0-631-22283-5.
- Fortunati, Vera (1998). Lavinia Fontana of Bologna (1552–1614). Milan: Electa. ISBN 978-8843563944.
- Gaze, Delia. Concise Dictionary of Women Artists.
- Hansen, Morten Steen; Spicer, Joaneath, eds. (2005). Masterpieces of Italian Painting, The Walters Art Museum. Baltimore and London. ISBN 978-1904832140.
- Harris, Anne Sutherland; Nochlin, Linda (1976). Women Artists: 1550–1950. New York: Los Angeles County Museum of Art.
- Murphy, Caroline P. (1996). "Lavinia Fontana and 'Le Dame della Citta': understanding female artistic patronage in late sixteenth-century Bologna." Renaissance Studies. 10 (2). pp. 190–208.
- Murphy, Caroline P. (1997). "Lavinia Fontana". Dictionary of Women Artists. Vol 1. Delia Gaze, ed. Chicago: Fitzroy Dearborn. pp. 534–537. ISBN 1-884964-21-4.
- Murphy, Caroline P. (2003). Lavinia Fontana: A Painter and Her Patrons in Sixteenth-century Bologna. Yale University Press. ISBN 978-0-300-09913-3.
- Rocco, Patricia. The Devout Hand: Women, Virtue, and Visual Culture in Early Modern Italy. McGill-Queens University Press, 2017.
- Smyth, Francis P.; O'Neill, John P. (1986). The Age of Correggio and the Carracci: Emilian Painting of the 16th and 17th Centuries. Washington DC: National Gallery of Art. pp. 132–136.
