= Vincenzo Gotti =

Italian painter

Vicenzo Gotti
- Born: c. 1580; Bologna
- Died: 1636; Reggio di Calabria
- Known for: Painting
- Movement: Baroque

Vicenzo Gotti (c. 1580 – 1636) was an Italian painter of the Baroque period.

He was born in Bologna, where he initially had been, alongside Guido Reni, a pupil of Dionysius Calvaert. At the age of 20 years, he moved to Rome with Reni. After some time, he moved to Naples, where he became a prolific painter. He died at Reggio Calabria.
