= Giovanni Giacomo Semenza =

Italian painter

- Born: July 18, 1580; Bologna
- Died: 1638 (aged 57–58)
- Known for: Painting
- Movement: Baroque

Giovanni Giacomo Semenza (18 July 1580 – 1638) was an Italian painter of the early Baroque period. Born in Bologna and also known as Giacomo Sementi. He was a pupil of the painter Denis Calvaert, then of Guido Reni. Among his pupils were Giacinto Brandi. He painted a Christ the Redeemer for the church of St. Catherine in Bologna.
