= Denis Calvaert =

Flemish painter (1540–1619)

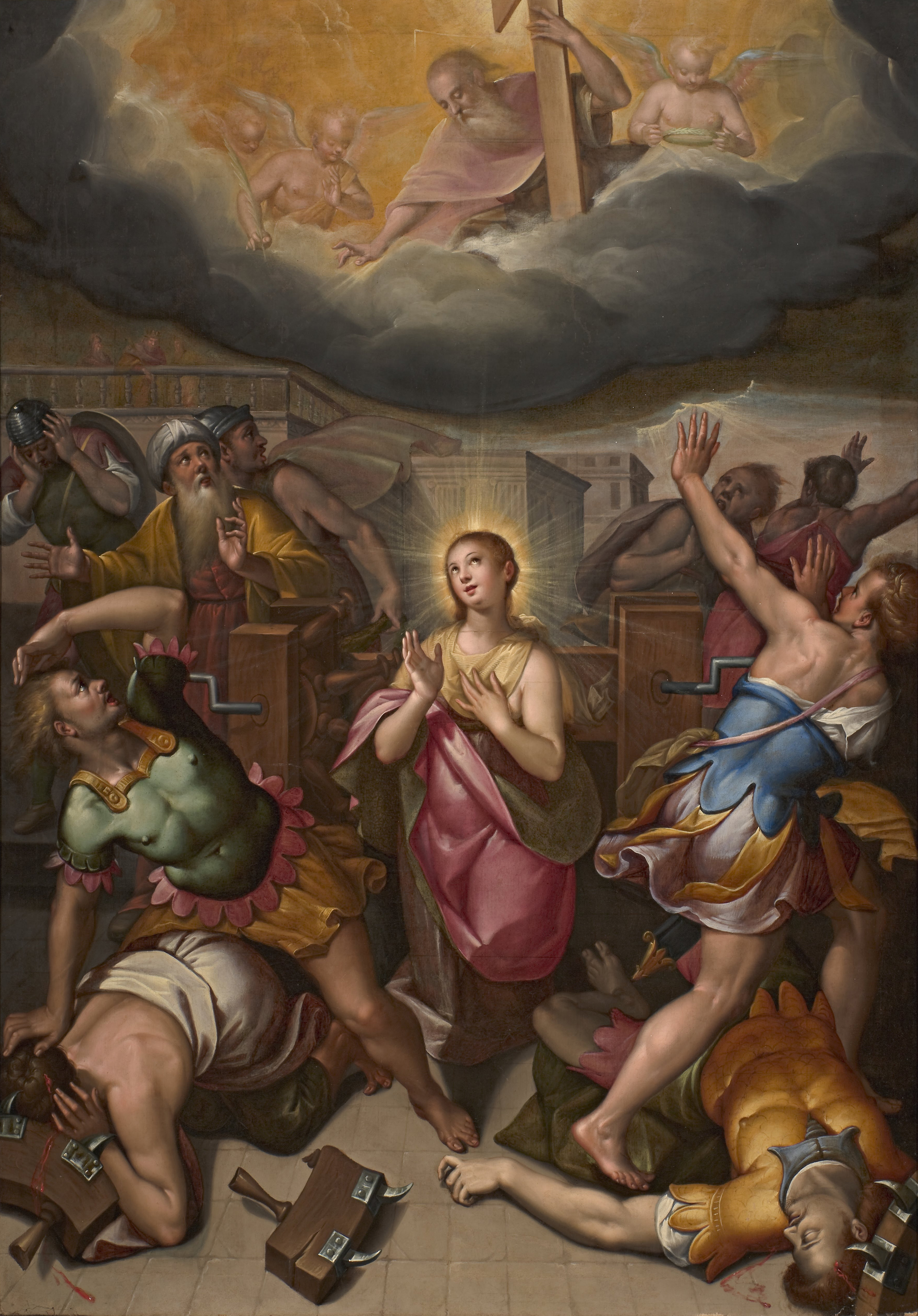
- The miracle of Saint Catherine
- Born: Denys Calvaert c. 1540; Antwerp, Duchy of Brabant
- Died: 16 April 1619 (aged 78–79); Bologna, Papal States
- Other names: Dionisio Fiammingo, Il Fiammingo, Dionysius, Denys, Denijs
- Known for: Painting
- Movement: Baroque

Denis (Note: Also found as Denys or Denijs.) Calvaert (Dutch: [ˈdɛnɪs ˈkɑlvaːrt]; around 1540 – 16 April 1619) was an Antwerp-born Flemish painter who spent most of his life in Italy, where he was known as Dionisio Fiammingo (Italian: [di.oˈniːzjo fjamˈmiŋɡo, djoˈ-]) or simply Il Fiammingo ("the Fleming"). Calvaert was a profound student of architecture, anatomy, and history. His works are characterized by their advanced composition and colouring.

Calvaert is well known for his drawings and small copper paintings.

Some of his best known works include his rendition of The Resurrection of Christ and Saint John the Baptist in the Wilderness.

== Biography ==
After studying landscape-painting for some time in his native city (the Antwerp "Record of Artists" or "Liggeren" (1556–57), gives his name as Caluwaert), he first studied under Christiaen van Queecborn. He then went to Bologna, where he apprenticed under Prospero Fontana. His paintings acquired the mannerism of Flemish art and appeared to be the work of an Italian. In 1572, he moved to Rome, where he assisted Lorenzo Sabbatini in his works for the papal palace of the Vatican, and devoted much of his time to copying and studying the works of Raphael Sanzio.

He returned to Bologna and founded a studio. He took as a pupil the daughter of his mentor, Lavinia Fontana, and a number of prominent young apprentices, including Guido Reni, Giovanni Battista Bertusio, Francesco Albani and Domenichino, who soon followed Annibale Carracci's example and took prominent commissions in Rome. Vicenzio Gotti, Francesco Gessi, and Giacomo Semenza also worked in his studio, before joining the studio of Guido Reni. Vincenzo Spisanelli and Gabriello Ferrantini worked under Calvaert as well.

== Style and legacy ==
Calvaert typically used chiaroscuro techniques to set stylized foreground figures derived from Correggio against northern European landscapes. His use of colour also reflects the influence of Barocci. While continuing to pursue a mannerist aesthetic throughout his career, Calvaert became a significant contributor to the brand of classicism that came to characterize the Bolognese school of painting from the start of the 17th century.

His principal works are to be seen at Bologna, Florence, St. Petersburg, Parma, and Caen. Some of his paintings were lost in WWII, and therefore, only his etchings of those pieces remain. Calvaert's painting of The Holy Family and Saint John the Baptist was one of the few that was returned to the family through Nazi-Era Provenance Research.

Many of his pieces are on display at the National Art Gallery of Bologna, while "St Michael", one of his most renowned works, is displayed at the Basilica of San Petronio.

Other paintings and drawings by Calvaert can be found at the Louvre in Paris (under Dionys Calvaert), The Met Museum in New York (under Denijs Calvaert), The British Museum, The Morgan, Museo Nacional del Prado, and the Museum & Gallery in Greenville, South Carolina.

== Works ==
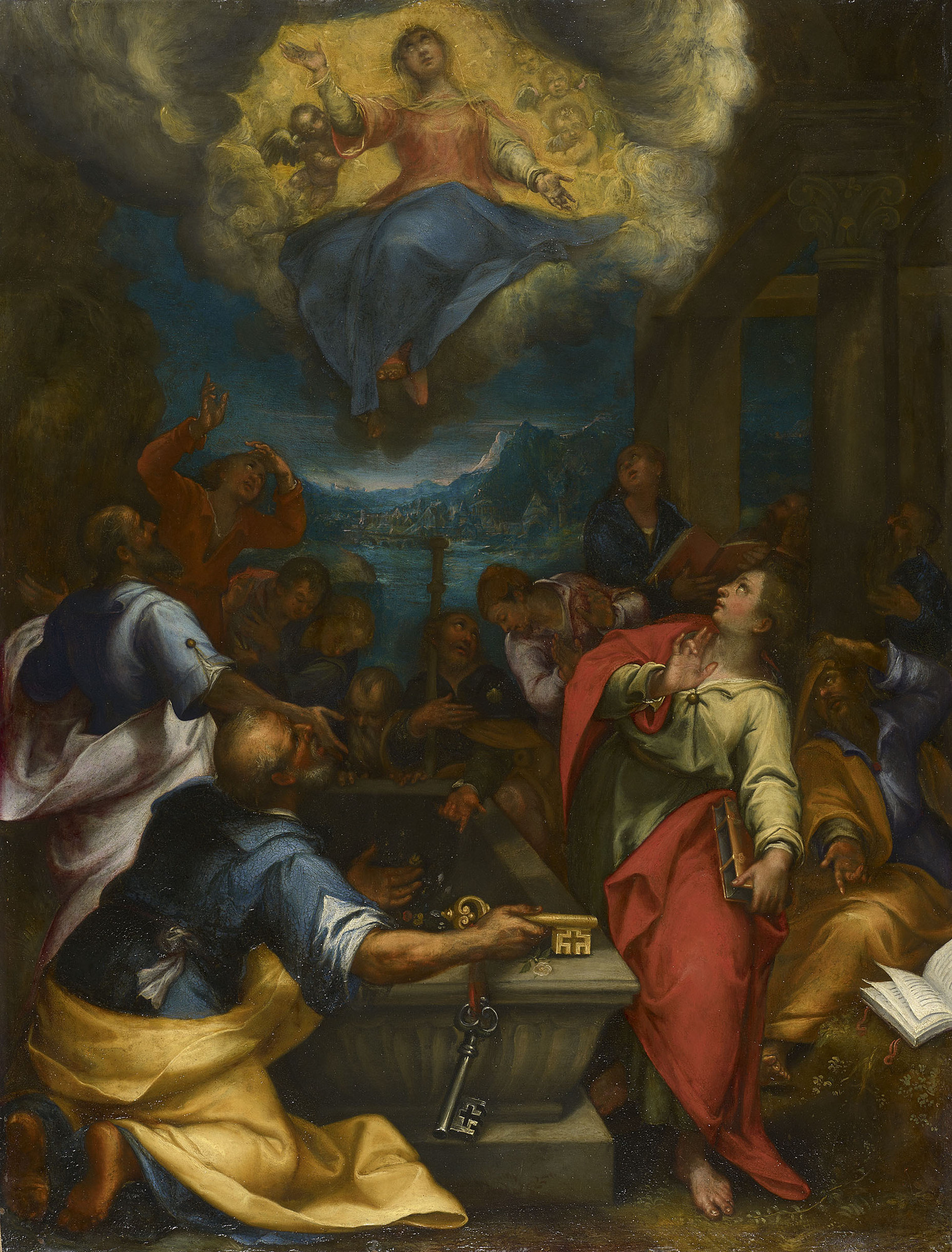
The Assumption of the Virgin, Royal Art Collection

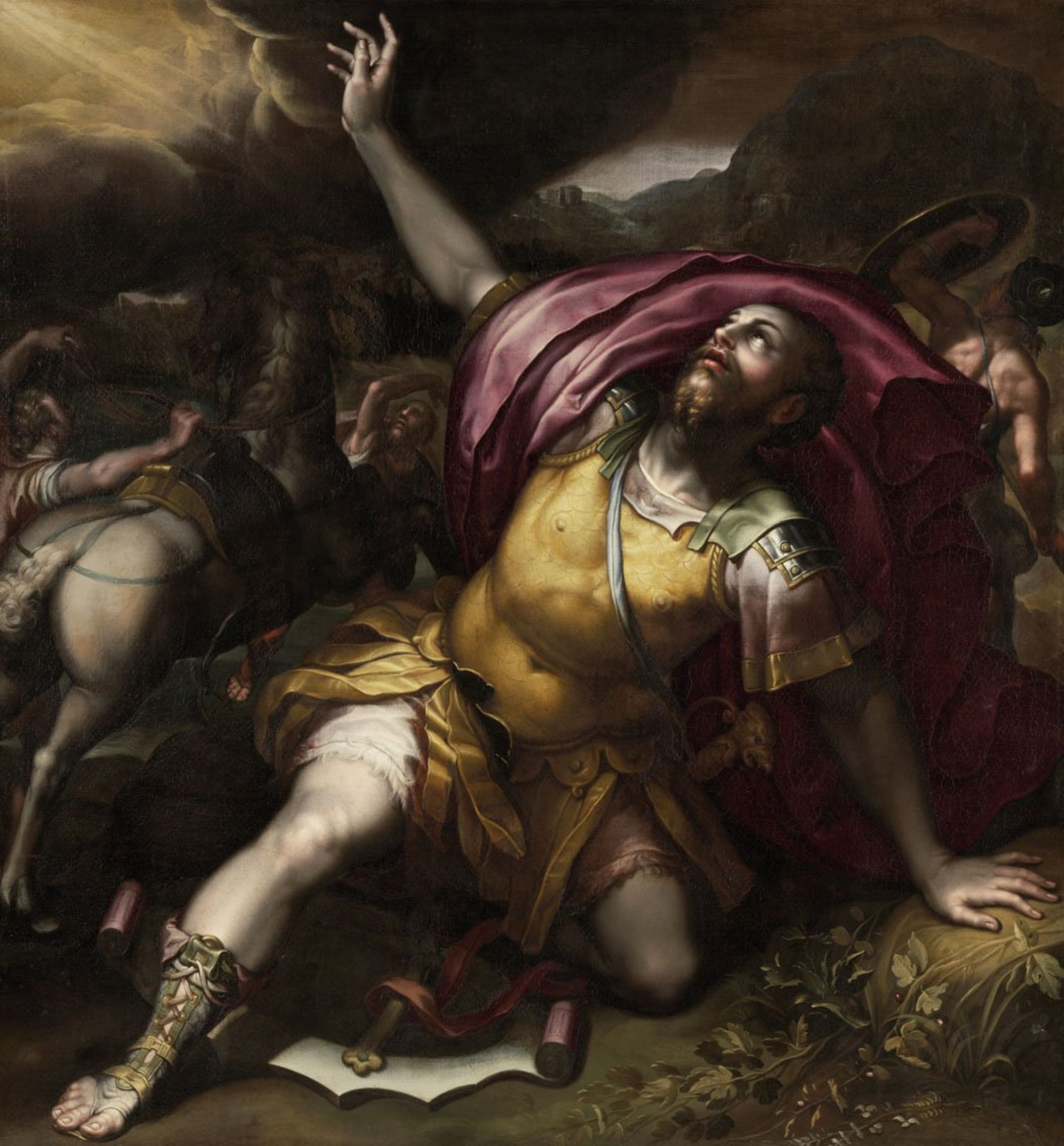
The Conversion of Saint Paul (Museum of Fine Arts, Budapest)

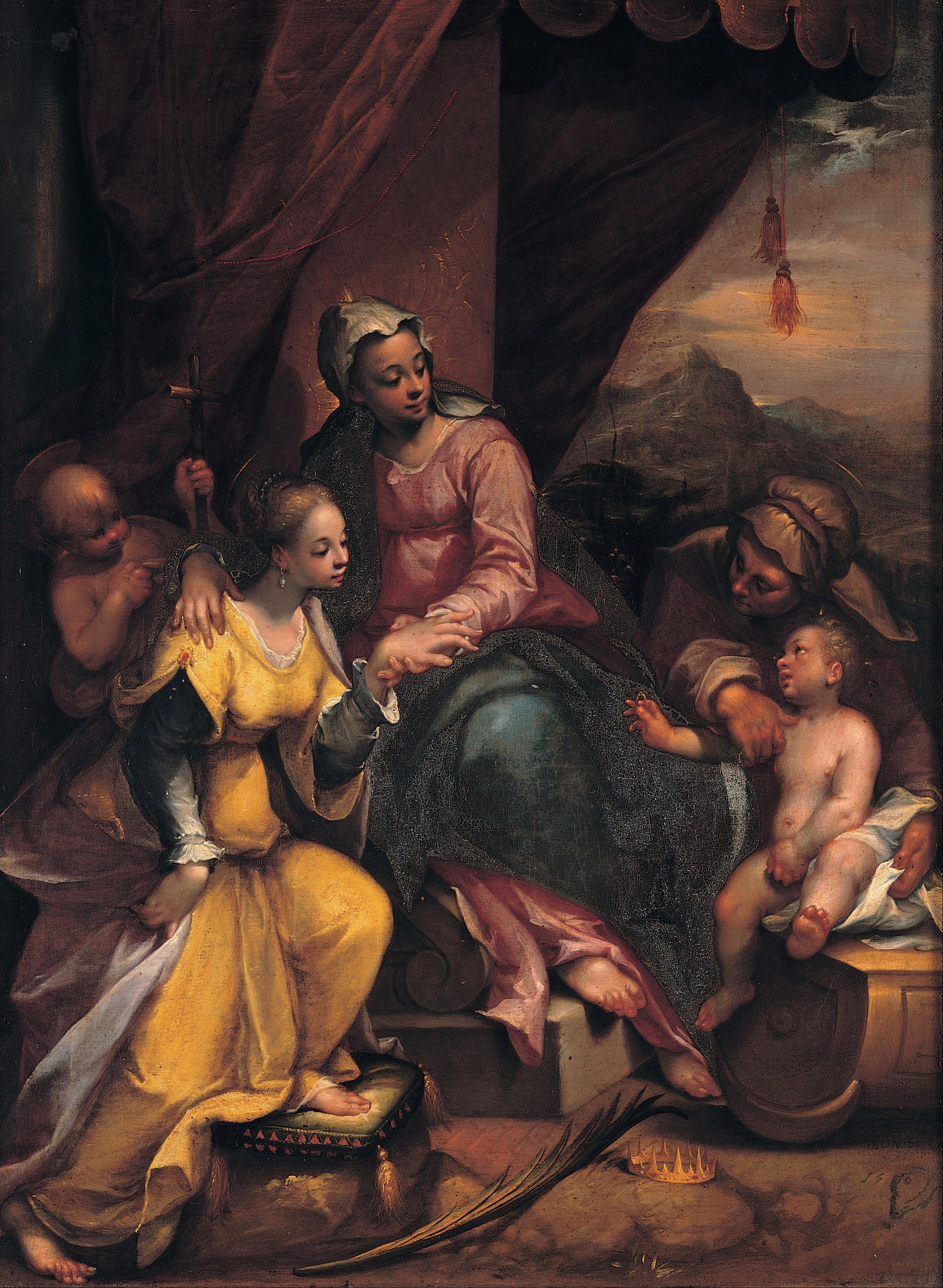
Mystic Marriage of Saint Catherine

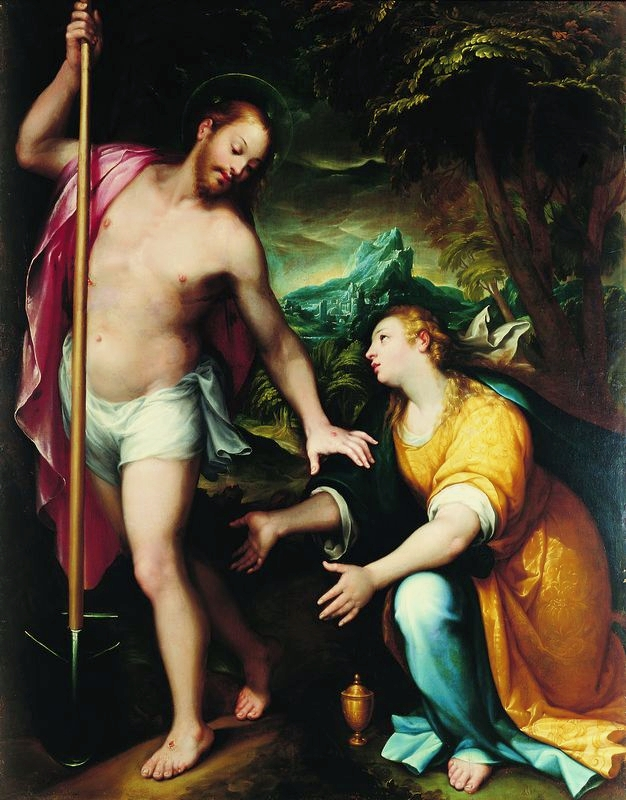
Noli me tangere

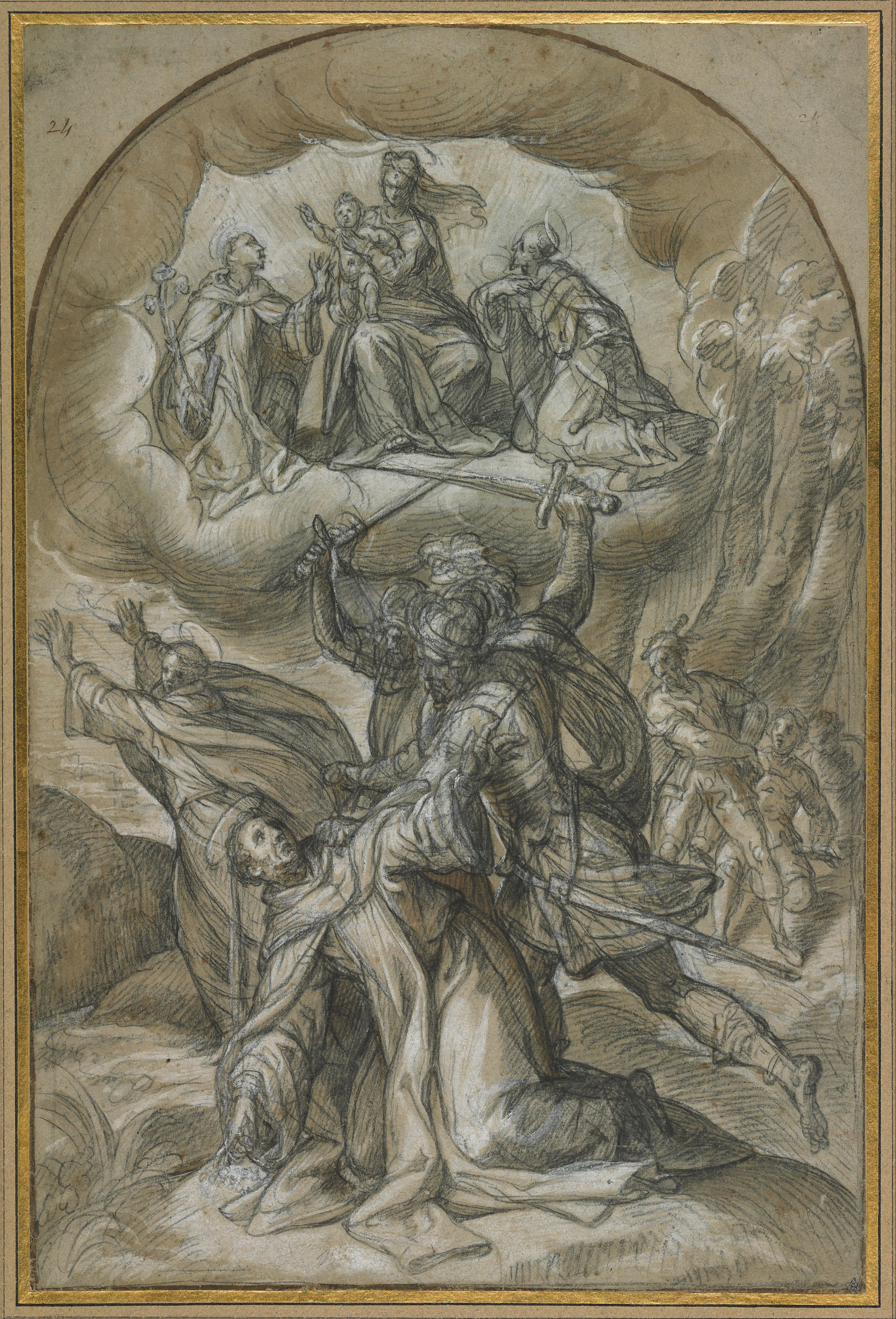
Death of Saint Peter Martyr (Denijs Calvaert)

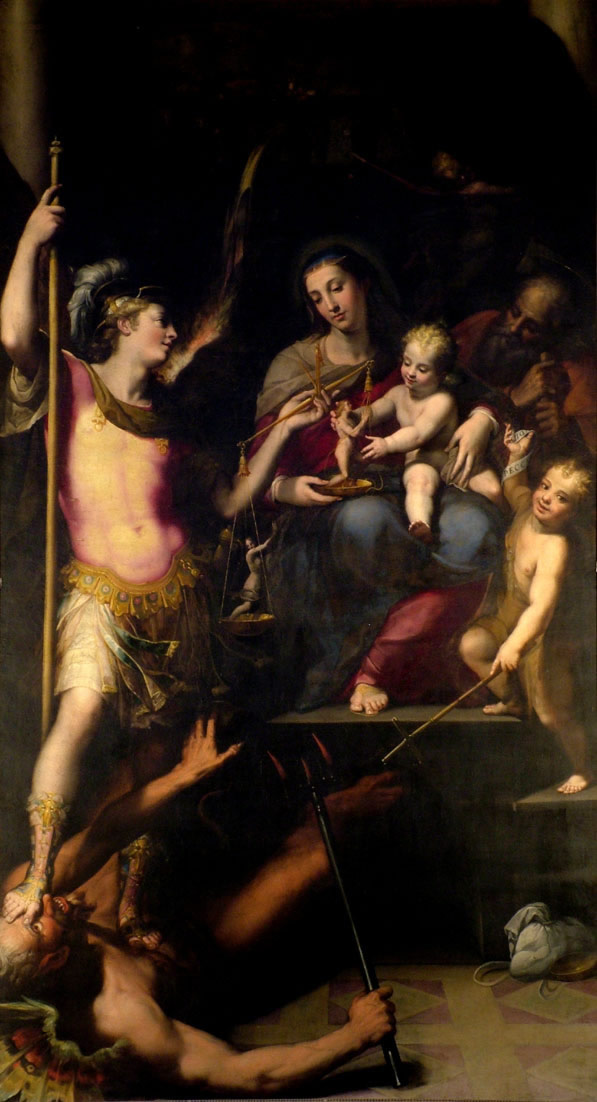
Holy Family with Saint John and Archangel Michael, San Giacomo Maggiore, Bologna

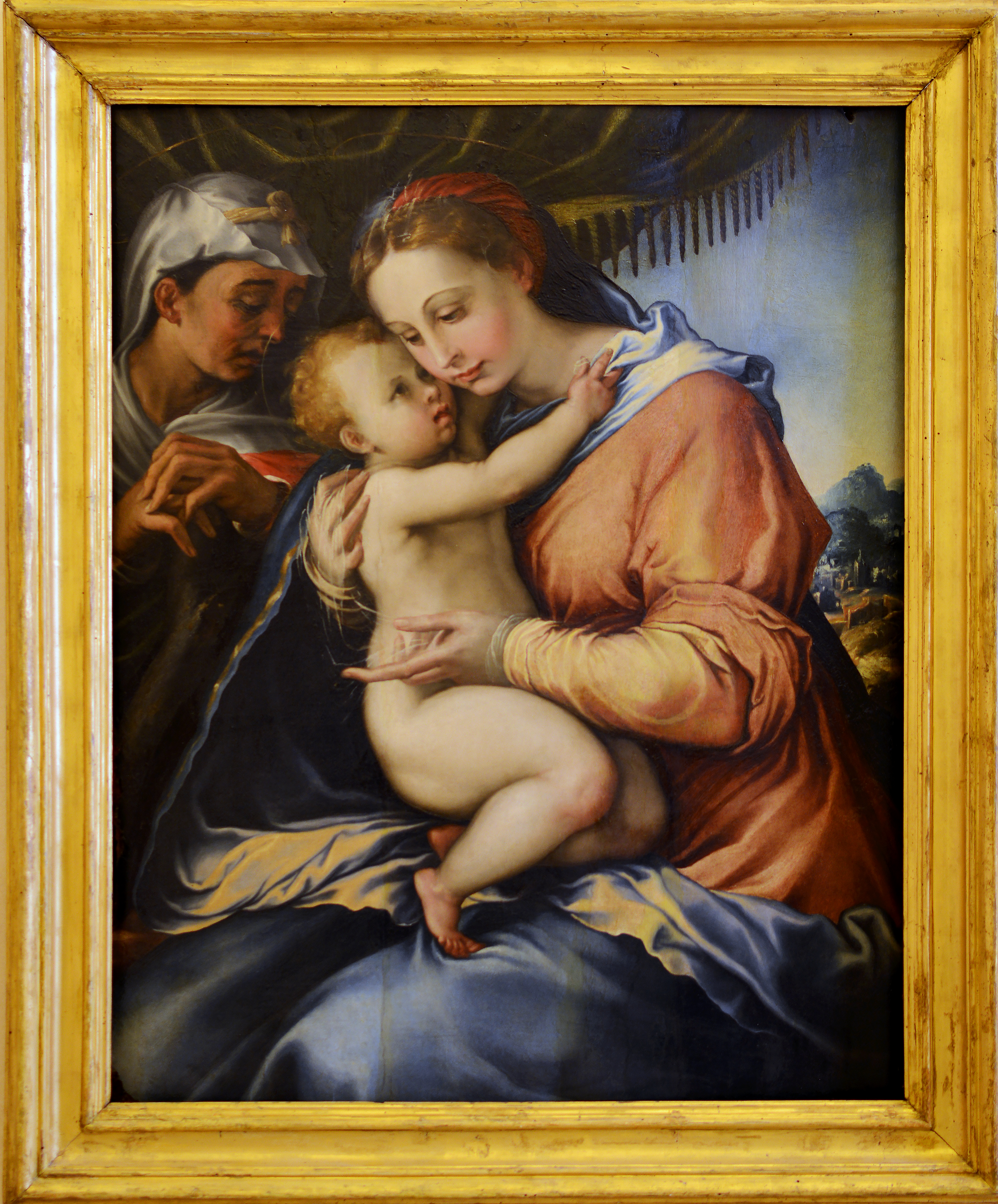
Mystical Marriage of Saint Catherine

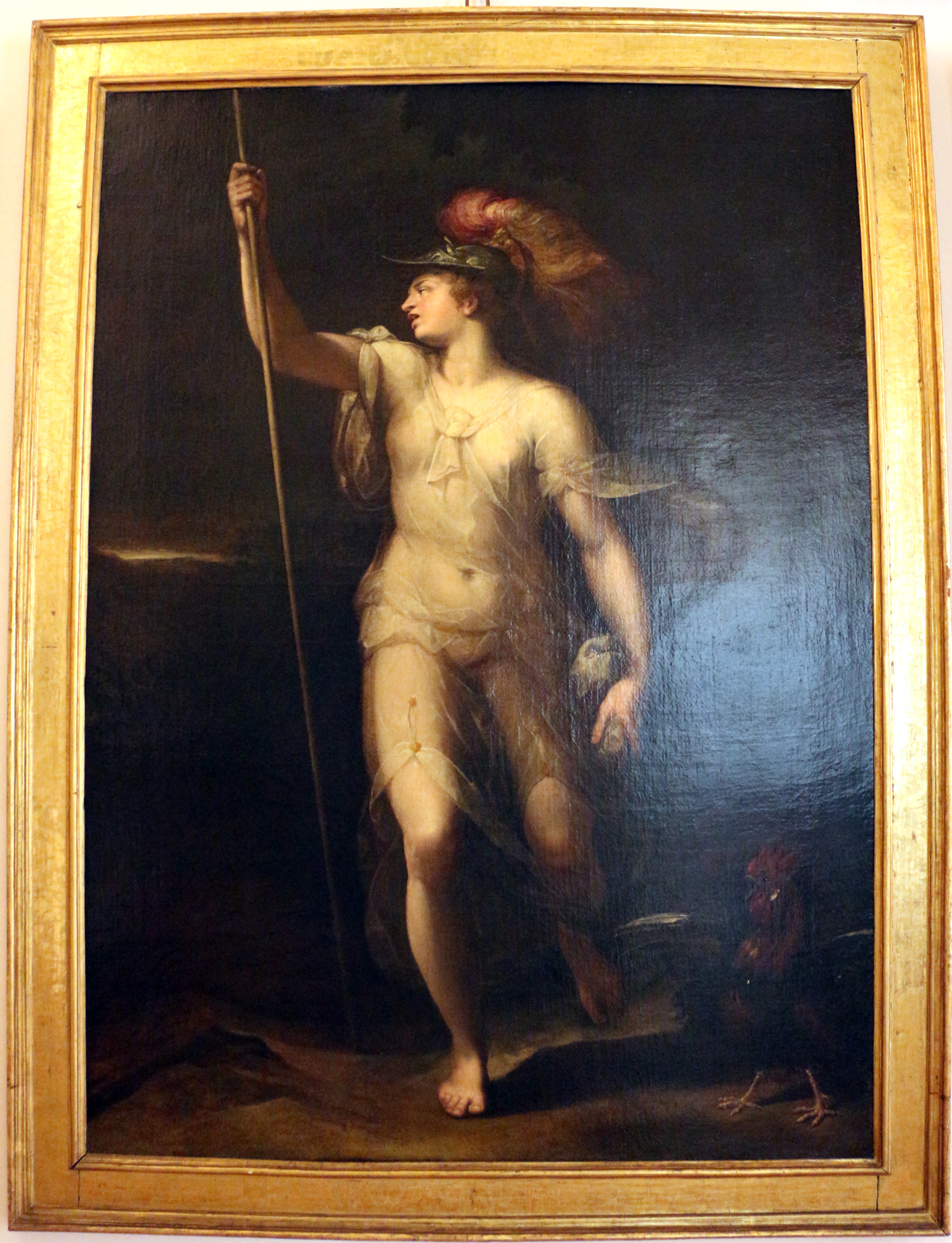
La Vigilanza by Denijs Calvaert

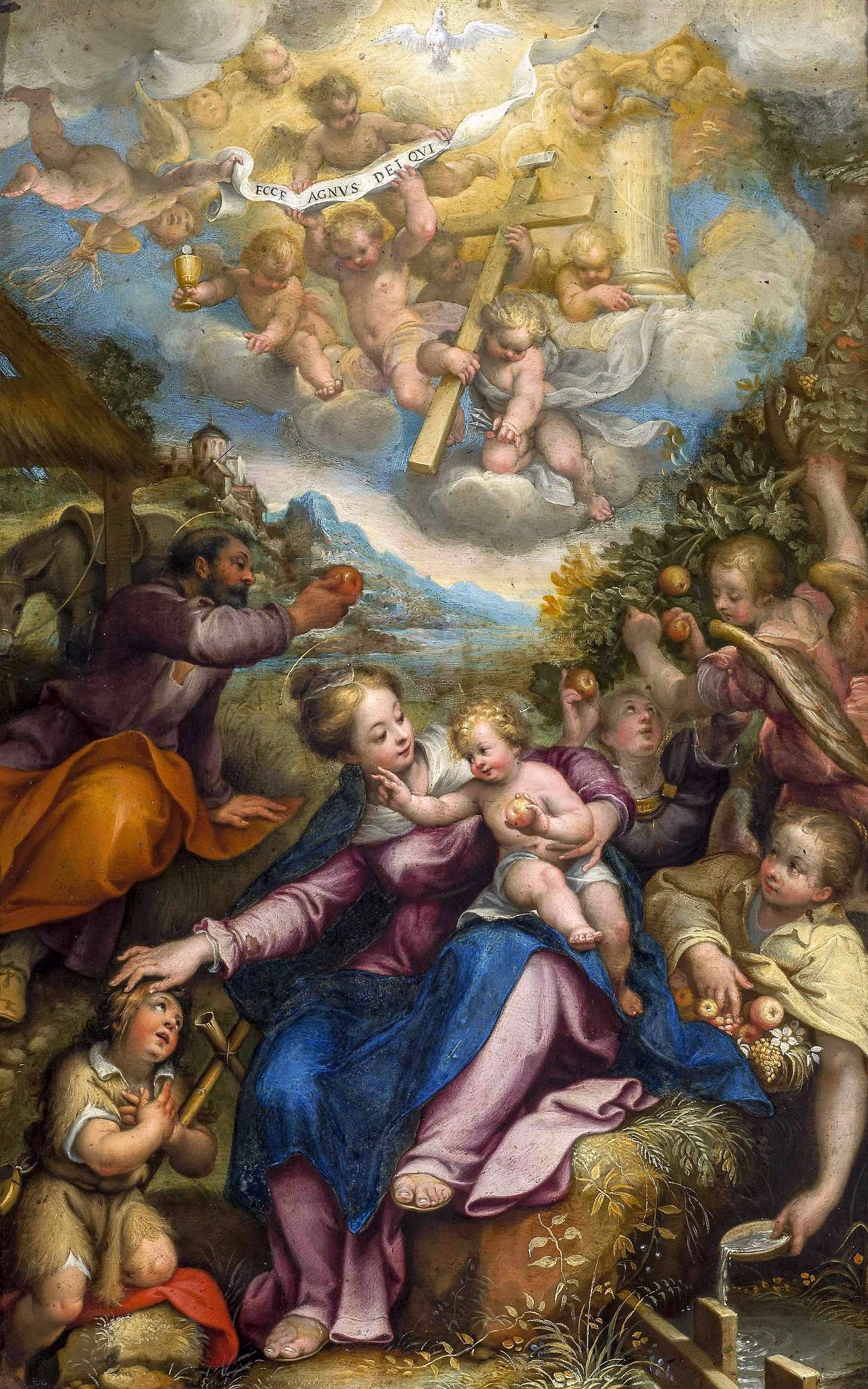
Rest on the Flight into Egypt

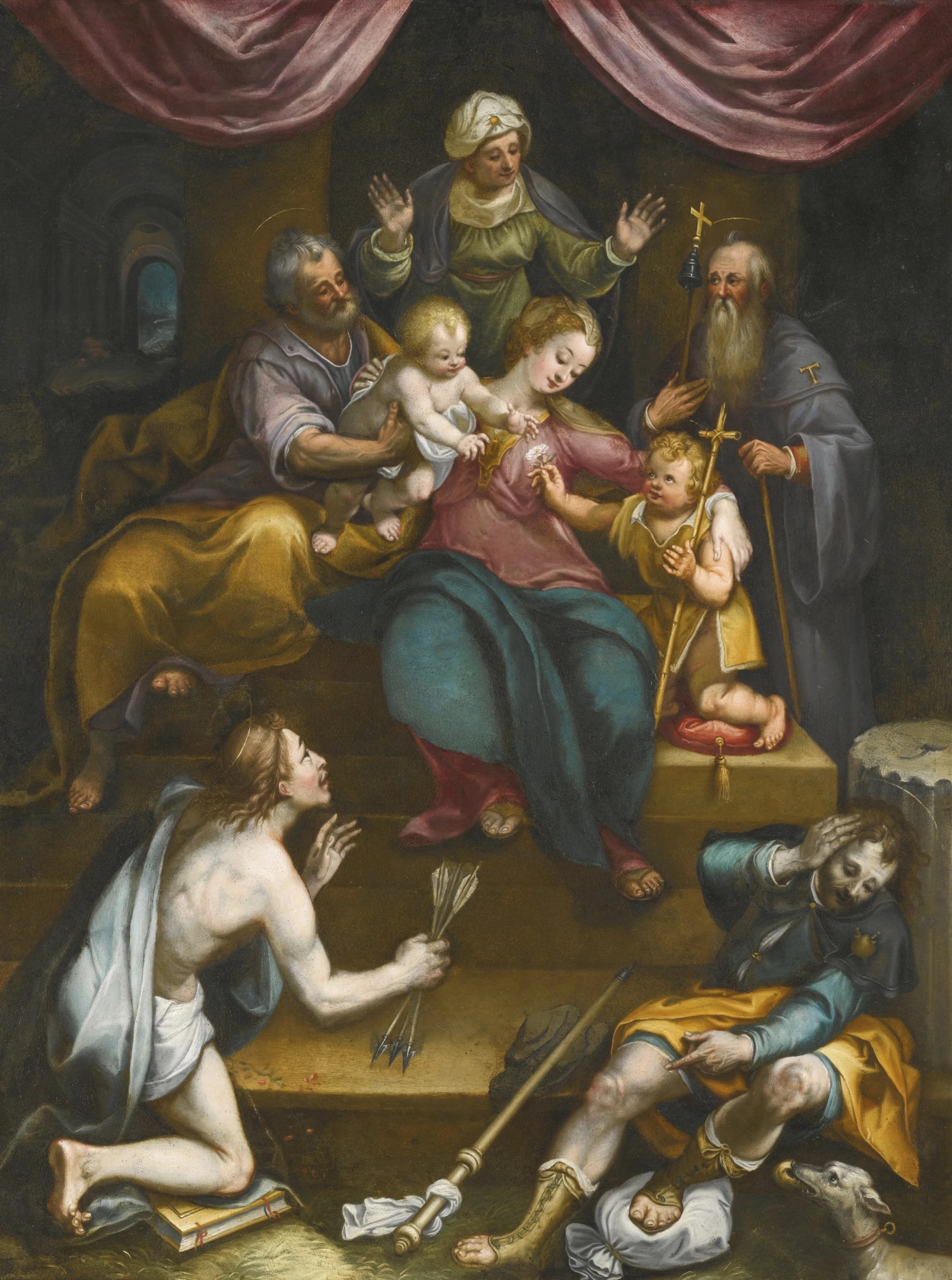
Holy Family with Saint John the Baptist and Saint Anne

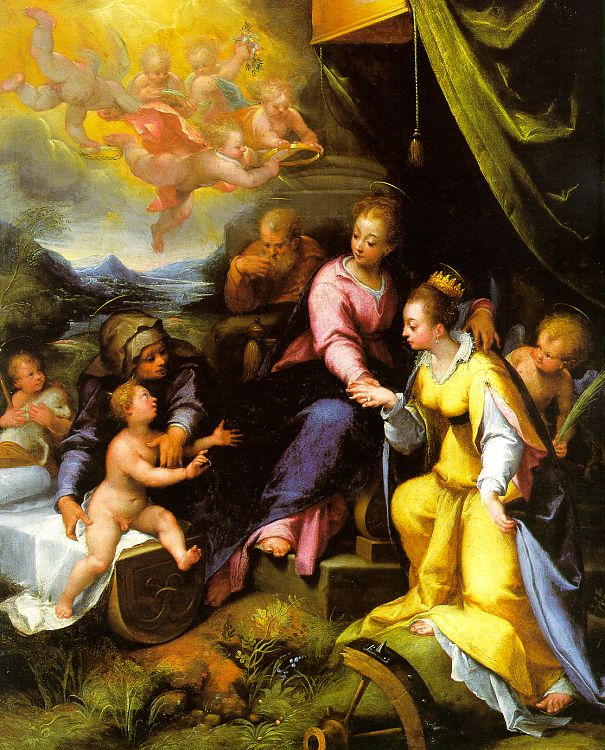
The Holy Family with the Infant Saint John the Baptist (National Galleries of Scotland)

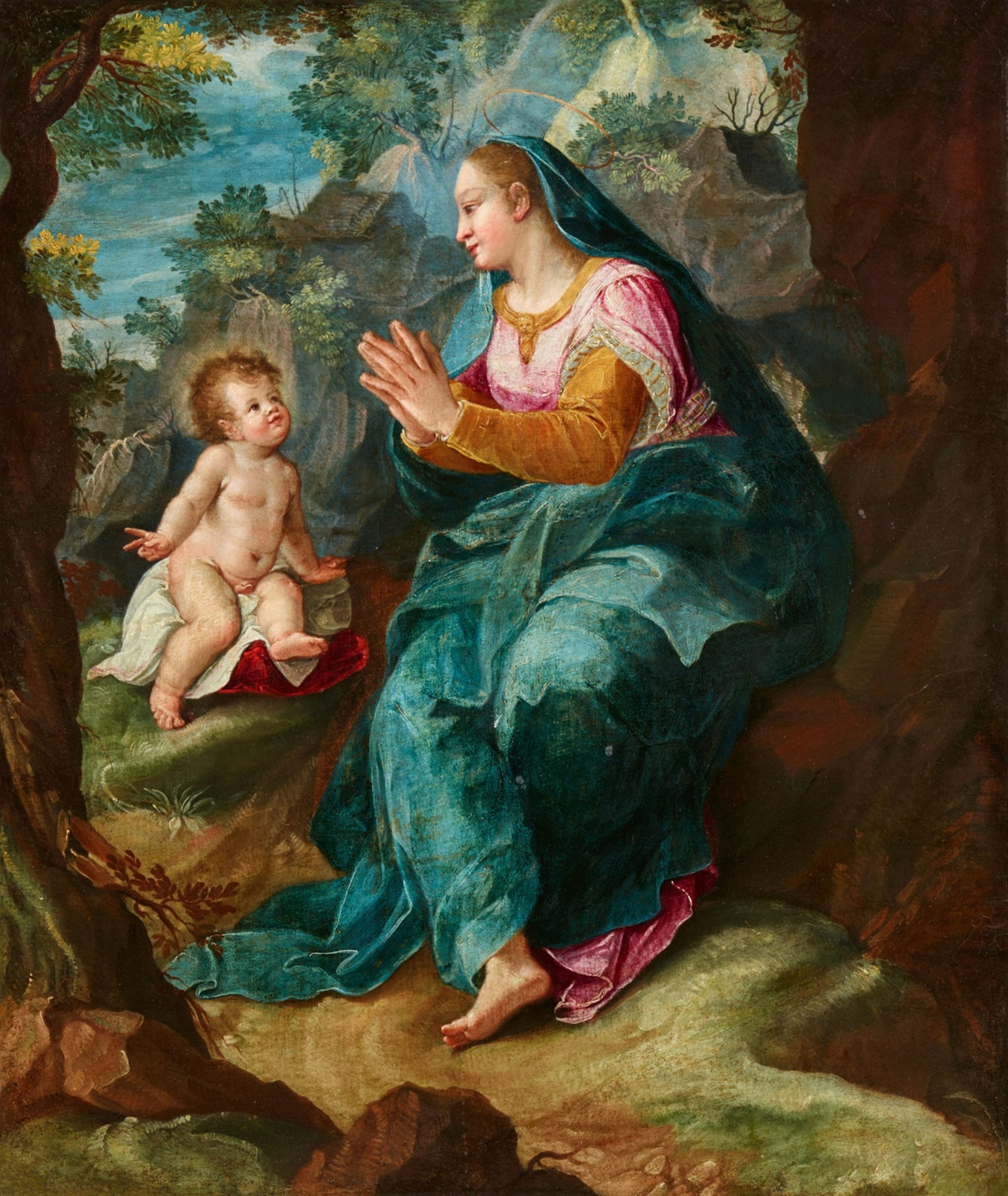
Virgin and Child in a Rocky Landscape

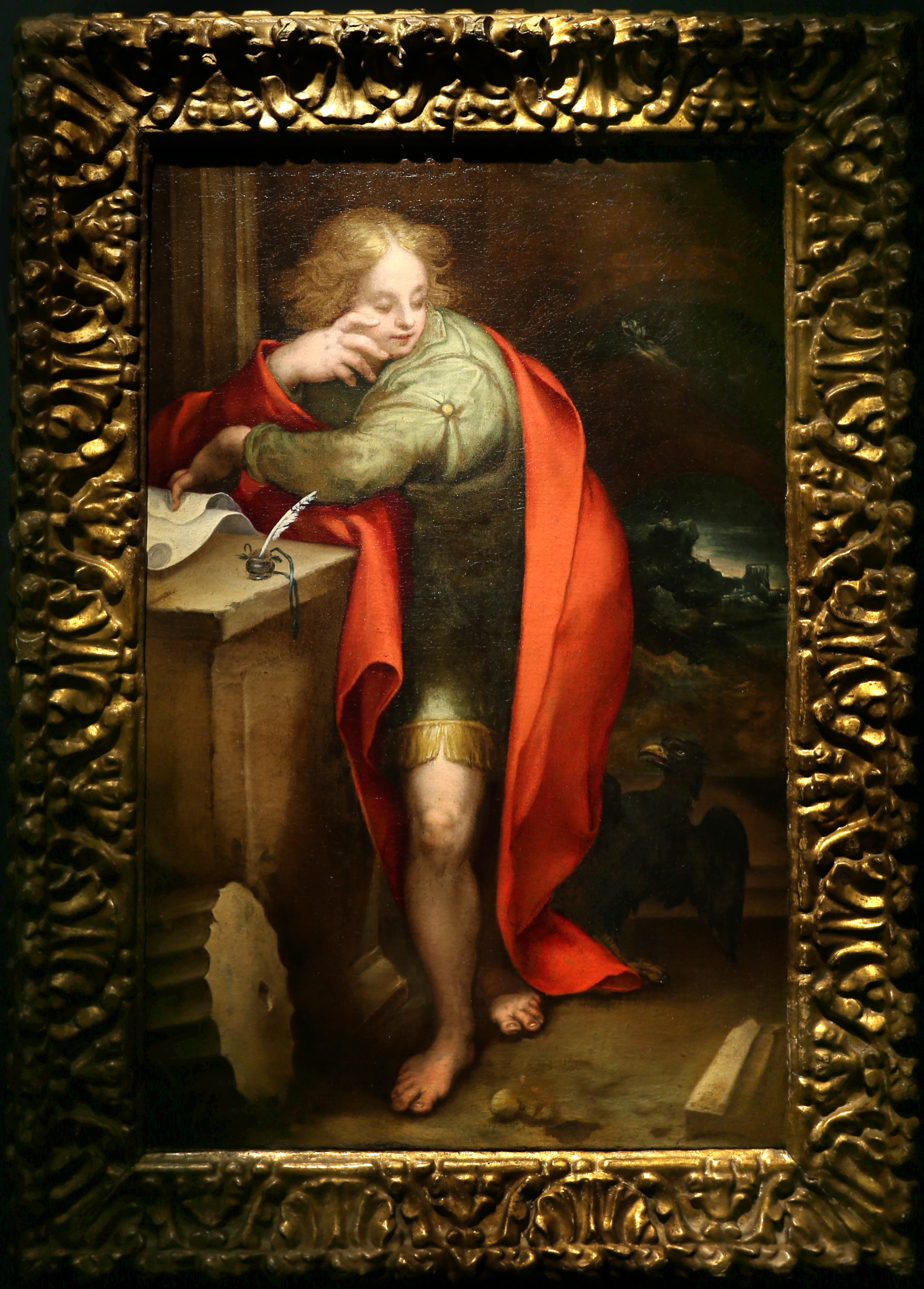
San Giovanni Evangelista

== Sources ==
- Dionysius Calvaert info, newadvent.org. Accessed 23 February 2024.
