= Innocenzo di Pietro Francucci da Imola =

Italian painter

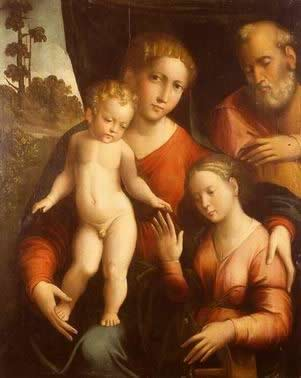
The Mystical Marriage of Saint Catherine, Filangieri Museum, Naples.

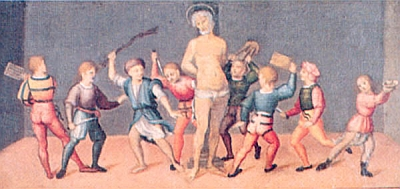
The Martyrdom of Saint Cassian of Imola.

Innocenzo (di Pietro) Francucci (c. 1490 – c. 1550), generally known as Innocenzo da Imola, was an Italian painter and draftsman.

== Biography ==
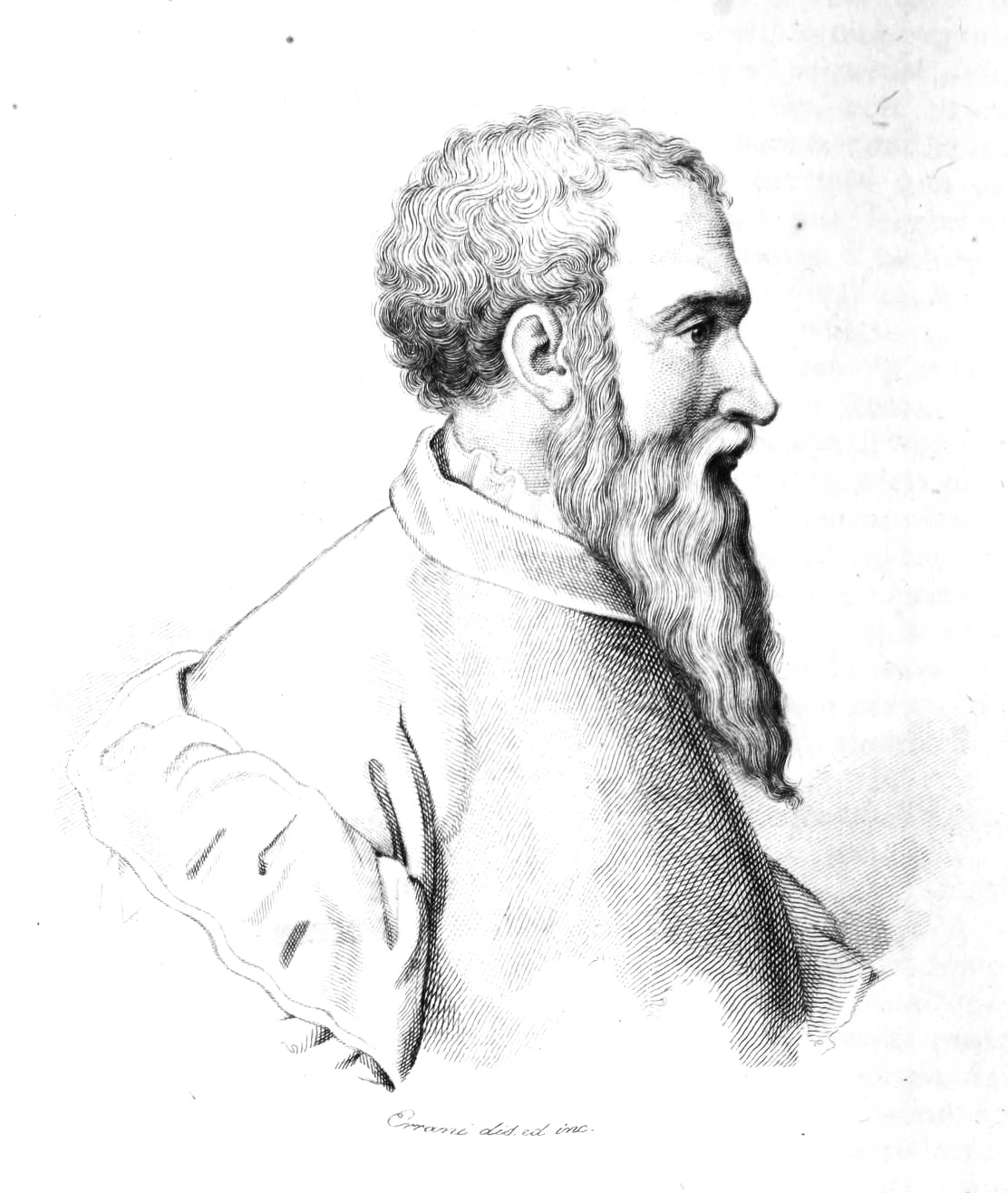

The son of a goldsmith named Pietro, he was born in Imola sometime around 1490. After presumably studying with his father in Imola, by 1506 he had moved to nearby Bologna to study painting. According to Carlo Cesare Malvasia he entered the studio of Francesco Francia in 1508 (although the reliability of this claim has been questioned). He later went to Florence where in 1510 he worked under the direction of Mariotto Albertinelli.

His earliest known works include The Virgin and Child with Saints Sebastian, Roch, Cosmas and Damian was signed and dated in 1515. The Virgin and Child with Saints John, Apollinaris and Catherine and a Bishop, signed and dated in 1516. This second painting is in Cásola Valsenio, near Bologna.

During his life he produced a series of religious frescoes and altarpieces, painted in a Raphaelesque manner. His only secular paintings are five mythological frescoes in the Palazzina della Viola in Bologna. He trained artists such as Francesco Primaticcio, Prospero Fontana, and Pietro Lamo. The Church of Santa Maria Dei Servi in Bologna has interior paintings by Francucci.

Francucci died in Bologna around 1550.

== Known works ==
- The Virgin and Child with Saints Sebastian, Roch, Cosmas and Damian (1515) - Bagnara di Romagna - Museum
- The Holy Family (c. 1515) - Bagnara di Romagna - private collection
- The Virgin and Child with Saints John, Apollinaris and Catherine and a Bishop (1516) Casola Valsenio
- Study of an Angel and of Drapery (c. 1520) - Getty Museum
- The Virgin and Child with Saints John the Baptist, Peter and Paul, Joachim and Anne (1526), Faenza Cathedral
- The Virgin of the Rosary (1531), church of San Domenico fuori le mura, Catania
- The Mystic Marriage of St. Catherine of Siena, Filangieri Museum, Naples
- Madonna and Child in Glory and the Saints Archangel Michael,
  and Peter Benedict, Pinacoteca Nazionale di Bologna
- St. John the Evangelist, La Salle University
