= Portrait of the Gozzadini Family =

1584 painting by Lavinia Fontana

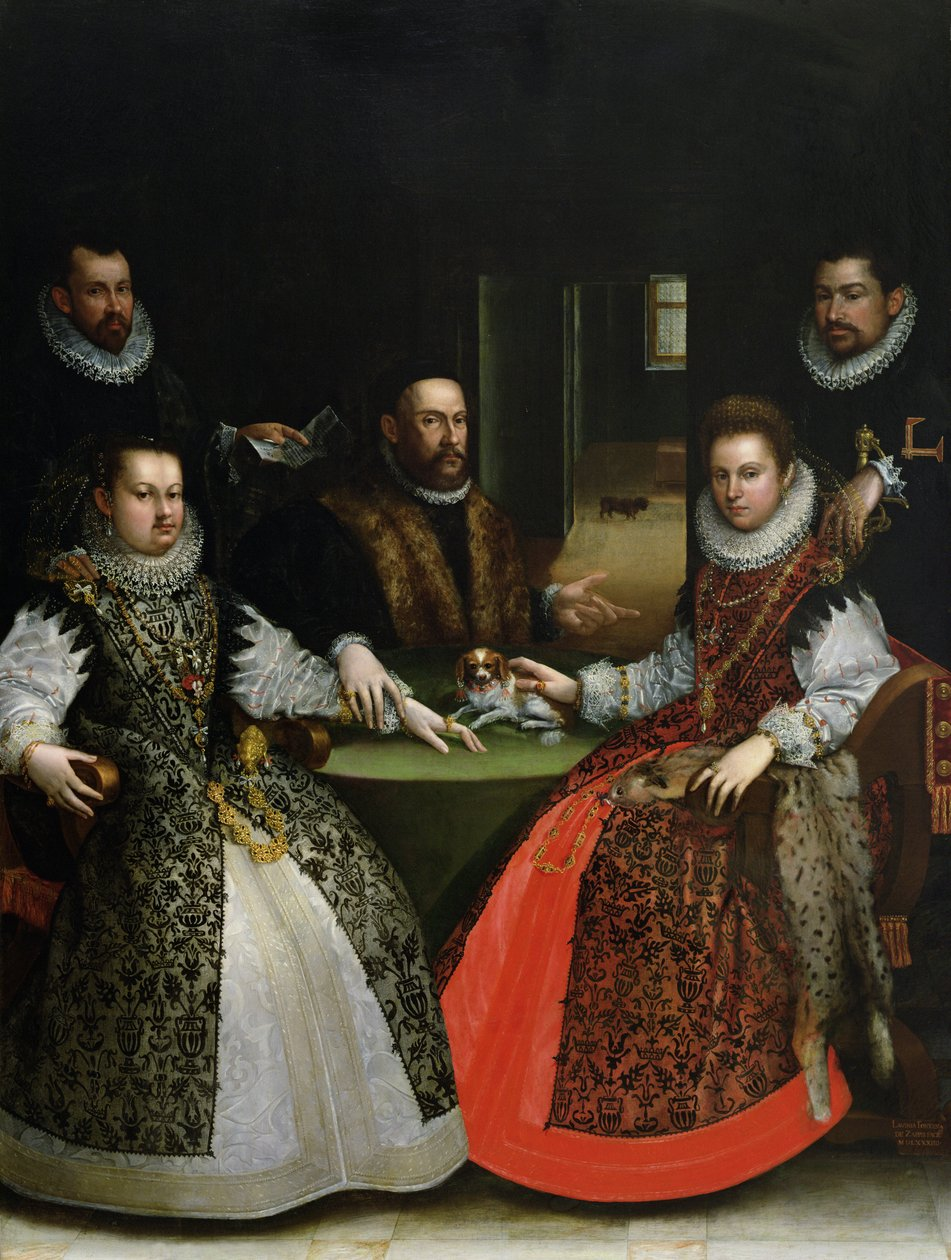
Portrait of the Gozzadini Family, 1584, oil on canvas, 250 x 189 cm, Pinacoteca Nazionale, Bologna

Portrait of the Gozzadini Family (Italian: La Famiglia Gozzadini) (never formally titled) is an oil on canvas painting by Bolognese artist Lavinia Fontana, from 1584. It hangs in the Pinacoteca Nazionale, in Bologna.

== Painting ==
This Mannerist painting depicts Laudomia Gozzadini, the painting's commissioner, and her sister Ginevra in the foreground, their father Senator Ulisse Gozzadini seated with them, and their husbands Camillo and Annibale standing behind. Ulisse and Ginevra, who are linked by his hand on her arm, were deceased at the time of the painting. Between her and her late family, Laudomia's hand rests on a dog, a symbol of fidelity, perhaps symbolizing her loyalty to their memory. In the back of the portrait, another small black dog reflects the masculine wandering of the sisters' husbands. The two women are dressed in full wedding regalia, Laudomia in a bold red that sets her apart from the other more neutrally attired subjects. Camillo's sword and cross signify his identity as a knight of the Portuguese Order of Christ, while the paper in Annibale's hand may allude to his control over the sisters' finances.

== Commission ==
This portrait was artist Lavinia Fontana's first documented commission. It is suggested that Laudomia Gozzadini commissioned this portrait as a statement of her legitimacy and patrimonial rights, and/or to memorialize Ulisse and Ginvera. Correspondence shows that Annibale, the executor of Ulisse's will, owed Laudomia money; over this conflict she took him to court and won. Painting the sisters in their decadent wedding jewelry, purchased by their father, is interpreted as a reminder that the money they brought with them into their marriages is ultimately of their own inheritance, and not to be withheld from them by their husbands. Compositional support for this theory includes the rendering of the sisters in front of their husbands, taking up much more space, light falling directly onto their faces, while their husbands fade into the dark background. On the topic of wealth, the sisters' father had declared a competition that whichever sister was able to produce a viable heir first would inherit the family fortune; Ginvera won this competition, a potential reason for resentment between her and her sister. It has been suggested that Laudomia requested Fontana paint Ginvera in an unflattering way in this portrait as a result of this resentment.

== Relationship between Laudomia Gozzadini and Lavinia Fontana ==
Painter Lavinia Fontana and patron Laudomia Gozzadini, close in age, shared a close relationship beyond the commission of the portrait. Fontana's ability to paint Ginvera accurately in the portrait despite her having died and been buried at the time of painting suggests that Fontana spent time with the family, and may have known Ginvera in life. Laudomia was made godmother to Lavinia's son, Severo, and Lavinia named her daughter after Laudomia.

Lavinia likely painted other portraits of and for Laudomia, as the Gozzadini family's financial records reflect multiple payments made to Lavinia, and two additional portraits resembling Laudomia survive, one actually signed by Lavinia, and another in Lavinia's style left behind in the Gozzadini family's estate. While the exact number of portraits is unknown, a survey of the Gozzadini's portraits described molto ritratti by Fontana in inventory, indicating some large, unspecified number.

Lavinia Fontana's occupation as a female portrait painter was unusual, and in some ways, unsustainable. Her friendship with Laudomia Gozzadini allowed her to practice and profit from her art, and records reflect that some of Fontana's patrons were friends of the Gozzadini family, suggesting that the portrait was of such quality that others asked after the painter, and/or that Laudomia helped her friend get commissions.

== Laudomia Gozzadini's Will ==
In an unusual choice for the time period, Laudomia left special instructions for care of the portrait in her will.

The first draft of the will included a note reading: "great and beautiful painting of the father of the testator, the testator herself, her sister and their husbands, by the hand of the excellent painter, Lavinia Fontana." She instructed that the painting be given to Camillo and thereafter kept in the Gozzadini family, rather than being taken by her daughter's husbands. She also requested that whoever should inherit the portrait would pray to Saint Jerome for the souls of the people depicted in the portrait.

A second draft of the will included the note: "a great and beautiful picture with the image of the father of the testator, the testator herself, her sister, their husbands, by the hand of Lavinia Fontana, the famous painter, honourable in everything." She also changed her request that the figures in the portrait be prayed for to that they simply be "remembered"

In a final draft of her will, she removed all requests for prayers or remembrances, but she did ultimately request that the portrait be entrusted to her two daughters, Placidia and Berenice.
