= Prospero Fontana =

Italian painter

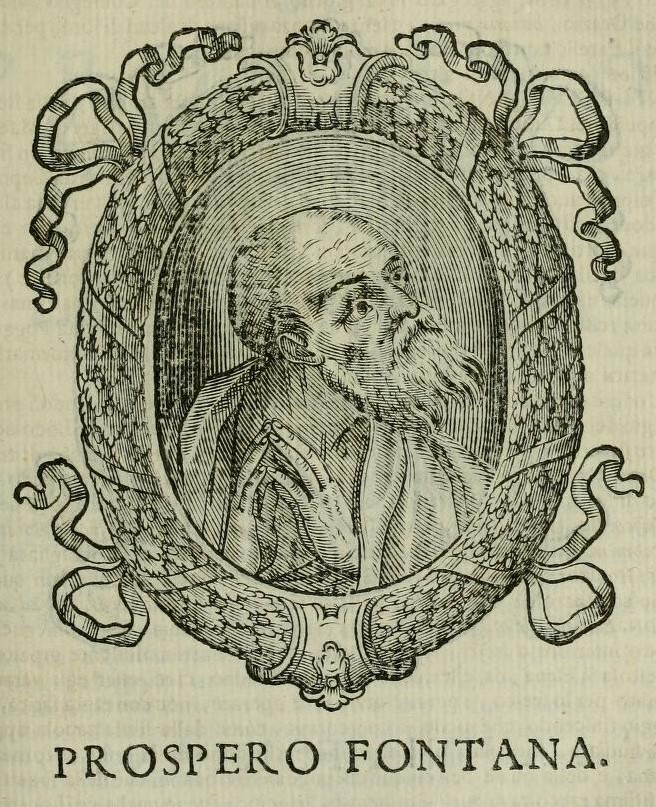
- Born: 1512; Bologna
- Died: 1597 (aged 84–85); Bologna, Papal States
- Education: Innocenzo da Imola
- Known for: Painting
- Movement: Mannerism
- Children: 3, including Lavinia
- Elected: Accademia delle Arti del Disegno
- Patrons: Pope Julius III

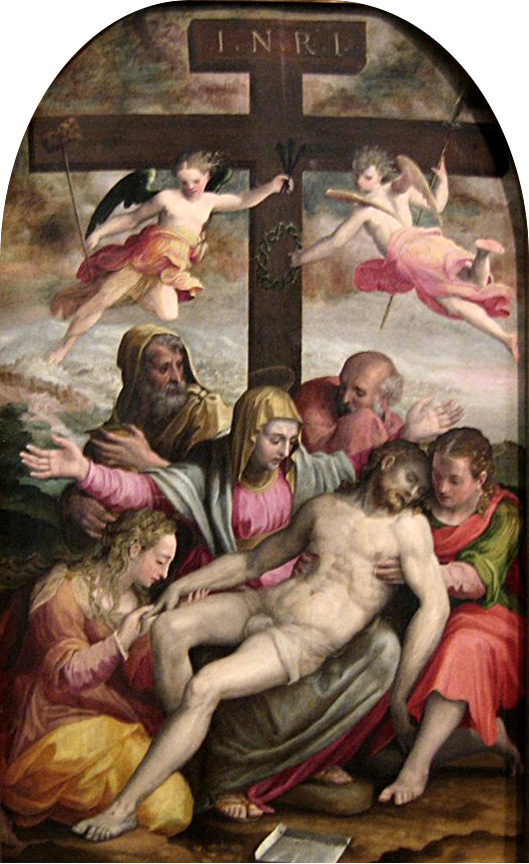
Prospero Fontana, The Deposition, 1563, oil on poplar panel, Art Gallery of New South Wales

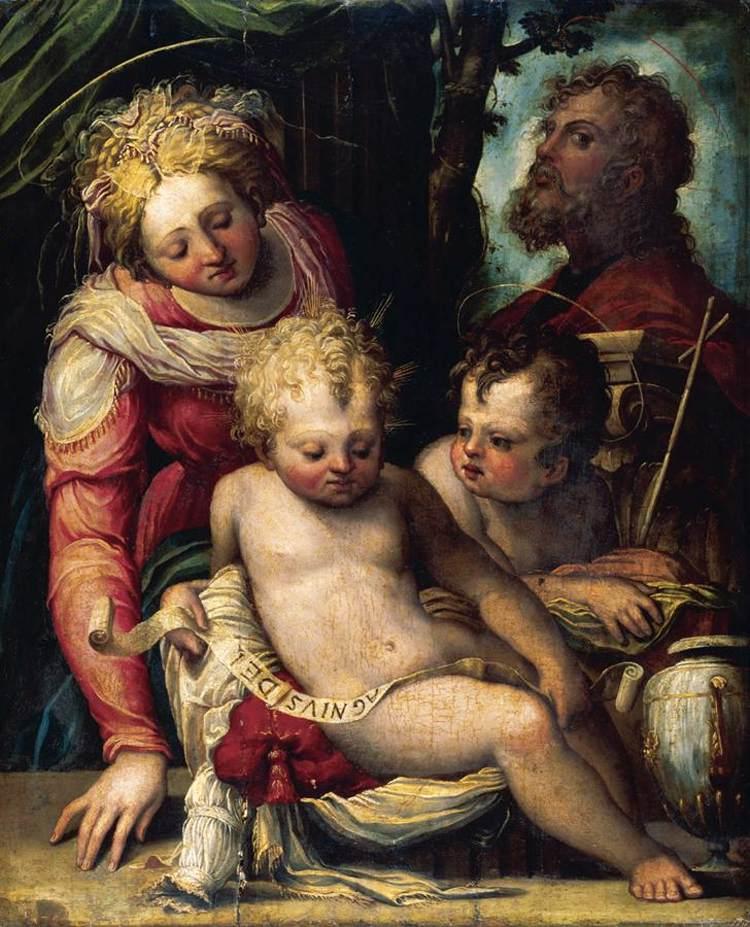
Holy Family with the Infant St. John the Baptist, c. 1548–51, oil on panel

Prospero Fontana (1512–1597) was an Italian painter of late Renaissance and Mannerist art. He is perhaps best known for his frescoes and architectural detailing. The speed in which he completed paintings earned him commissions where he worked with other prominent artists of the period. He was a prominent figure in the city of Bologna, serving as official arbitrator in the business disputes of local artists. In his later career Fontana trained younger painters, including his own daughter Lavinia.

== Professional life ==
Prospero Fontana was likely taught by Innocenzo di Pietro Francucci da Imola, but there is a degree of uncertainty surrounding the relationship between the two men. As a teenager, Fontana was an assistant on Perino del Vaga's Palazzo Doria in Genoa. However, art historians cannot definitively identity Fontana's contributions to the decorations.

In the 1550s, Fontana painted Pope Julius III's portrait and was pensioned at the pontifical court. He also decorated the Palazzo di Firenze for the Pope's brother, Balduino del Monte. During his time in Rome, he collaborated with Taddeo Zuccaro on the Villa Giulia in Rome (1553). J. A. Gere suggests that Fontana supervised the project and was responsible for the paintings in the North Room.

Fontana worked with Giorgio Vasari on a few commissions, which are briefly described in the Lives of the Most Excellent Painters, Sculptors and Architects. Vasari notes that Fontana was unable to complete his work on the Chateau of Fontainebleau (1560) in France due to a health issue. Finished collaborative work includes the Palazzo Vecchio in Florence (1563–1565). Florian Härb observes the similarities between several of Vasari's drawings and Fontana's larger paintings, which indicate that the drawings were the basis for much of Fontana's commissions. There are multiple explanations offered by Härb and Charles Davis, including Fontana's admiration of Vasari's style and prominence in Renaissance Italy.

In 1565, Fontana was elected to the Accademia delle Arti del Disegno in Florence. In 1576, Fontana was one of several artists and intellectuals consulted by Cardinal Gabriele Paleotti in the debate over the reformation of religious art.

Pellegrino Tabaldi and Fontana worked on the Cappella Poggi in S Giacomo Maggiore in Bologna.

Towards the end of his career, Fontana opened a school of art in Bologna. Some of his most notable students were Ludovico Carracci, Agostino Carracci, Lorenzo Sabbatini, and Denys Calvaert. In Bologna, Fontana served as an arbitrator and resolved professional disputes. Robert W. Gaston explains that this was a prestigious position at the time.

Fontana died in Bologna in 1597. The altarpiece of the Adoration of the Magi, in the church of Santa Maria delle Grazie, is considered to be his masterpiece. A large quantity of his work remains in Bologna.

== Artistry ==
=== Artistic influences ===
The majority of the artists who trained and collaborated with Fontana were heavily influenced by Raphael. He also looked to the work of Antonio da Correggio, Sebastiano del Piombo, and Giulio Romano.

=== Style ===
Fontana was well known for the speed in which he completed commissions. Carlo Cesare Malvasia criticized him for being careless and unprofessional.

His early style is considered conservative. He gradually incorporated elements of Mannerism into his style after working with prominent artists of the movement. He is an early representative of the Bolognese school of painting. His style has been compared to that of Paolo Veronese.

== Major works ==
- Holy Family with the Infant Saint John the Baptist, 1545, oil on canvas — Church of Santa Maria del Baraccano, Bologna
- Beata Diana Andalò professing with Saint Dominic, 1545, oil on panel — San Domenico, Bologna
- Disputa di Santa Caterina, 1551, oil on panel, 361 x 178 cm — Santa Maria del Baraccano, Bologna
- Julius III, 1553, oil on panel — Biblioteca Universitaria, Bologna

== Personal life ==
Prospero's father, Silvio Fontana, was a stonemason.

Prospero married Antonia de Bonardis in 1539. They had two daughters, Emilia and Lavinia. Emilia died in 1568, just five years after her wedding to Floriano Bertelli. Prospero taught his surviving daughter Lavinia how to paint in his workshop.
