= Michelangelus =

Typeface based on Michaelangelo's handwriting

- Category: Serif
- Commissioned by: Holy See
- Foundry: Microsoft
- Date created: 2026; 0 years ago
- Design based on: Handwriting of Michelangelo

Michelangelus is a typeface created by the Holy See in partnership with Microsoft to commemorate the 400th anniversary of the consecration of St. Peter's Basilica. The font has been modeled on the handwriting of Michelangelo. The typeface will be made available on the latest versions Microsoft Office. The Italian design studio studiogusto was directly involved in the process.

To develop the typeface, Microsoft engineers and studiogusto designers studied letters and other documents from within the Vatican Archives, that had been written by Michelangelo at the time of the basilica's construction.

In 2024, the Vatican commissioned Microsoft to digitally recreate St. Peter's Basilica, which can be viewed online. This began a series of events in preparation for the Basilicas 400th anniversary in 2026.
