= Febo di Poggio =

Italian model in Renaissance era

Febo di Poggio (fl. c.1534 CE) was an Italian youth, originally from Pisa, but later living in Florence, who was affiliated with the Renaissance artist Michelangelo.

Febo is known primarily through poetry and one letter, which Michelangelo addressed to him. The letter, dating from September of 1534, was written on the eve of Michelangelos' departure from Florence for Rome. Febo himself sent a letter to Michelangelo in January 1535. In this missive, Febo requests material favours from Michelangelo.

At this time, Febo was a young man, while Michelangelo was in his 50s. The exact nature of the relationship between Michelangelo and Febo di Poggio is unknown, though Michelangelo's poems and letter both speak of his love for Febo. According to Bambach et al. (2017), the letter Febo sent in reply "tacitly confirms the romantic nature of their rapport".

== References in Michelangelo's poetry ==
In Michelangelo's poem G.99, he alludes to Febo as Phoebus and further puns on his surname "del Poggio" which means "of the hill." This is clearly seen in the first stanza:

I truly should, so happy was my lot,
While Phoebus was inflaming all the hill,
Have risen from the earth while I was able,
Using his feathers and thus make my dying sweet.

Furthermore, Michelangelo shows his grief towards Febo when he states in the second stanza:

Now he left me. And if he vainly promised
To make me happy days go by less quickly.

The allusion to the bird is further re-iterated in the third stanza or the start of sextet:

His feathers were my wings, his hill my steps,
Phoebus was a lamp for my feet. To die then
Would have been my salvation and pleasure.

Michelangelo was so affected by Febo that he ends the poem with references to classical death:

Now dying without him, my soul won't rise to Heaven.

In the poem G.100, Michelangelo alludes to Poggio as Apollo when he states:

To me Heaven was surely merciless,
Fusing your live beam on two eyes alone,
when, with its rapid and eternal motion,
The journey it gave to you, the light to us
