= Michelangelo =

Italian artist and architect (1475–1564)

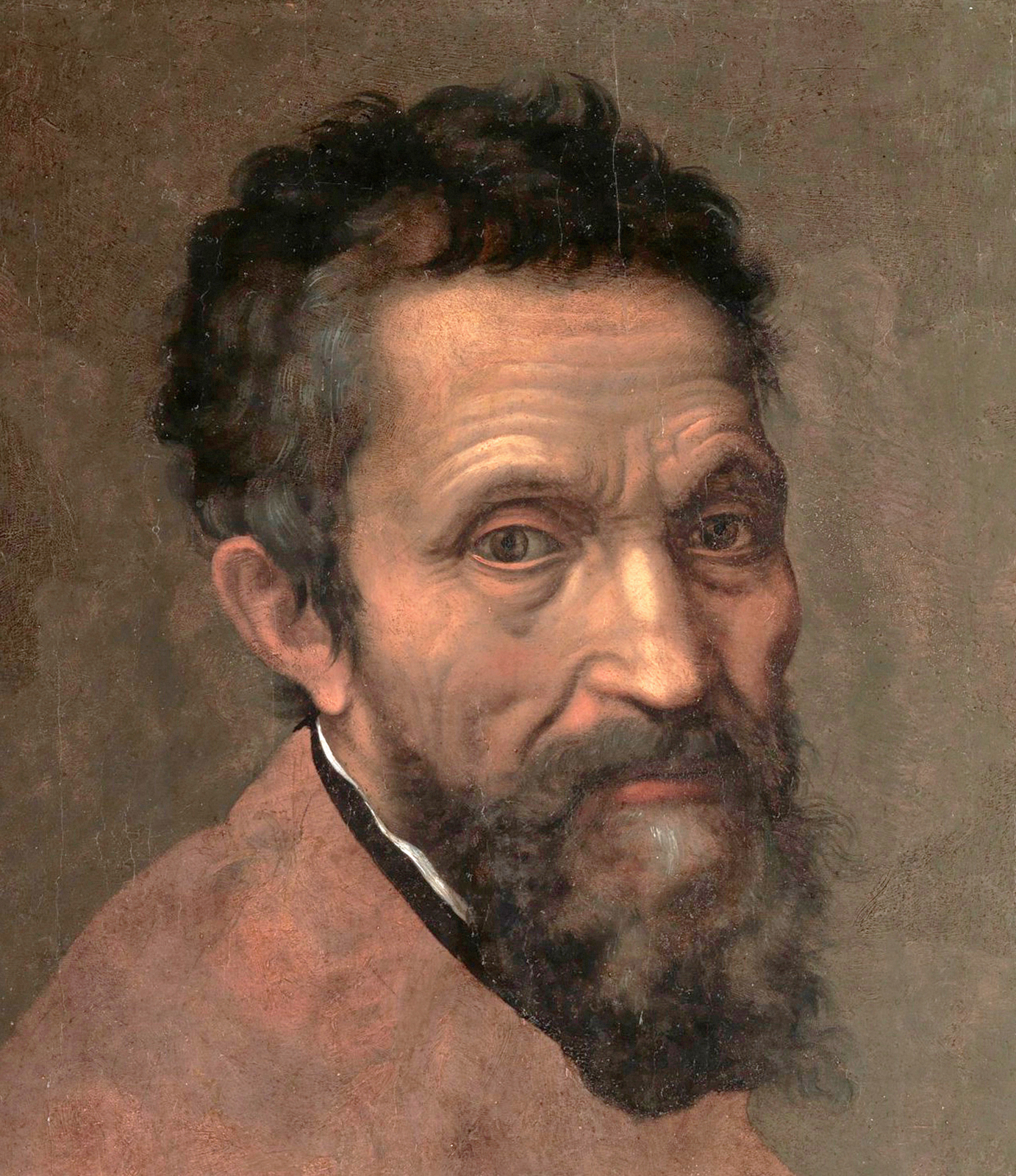
- Portrait by Daniele da Volterra, c. 1545
- Born: Michelangelo di Lodovico Buonarroti Simoni; 6 March 1475; Caprese, Florence
- Died: 18 February 1564 (aged 88); Rome, Papal States
- Known for: Sculpture; painting; architecture; poetry
- Notable work: Pietà (1498–1499); David (1501–1504); Madonna of Bruges (1503–1505); Sistine Chapel ceiling (1508–1512); The Creation of Adam (c. 1512); Moses (1513–1515); The Last Judgment (1536–1541)
- Movement: High Renaissance; Mannerism

Michelangelo di Lodovico Buonarroti Simoni (Note: Italian: [mikeˈlandʒelo di lodoˈviːko ˌbwɔnarˈrɔːti siˈmoːni]) (6 March 1475 – 18 February 1564), known mononymously as Michelangelo, (Note: /ˌmaɪkəlˈændʒəloʊ, ˌmɪk-/ MY-kəl-AN-jə-loh, MIK-əl-) was an Italian sculptor, painter, architect, and poet of the High Renaissance. He was born in the Republic of Florence but was mostly active in Rome from his 30s onwards. His work was inspired by models from classical antiquity and had a lasting influence on Western art. Michelangelo's creative abilities and mastery in a range of artistic arenas define him as an archetypal Renaissance man, along with his rival and elder contemporary, Leonardo da Vinci. Given the sheer volume of surviving correspondence, sketches, and reminiscences, Michelangelo is one of the best-documented artists of the 16th century.

Michelangelo achieved fame early. Two of his best-known works, the Pietà and David, were sculpted before the age of 30. Although he did not consider himself a painter, Michelangelo created two of the most influential frescoes in the history of Western art: the scenes from Genesis on the ceiling of the Sistine Chapel in Rome, and The Last Judgment on its altar wall. His design of the Laurentian Library pioneered Mannerist architecture. At the age of 71, he succeeded Antonio da Sangallo the Younger as the architect of St. Peter's Basilica. Michelangelo transformed the plan so that the Western end was finished to his design, as was the dome, with some modification, after his death.

Michelangelo was the first Western artist whose biography was published during his lifetime. Giorgio Vasari's Lives (1550), in which he was the only living artist given a biography, presented his work as the culmination of the revival of the arts and called him divino, an honorific then extended to several celebrated writers and artists. Ascanio Condivi's Life (1553), prepared with Michelangelo's participation, corrected Vasari in places, and Vasari incorporated much of it into his expanded edition of 1568. His contemporaries admired his terribilità—his ability to instill a sense of awe in viewers of his art. Attempts by subsequent artists to imitate the expressive physicality of Michelangelo's style contributed to the rise of Mannerism, a short-lived movement in Western art between the High Renaissance and the Baroque.

== Biography ==
=== Early life, 1475–1488 ===
Michelangelo di Lodovico Buonarroti Simoni was born on 6 March 1475 (Note: Michelangelo's father marks the date as 6 March 1474 in the Florentine manner ab Incarnatione. However, in the Roman manner, ab Nativitate, it is 1475.) in Caprese, known today as Caprese Michelangelo, a small town situated in Valtiberina, near Arezzo, Tuscany. For several generations, his family had been small-scale bankers in Florence; but the bank failed, and his father Ludovico briefly took a government post in Caprese. At the time of Michelangelo's birth, his father was the town's judicial administrator and podestà (local administrator) of Chiusi della Verna. Michelangelo's mother was Francesca di Neri del Miniato di Siena. The Buonarrotis claimed to descend from the Countess Matilde di Canossa—a claim that remains unproven, but which Michelangelo believed.

Several months after Michelangelo's birth, the family returned to Florence, where he was raised. During his mother's later prolonged illness, and after her death in 1481 (when he was six years old), Michelangelo lived with a nanny and her husband, a stonecutter, in the town of Settignano, where his father owned a marble quarry and a small farm. There the young boy gained his love for working marble. As his biographer Giorgio Vasari quotes him:

If there is some good in me, it is because I was born in the subtle atmosphere of your country of Arezzo. Along with the milk of my nurse I received the knack of handling chisel and hammer, with which I make my figures.

=== Apprenticeships, 1488–1492 ===
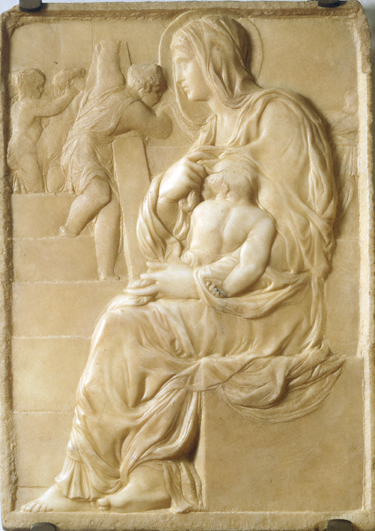
The Madonna of the Stairs (1490–1492), Michelangelo's earliest known work in marble

As a young boy, Michelangelo was sent to the city of Florence to study grammar under the Humanist Francesco da Urbino. (Note: Sources disagree as to how old Michelangelo was when he departed for school. De Tolnay writes that it was at ten years old while Sedgwick notes in her translation of Condivi that Michelangelo was seven.) Michelangelo showed no interest in his schooling, preferring to copy paintings from churches and seek the company of other painters. Florence was at that time Italy's greatest centre of the arts and learning. Art was sponsored by the Signoria (the town council), the merchant guilds, and wealthy patrons such as the Medici and their banking associates. The Renaissance, a renewal of Classical scholarship and the arts, had its first flowering in Florence. In the early 15th century, the architect Filippo Brunelleschi, having studied the remains of Classical buildings in Rome, had created two churches, San Lorenzo's and Santo Spirito, which embodied the Classical precepts. The sculptor Lorenzo Ghiberti had laboured for 50 years to create the north and east bronze doors of the Baptistry, which Michelangelo was to describe as "The Gates of Paradise". The exterior niches of the Church of Orsanmichele contained a gallery of works by the most acclaimed sculptors of Florence: Donatello, Ghiberti, Andrea del Verrocchio, and Nanni di Banco. The interiors of the older churches were covered with frescos (mostly in Late Medieval, but also in the Early Renaissance style), begun by Giotto and continued by Masaccio in the Brancacci Chapel, both of whose works Michelangelo studied and copied in drawings.

During Michelangelo's childhood, a team of painters had been called from Florence to the Vatican to decorate the walls of the Sistine Chapel. Among them was Domenico Ghirlandaio, a master in fresco painting, perspective, figure drawing and portraiture who had the largest workshop in Florence. In 1488, at the age of 13, Michelangelo was apprenticed to Ghirlandaio. The next year, his father persuaded Ghirlandaio to pay Michelangelo as an artist, which was rare for someone that young. When in 1489, Lorenzo de' Medici, de facto ruler of Florence, asked Ghirlandaio for his two best pupils, Ghirlandaio sent Michelangelo and Francesco Granacci.

From 1490 to 1492, Michelangelo attended the Platonic Academy, a Humanist academy founded by the Medicis. There, his work and outlook were influenced by many of the most prominent philosophers and writers of the day, including Marsilio Ficino, Pico della Mirandola and Poliziano. At this time, Michelangelo sculpted the "flattened reliefs", Madonna of the Stairs and Battle of the Centaurs, the latter based on a theme suggested by Poliziano and commissioned by Lorenzo de' Medici. Michelangelo worked for a time with the sculptor Bertoldo di Giovanni. When he was 17, another pupil, Pietro Torrigiano, struck him on the nose, causing the disfigurement that is conspicuous in the portraits of Michelangelo.

=== Bologna, Florence, and Rome, 1492–1499 ===
Lorenzo de' Medici's death on 8 April 1492 changed Michelangelo's circumstances. He left the security of the Medici court and returned to his father's house. In the following months he carved a polychrome wooden Crucifix (1493), as a gift to the prior of the Florentine church of Santo Spirito, which had allowed him to do some anatomical studies of the corpses from the church's hospital. This was the first of several instances during his career that Michelangelo studied anatomy by dissecting cadavers.

Between 1493 and 1494, Michelangelo bought a block of marble, and carved a larger-than-life statue of Hercules. (Note: The Hercules statue was sent to France and subsequently disappeared sometime in the 18th century. After the Strozzi family acquired it, Filippo Strozzi sold it to Francis I in 1529. In 1594, Henry IV installed it in the Jardin d'Estange at Fontainebleau where it disappeared in 1713 when the Jardin d'Estange was destroyed.) On 20 January 1494, after heavy snowfalls, Lorenzo's heir, Piero de Medici, commissioned a statue made of snow, and Michelangelo again entered the court of the Medici. In the same year, the Medici were expelled from Florence as the result of the rise of Savonarola. Michelangelo left the city before the end of the political upheaval, moving to Venice and then to Bologna. In Bologna, he was commissioned to carve several of the last small figures for the completion of the Shrine of St. Dominic, in the church dedicated to that saint. At this time Michelangelo studied the robust reliefs carved by Jacopo della Quercia around the main portal of the Basilica of St Petronius, including the panel of The Creation of Eve, the composition of which was to reappear on the Sistine Chapel ceiling. Towards the end of 1495, the political situation in Florence was calmer; the city, previously under threat from the French, was no longer in danger as Charles VIII had suffered defeats. Michelangelo returned to Florence but received no commissions from the new city government under Savonarola. He returned to the employment of the Medici. During the half-year he spent in Florence, he worked on two small statues, a child St. John the Baptist and a sleeping Cupid. According to Condivi, Lorenzo di Pierfrancesco de' Medici, for whom Michelangelo had sculpted St. John the Baptist, asked that Michelangelo "fix it so that it looked as if it had been buried" so he could "send it to Rome ... pass [it off as] an ancient work and ... sell it much better." Both Lorenzo and Michelangelo were unwittingly cheated out of the real value of the piece by a middleman. Cardinal Raffaele Riario, to whom Lorenzo had sold it, discovered that it was a fraud, but was so impressed by the quality of the sculpture that he invited the artist to Rome. (Note: Vasari makes no mention of this episode and Paolo Giovio's Life of Michelangelo indicates that Michelangelo tried to pass the statue off as an antique himself.) This apparent success in selling his sculpture abroad as well as the conservative Florentine situation may have encouraged Michelangelo to accept the prelate's invitation.

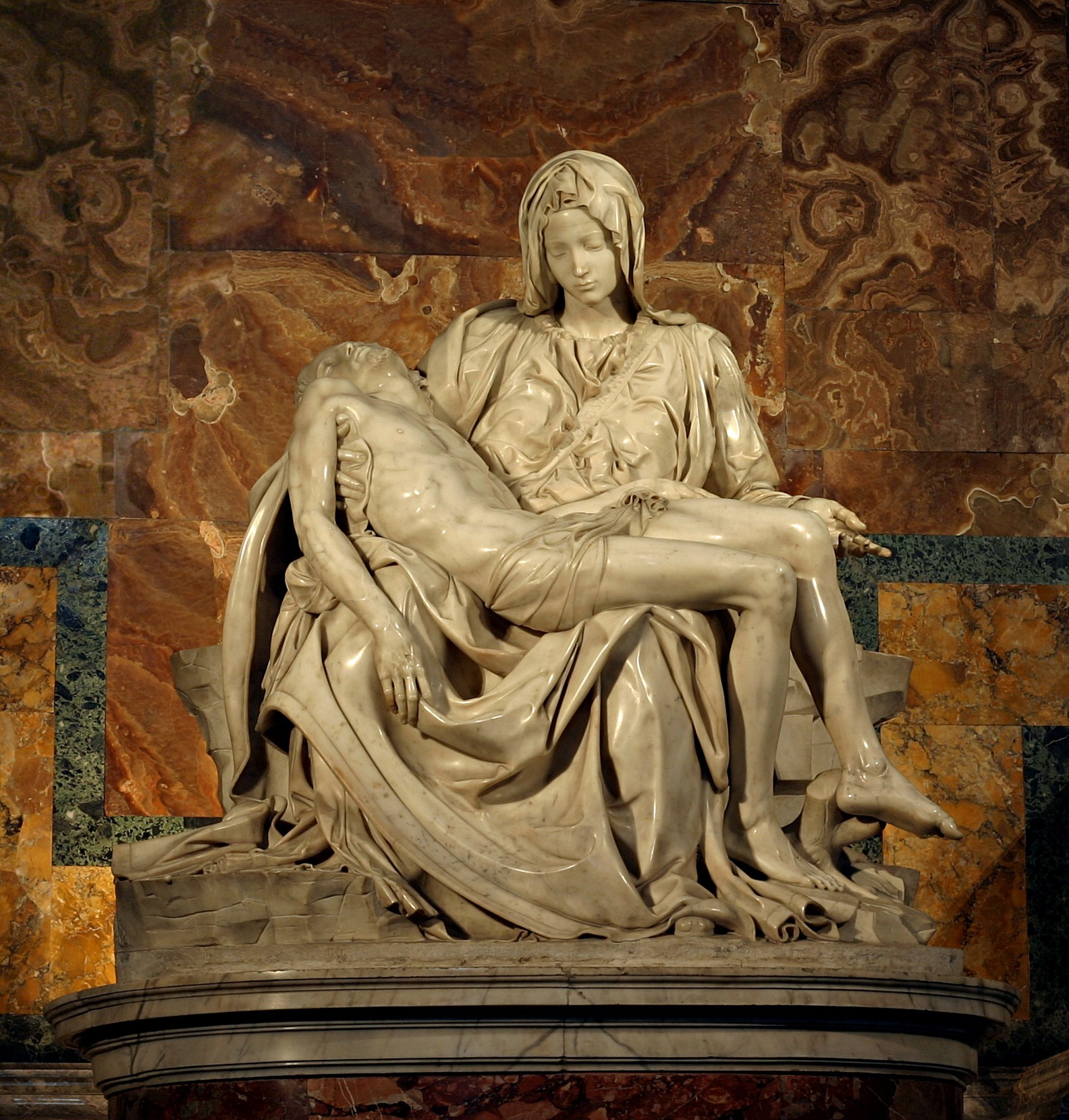
Pietà, St Peter's Basilica (1498–1499)

Michelangelo arrived in Rome on 25 June 1496 at the age of 21. On 4 July of the same year, he began work on a commission for Cardinal Riario, an over-life-size statue of the Roman wine god Bacchus. Upon completion, the work was rejected by the cardinal, and subsequently entered the collection of the banker Jacopo Galli, for his garden. In November 1497, the French ambassador to the Holy See, Cardinal Jean de Bilhères-Lagraulas, commissioned him to carve a Pietà, a sculpture showing the Virgin Mary grieving over the body of Jesus. The subject, which is not part of the Biblical narrative of the Crucifixion, was common in religious sculpture of medieval northern Europe and would have been very familiar to the Cardinal. The contract was agreed upon in August of the following year. Michelangelo was 24 at the time of its completion. It was soon to be regarded as one of the world's great masterpieces of sculpture, "a revelation of all the potentialities and force of the art of sculpture". Contemporary opinion was summarised by Vasari: "It is certainly a miracle that a formless block of stone could ever have been reduced to a perfection that nature is scarcely able to create in the flesh." Michelangelo's only work known to have been signed, his name on Mary's sash; it is now located in St Peter's Basilica.

=== Florence, 1499–1505 ===
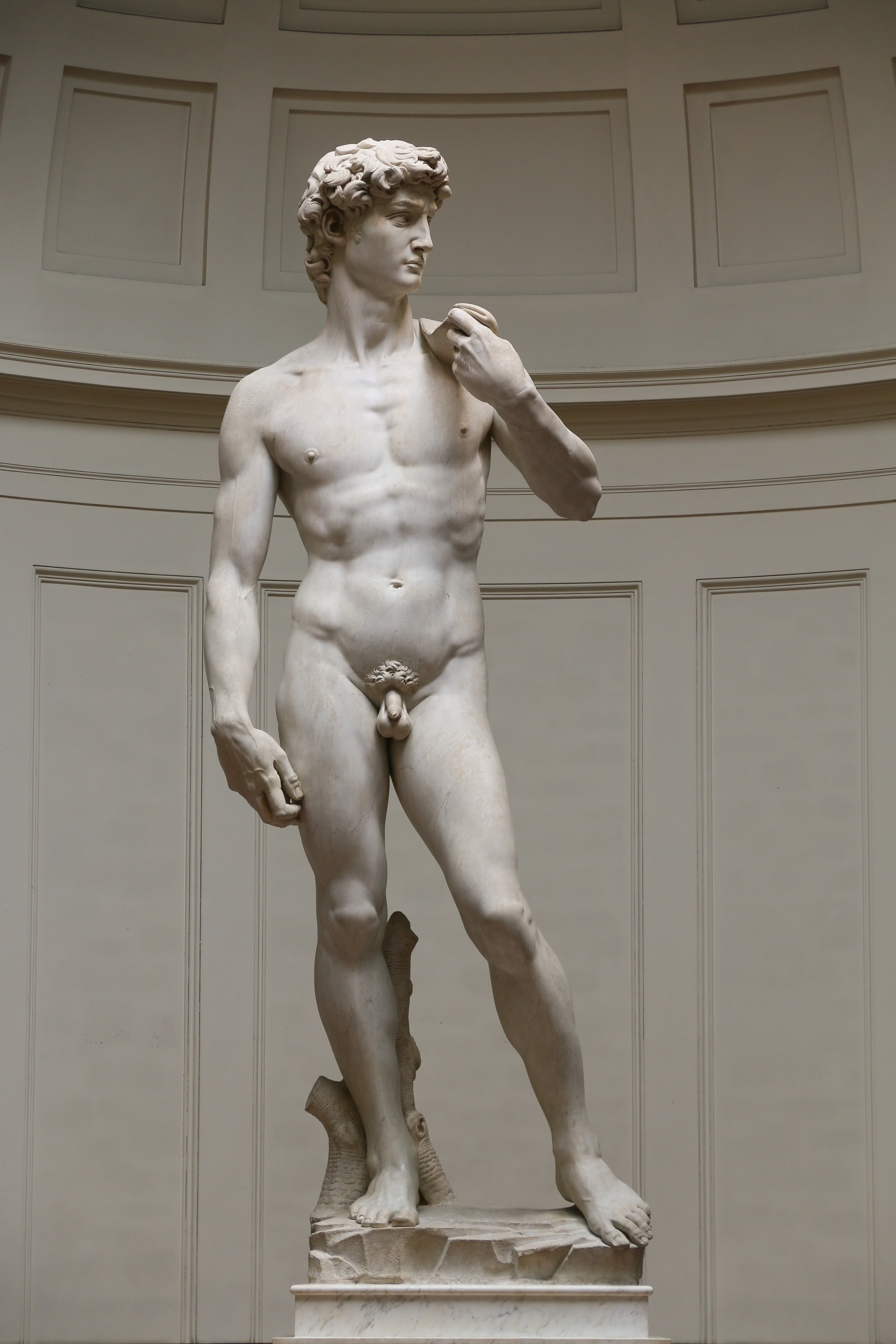
David, completed by Michelangelo in 1504, is one of the most renowned works of the Renaissance.

Michelangelo returned to Florence in 1499. The Republic was changing after the fall of its leader, anti-Renaissance priest Girolamo Savonarola, who was executed in 1498, and the rise of the gonfaloniere Piero Soderini. Michelangelo was asked by the consuls of the Guild of Wool to complete an unfinished project begun 40 years earlier by Agostino di Duccio: a colossal statue of Carrara marble portraying David as a symbol of Florentine freedom to be placed on the gable of Florence Cathedral. Michelangelo responded by completing his most famous work, the statue of David, in 1504. The masterwork definitively established his prominence as a sculptor of extraordinary technical skill and strength of symbolic imagination. A team of consultants, including Botticelli, Leonardo da Vinci, Filippino Lippi, Pietro Perugino, Lorenzo di Credi, Antonio and Giuliano da Sangallo, Andrea della Robbia, Cosimo Rosselli, Davide Ghirlandaio, Piero di Cosimo, Andrea Sansovino and Michelangelo's dear friend Granacci, was called together to decide upon its placement, ultimately the Piazza della Signoria, in front of the Palazzo Vecchio. It now stands in the Accademia, and in 1910 a marble replica was raised in its place in the square. In the same period of placing the David, Michelangelo may have been involved in creating the sculptural profile on Palazzo Vecchio's façade known as the Importuno di Michelangelo. The hypothesis of Michelangelo's possible involvement in the creation of the profile is based on the strong resemblance of the latter to a profile drawn by the artist, datable to the beginning of the 16th century, now preserved in the Louvre.

With the completion of the David came another commission. In early 1504 Leonardo da Vinci had been commissioned to paint The Battle of Anghiari in the council chamber of the Palazzo Vecchio, depicting the battle between Florence and Milan in 1440. Michelangelo was then commissioned to paint the Battle of Cascina. The two paintings are very different: Leonardo depicts soldiers fighting on horseback, while Michelangelo has soldiers being ambushed as they bathe in the river. Neither work was completed and both were lost forever when the chamber was refurbished. Both works were much admired, and copies remain of them, Leonardo's work having been copied by Rubens and Michelangelo's by Bastiano da Sangallo.

Also during this period, Michelangelo was commissioned by Angelo Doni to paint a "Holy Family" as a present for his wife, Maddalena Strozzi. It is known as the Doni Madonna and hangs in the Uffizi Gallery, still in its original magnificent frame, which Michelangelo may have designed. He also may have painted the Madonna and Child with John the Baptist, known as the Manchester Madonna and now in the National Gallery, London.

=== Tomb of Julius II, 1505–1545 ===
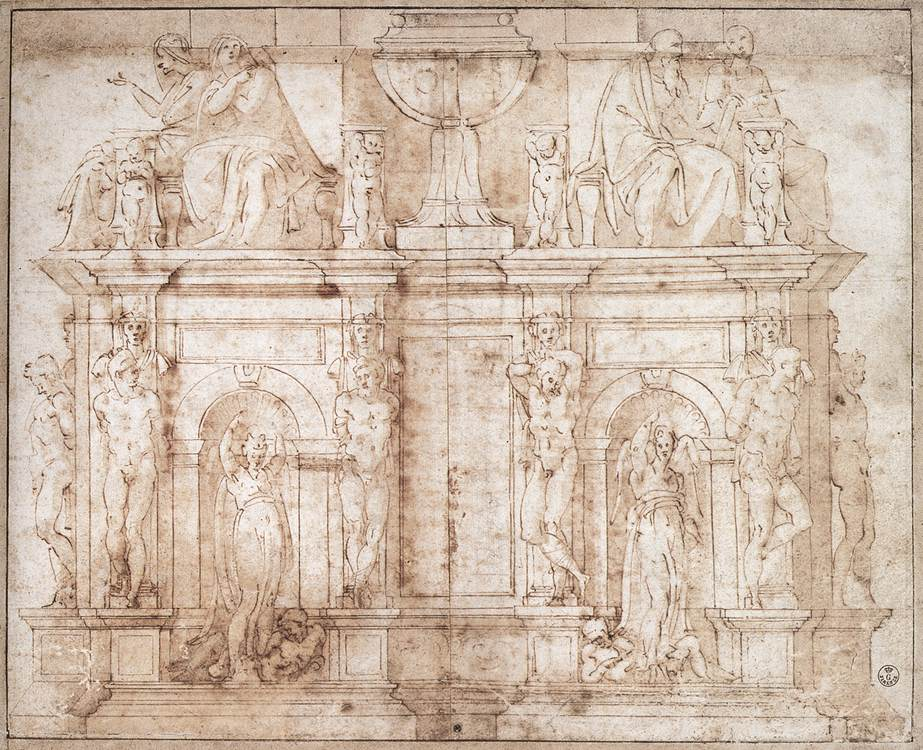
Michelangelo's second design for the monument of Pope Julius II

In 1505 Michelangelo was invited back to Rome by the newly elected Pope Julius II and commissioned to build the Pope's tomb, which was to include forty statues and be finished in five years. Under the patronage of the pope, Michelangelo experienced constant interruptions to his work on the tomb in order to accomplish numerous other tasks.

The commission for the tomb forced the artist to leave Florence with his planned Battle of Cascina painting unfinished. By this time, Michelangelo was established as an artist; both he and Julius II had hot tempers and soon argued. On 17 April 1506, Michelangelo left Rome in secret for Florence, remaining there until the Florentine government pressed him to return to the pope.

Although Michelangelo worked on the tomb for 40 years, it was never finished to his satisfaction. It is located in the Church of San Pietro in Vincoli in Rome and is most famous for the central figure of Moses, completed in 1516. Of the other statues intended for the tomb, two, known as the Rebellious Slave and the Dying Slave, are now in the Louvre.

=== Sistine Chapel ceiling, 1508 –1512 ===
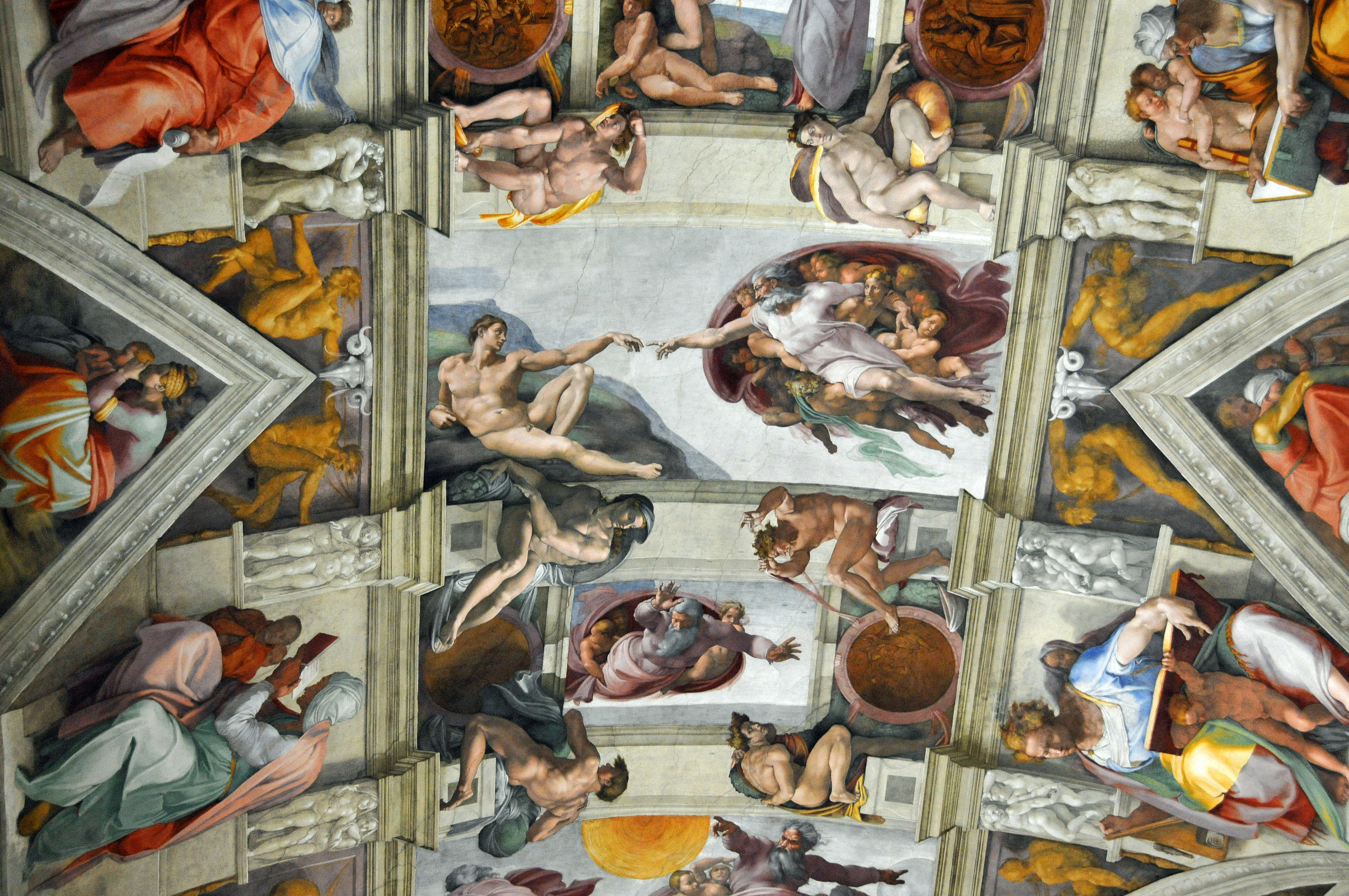
Michelangelo painted the ceiling of the Sistine Chapel; the work took approximately four years to complete (1508–1512).

During the same period, Michelangelo painted the ceiling of the Sistine Chapel, which took approximately four years to complete (1508–1512). According to Condivi's account, Bramante, who was working on the building of St. Peter's Basilica, resented Michelangelo's commission for the pope's tomb and convinced the pope to commission him in a medium with which he was unfamiliar, in order that he might fail at the task. Michelangelo was originally commissioned to paint the Twelve Apostles on the triangular pendentives that supported the ceiling, and to cover the central part of the ceiling with ornament. Michelangelo persuaded Pope Julius II to give him a free hand and proposed a different and more complex scheme, representing the Creation, the Fall of Man, the Promise of Salvation through the prophets, and the genealogy of Christ. The work is part of a larger scheme of decoration within the chapel that represents elements of the doctrine of the Catholic Church.

The composition stretches over 500 square metres of ceiling and contains over 300 figures. At its centre are nine episodes from the Book of Genesis, divided into three groups: God's creation of the earth; God's creation of humankind and their fall from God's grace; and lastly, the state of humanity as represented by Noah and his family. On the pendentives supporting the ceiling are painted twelve men and women who prophesied the coming of Jesus, seven prophets of Israel, and five Sibyls, prophetic women of the Classical world. Among the most famous paintings on the ceiling are The Creation of Adam, Adam and Eve in the Garden of Eden, the Deluge, the Prophet Jeremiah, and the Cumaean Sibyl.

=== Florence under Medici popes, 1513 – early 1534 ===
In 1513, Pope Julius II died and was succeeded by Pope Leo X, the second son of Lorenzo de' Medici. From 1513 to 1516, Pope Leo was on good terms with Pope Julius's surviving relatives, so he encouraged Michelangelo to continue work on Julius's tomb, but the families became enemies again in 1516 when Pope Leo tried to seize the Duchy of Urbino from Julius's nephew Francesco Maria I della Rovere. Pope Leo then had Michelangelo stop working on the tomb, and commissioned him to reconstruct the façade of the Basilica of San Lorenzo in Florence and to adorn it with sculptures. He spent three years creating drawings and models for the façade, as well as attempting to open a new marble quarry at Pietrasanta specifically for the project. In 1520, the work was abruptly cancelled by his financially strapped patrons before any real progress had been made. The basilica lacks a façade to this day.

In 1520, the Medici came back to Michelangelo with another grand proposal, this time for a family funerary chapel in the Basilica of San Lorenzo. For posterity, this project, occupying the artist for much of the 1520s and 1530s, was more fully realised. Michelangelo used his own discretion to create the composition of the Medici Chapel, which houses the large tombs of two of the younger members of the Medici family, Giuliano, Duke of Nemours, and Lorenzo, his nephew. It also serves to commemorate their more famous predecessors, Lorenzo the Magnificent and his brother Giuliano, who are buried nearby. The tombs display statues of the two Medici and allegorical figures representing Night and Day, and Dusk and Dawn. The chapel also contains Michelangelo's Medici Madonna. In 1976, a concealed corridor was discovered with drawings on the walls that related to the chapel itself.

Pope Leo X died in 1521 and was succeeded briefly by the austere Adrian VI, and then by his cousin Giulio Medici as Pope Clement VII. In 1524, Michelangelo received an architectural commission from the Medici pope for the Laurentian Library at San Lorenzo's Church. He designed both the interior of the library itself and its vestibule, a building utilising architectural forms with such dynamic effect that it is seen as the forerunner of Baroque architecture. It was left to assistants to interpret his plans and carry out construction. The library was not opened until 1571, and the vestibule remained incomplete until 1904.

In 1527, Florentine citizens, encouraged by the sack of Rome, threw out the Medici and restored the republic. A siege of the city ensued, and Michelangelo went to the aid of his beloved Florence by working on the city's fortifications from 1528 to 1529. The city fell in 1530, and the Medici were restored to power, with the young Alessandro Medici as the first Duke of Florence. Pope Clement, a Medici, sentenced Michelangelo to death. It is thought that Michelangelo hid for two months in a small chamber under the Medici chapels in the Basilica of San Lorenzo with light from just a tiny window, making many charcoal and chalk drawings which remained hidden until the room was rediscovered in 1975, and opened to small numbers of visitors in 2023. Michelangelo was eventually pardoned by the Medicis and the death sentence lifted, so that he could complete work on the Sistine Chapel and the Medici family tomb. He left Florence for Rome in 1534. Despite Michelangelo's support of the republic and resistance to the Medici rule, Pope Clement reinstated an allowance that he had previously granted the artist and made a new contract with him over the tomb of Pope Julius.

=== Rome, 1534–1546 ===
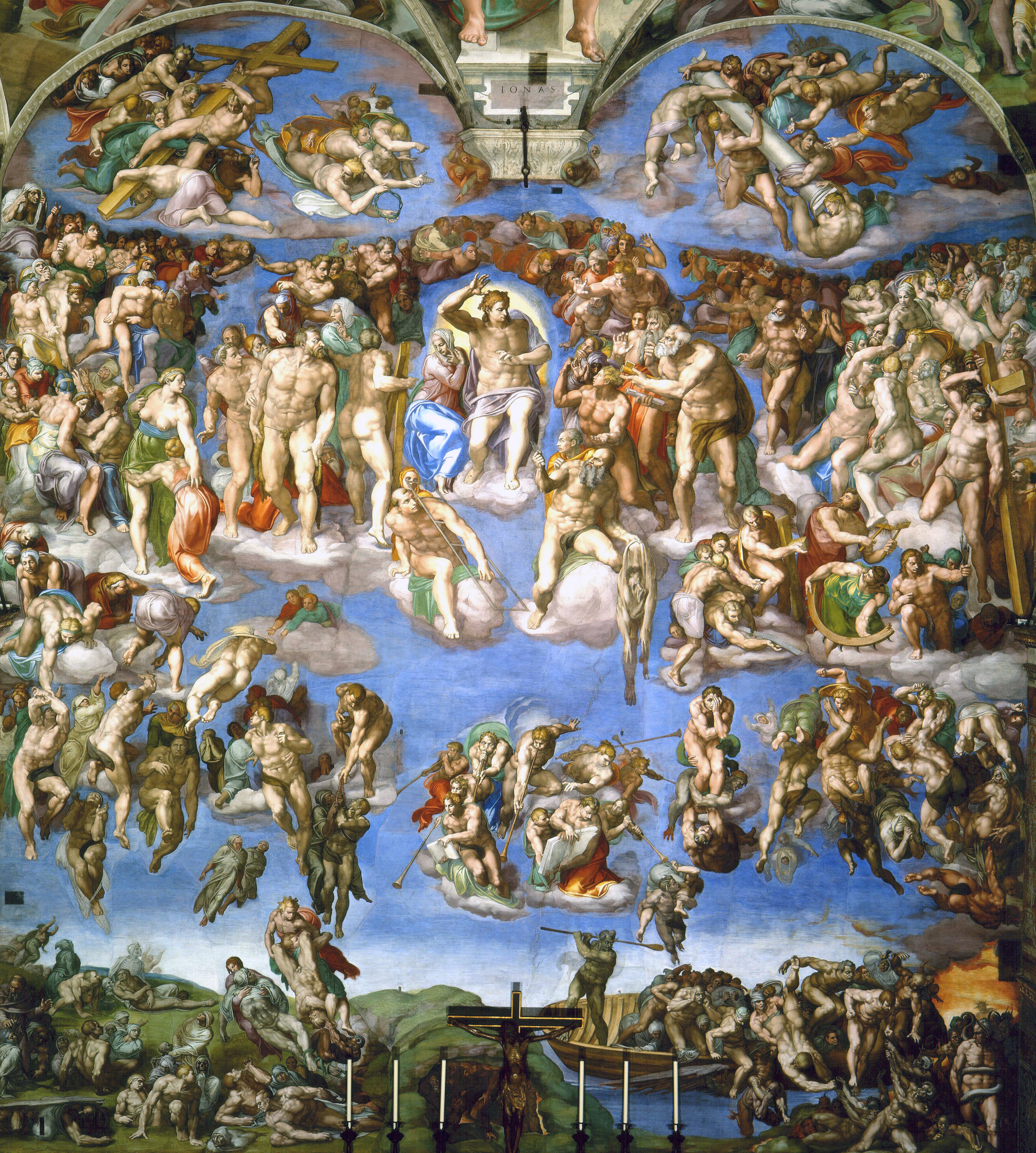
The Last Judgment (1534–1541)

In Rome, Michelangelo lived near the church of Santa Maria di Loreto. It was at this time that he met the poet Vittoria Colonna, marchioness of Pescara, who was to become one of his closest friends until her death in 1547.

Shortly before his death in 1534, Pope Clement VII commissioned Michelangelo to paint a fresco of The Last Judgment on the altar wall of the Sistine Chapel. His successor, Pope Paul III, was instrumental in seeing that Michelangelo began and completed the project, which he laboured on from 1534 to October 1541. The fresco depicts the Second Coming of Christ and his Judgement of the souls. Michelangelo ignored the usual artistic conventions in portraying Jesus, showing him as a massive, muscular figure, youthful, beardless and naked. He is surrounded by saints, among whom Saint Bartholomew holds a drooping flayed skin, bearing the likeness of Michelangelo. The dead rise from their graves, to be consigned either to Heaven or to Hell.

Once completed, the depiction of Christ and the Virgin Mary naked was considered sacrilegious, and Cardinal Carafa and Monsignor Sernini (Mantua's ambassador) campaigned to have the fresco removed or censored, but the Pope resisted. At the Council of Trent, shortly before Michelangelo's death in 1564, it was decided to obscure the genitals and Daniele da Volterra, an apprentice of Michelangelo, was commissioned to make the alterations. An uncensored copy of the original, by Marcello Venusti, is in the Capodimonte Museum of Naples.

Michelangelo worked on a number of architectural projects at this time. They included a design for the Capitoline Hill with its trapezoid piazza displaying the ancient bronze statue of Marcus Aurelius. He designed the upper floor of the Palazzo Farnese and the interior of the Church of Santa Maria degli Angeli, in which he transformed the vaulted interior of an Ancient Roman bathhouse. Other architectural works include San Giovanni dei Fiorentini, the Sforza Chapel (Capella Sforza) in the Basilica di Santa Maria Maggiore and the Porta Pia.

=== St Peter's Basilica, 1546–1564 ===
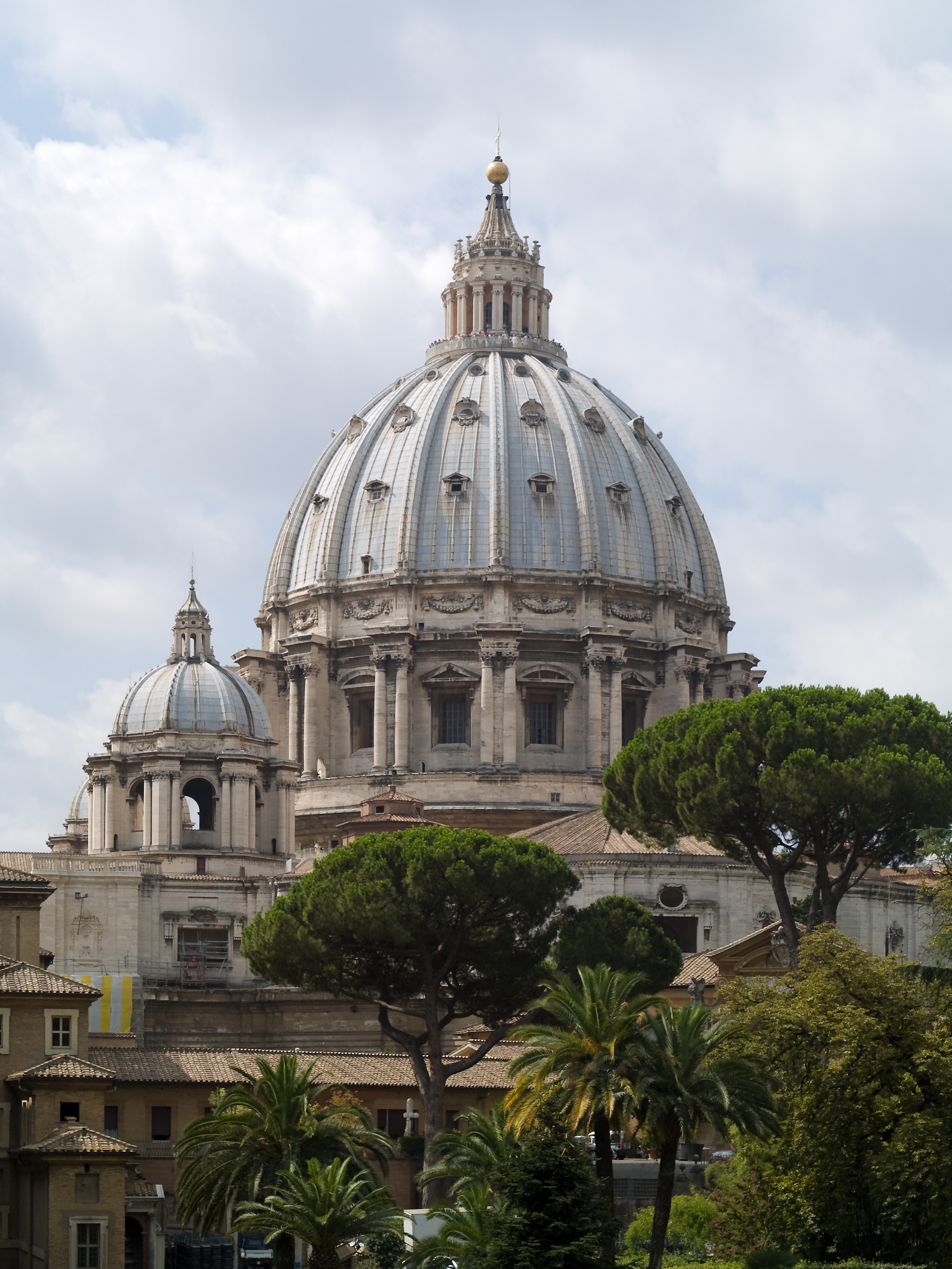
The dome of St Peter's Basilica

While still working on the Last Judgment, Michelangelo received yet another commission for the Vatican. This was for the painting of two large frescos in the Cappella Paolina depicting significant events in the lives of the two most important saints of Rome, the Conversion of Saint Paul and the Crucifixion of Saint Peter. Like the Last Judgment, these two works are complex compositions containing a great number of figures. They were completed in 1550. In the same year, Giorgio Vasari published his Vita, including a biography of Michelangelo.

In 1546, Michelangelo was appointed architect of St. Peter's Basilica, Rome. The process of replacing the Constantinian basilica of the 4th century had been underway for fifty years and in 1506 foundations had been laid to the plans of Bramante. Successive architects had worked on it, but little progress had been made. Michelangelo was persuaded to take over the project. He returned to the concepts of Bramante, and developed his ideas for a centrally planned church, strengthening the structure both physically and visually. The dome, not completed until after his death, has been called by Banister Fletcher, "the greatest creation of the Renaissance".

As construction was progressing on St Peter's, there was concern that Michelangelo would die before the dome was finished. However, once building commenced on the lower part of the dome, the supporting ring, the completion of the design was inevitable. (Note: On 7 December 2007, a red chalk sketch for the dome of St Peter's Basilica, possibly the last made by Michelangelo before his death, was discovered in the Vatican archives. It is extremely rare, since he destroyed his designs later in life. The sketch is a partial plan for one of the radial columns of the cupola drum of St Peter's.)

== Personal life ==
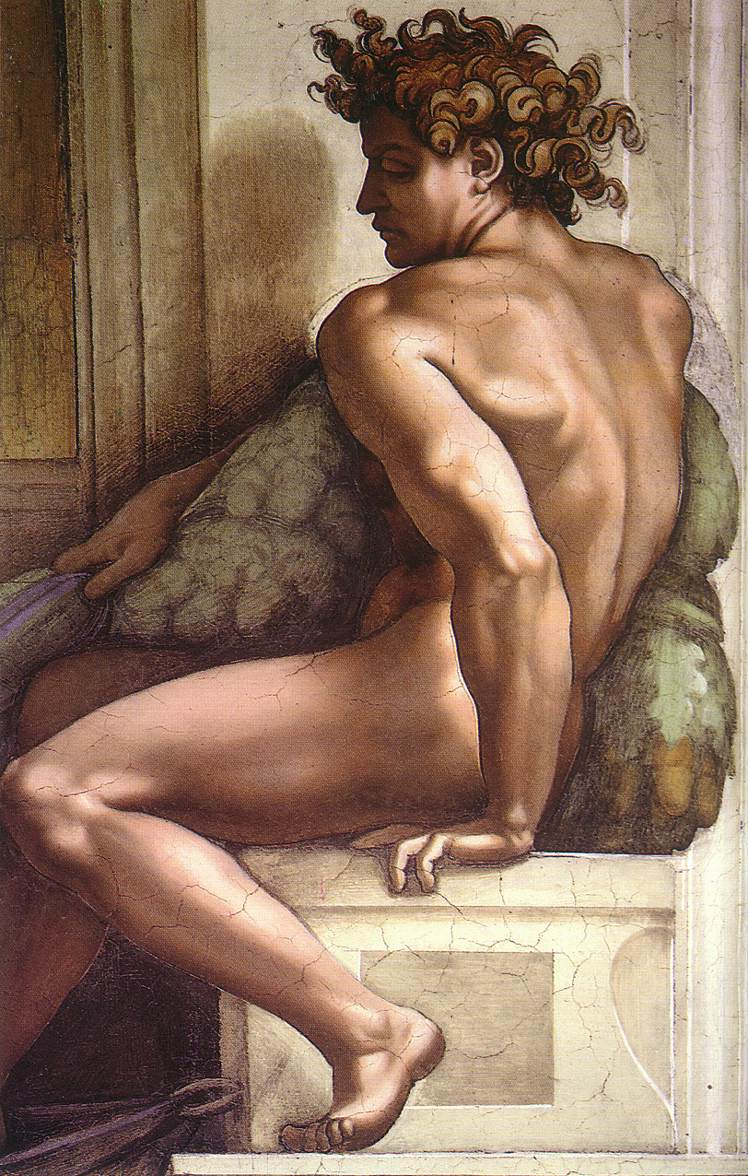
Ignudo fresco from 1509 on the Sistine Chapel ceiling

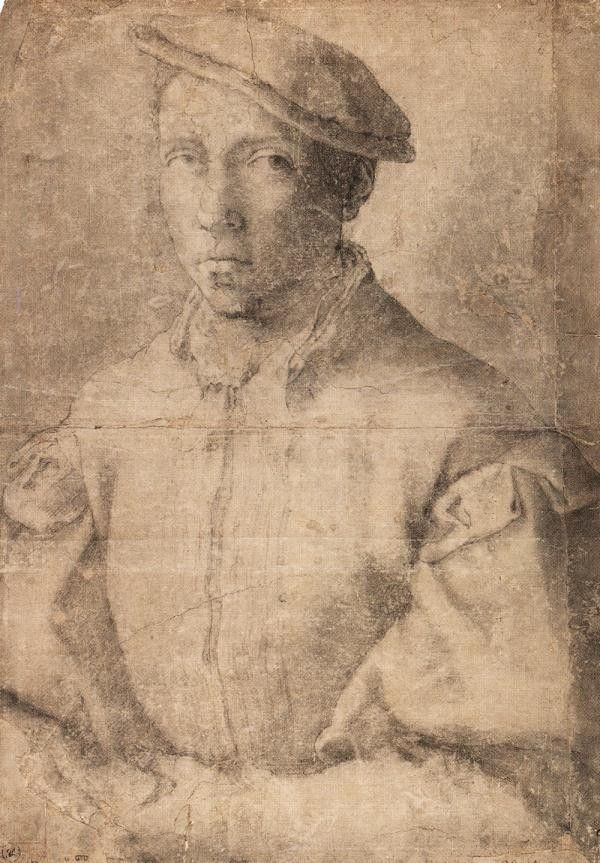
Speculation exists that this might be a drawing by Michelangelo portraying Tommaso dei Cavalieri.

=== Faith ===
Michelangelo was a devout Catholic whose faith deepened at the end of his life. Along with Raphael, he was enrolled in the Secular Franciscan Order.

His poetry includes the following closing lines from what is known as poem 285 (written in 1554): "Neither painting nor sculpture will be able any longer to calm my soul, now turned toward that divine love that opened his arms on the cross to take us in."

=== Personal habits ===
Michelangelo was moderate in his personal life, and once told his apprentice, Ascanio Condivi: "However rich I may have been, I have always lived like a poor man." Michelangelo's bank accounts and numerous deeds of purchase show that his net worth was about 50,000 gold ducats, more than many princes and dukes of his time. Condivi said he was indifferent to food and drink, eating "more out of necessity than of pleasure" and that he "often slept in his clothes and ... boots." His biographer Paolo Giovio says, "His nature was so rough and uncouth that his domestic habits were incredibly squalid, and deprived posterity of any pupils who might have followed him." This, however, may not have affected him, as he was by nature a solitary and melancholy person, bizzarro e fantastico, a man who "withdrew himself from the company of men."

=== Relationships and poetry ===
Love for a lady's different. Not much
in that for a wise and virile lover's trouble.

— translation of a Michelangelo poem by John Frederick Nim

Michelangelo wrote more than three hundred sonnets and madrigals. About sixty are addressed to men – "the first significant modern corpus of love poetry from one man to another".

The longest sequence, displaying deep loving feeling, was written to the young Roman patrician Tommaso dei Cavalieri (c. 1509–1587), who was 23 years old when Michelangelo first met him in 1532, at the age of 57. In his Lives of the Artists, Vasari observed: "But infinitely more than any of the others he loved M. Tommaso de' Cavalieri, a Roman gentleman, for whom, being a young man and much inclined to these arts, [Michelangelo] made, to the end that he might learn to draw, many most superb drawings of divinely beautiful heads, designed in black and red chalk; and then he drew for him a Ganymede rapt to Heaven by Jove's Eagle, a Tityus with the Vulture devouring his heart, the Chariot of the Sun falling with Phaëthon into the Po, and a Bacchanal of children, which are all in themselves most rare things, and drawings the like of which have never been seen." Some scholars downplay the relationship between Michelangelo and Cavalieri as one of platonic friendship. The poems to Cavalieri make up the first large sequence of poems in any modern tongue addressed by one man to another; they predate by 50 years Shakespeare's sonnets to the fair youth:

I feel as lit by fire a cold countenance
That burns me from afar and keeps itself ice-chill;
A strength I feel two shapely arms to fill
Which without motion moves every balance.

— translation of a Michelangelo poem by Michael Sullivan

Cavalieri replied: "I swear to return your love. Never have I loved a man more than I love you, never have I wished for a friendship more than I wish for yours." Cavalieri remained devoted to Michelangelo until the latter's death.

In 1542, Michelangelo met Cecchino dei Bracci who died only a year later, inspiring Michelangelo to write 48 funeral epigrams. Some of the objects of Michelangelo's affections, and subjects of his poetry, took advantage of him: the model Febo di Poggio asked for money in response to a love-poem, and a second model, Gherardo Perini, shamelessly stole from him.

The nature of the poetry has been a source of discomfort to later generations. Michelangelo's grandnephew, Michelangelo Buonarroti the Younger, published the poems in 1623 with the gender of pronouns changed; he also removed words or in other instances insisted that Michelangelo's poems be read allegorically and philosophically, a judgment some modern scholars still repeat today. Anthony Hughes, for example, says that it is impossible to know whether Michelangelo was sexually active and, while acknowledging that it is a reasonable guess that Michelangelo's sexuality was inclined towards men rather than women, insists the letters and poems Michelangelo addressed to Cavalieri cannot be taken as expressions of personal desire, and should be understood in the context of the realities of Italian Renaissance culture.

But since John Addington Symonds translated the poems into English in 1893, restoring the original genders, it has become more accepted that Michelangelo's poems should be understood at face value, that is, as indicating his personal feelings and a preference for young men.

Late in life, Michelangelo nurtured a friendship with the poet and noble widow Vittoria Colonna, whom he met in Rome in 1536 or 1538 and who was in her late forties at the time. They wrote sonnets for each other and were in regular contact until she died. These sonnets mostly deal with the spiritual issues that occupied them. Condivi, who in his biography was preoccupied with downplaying Michelangelo's attraction to men, alleged Michelangelo said his sole regret in life was that he did not kiss the widow's face in the same manner that he had her hand.

=== Feuds with other artists ===
In a letter from late 1542, Michelangelo blamed the tensions between Julius II and him on the envy of Bramante and Raphael, saying of the latter, "all he had in art, he got from me". According to Gian Paolo Lomazzo, Michelangelo and Raphael met once: the former was alone, while the latter was accompanied by several others. Michelangelo commented that he thought he had encountered the chief of police with such an assemblage, and Raphael replied that he thought he had met an executioner, as they are wont to walk alone.

== Works ==
=== Madonna and Child ===
The Madonna of the Stairs is Michelangelo's earliest known work in marble. It is carved in shallow relief, a technique often employed by the master-sculptor of the early 15th century, Donatello, and others such as Desiderio da Settignano. While the Madonna is in profile, the easiest aspect for a shallow relief, the child displays a twisting motion that was to become characteristic of Michelangelo's work. The Taddei Tondo of 1502 shows the Christ Child frightened by a Bullfinch, a symbol of the Crucifixion. The lively form of the child was later adapted by Raphael in the Bridgewater Madonna. The Madonna of Bruges was, at the time of its creation, unlike other such statues depicting the Virgin proudly presenting her son. Here, the Christ Child, restrained by his mother's clasping hand, is about to step off into the world. The Doni Tondo, depicting the Holy Family, has elements of all three previous works: the frieze of figures in the background has the appearance of a low-relief, while the circular shape and dynamic forms echo the Taddeo Tondo. The twisting motion present in the Madonna of Bruges is accentuated in the painting. The painting heralds the forms, movement and colour that Michelangelo was to employ on the ceiling of the Sistine Chapel.

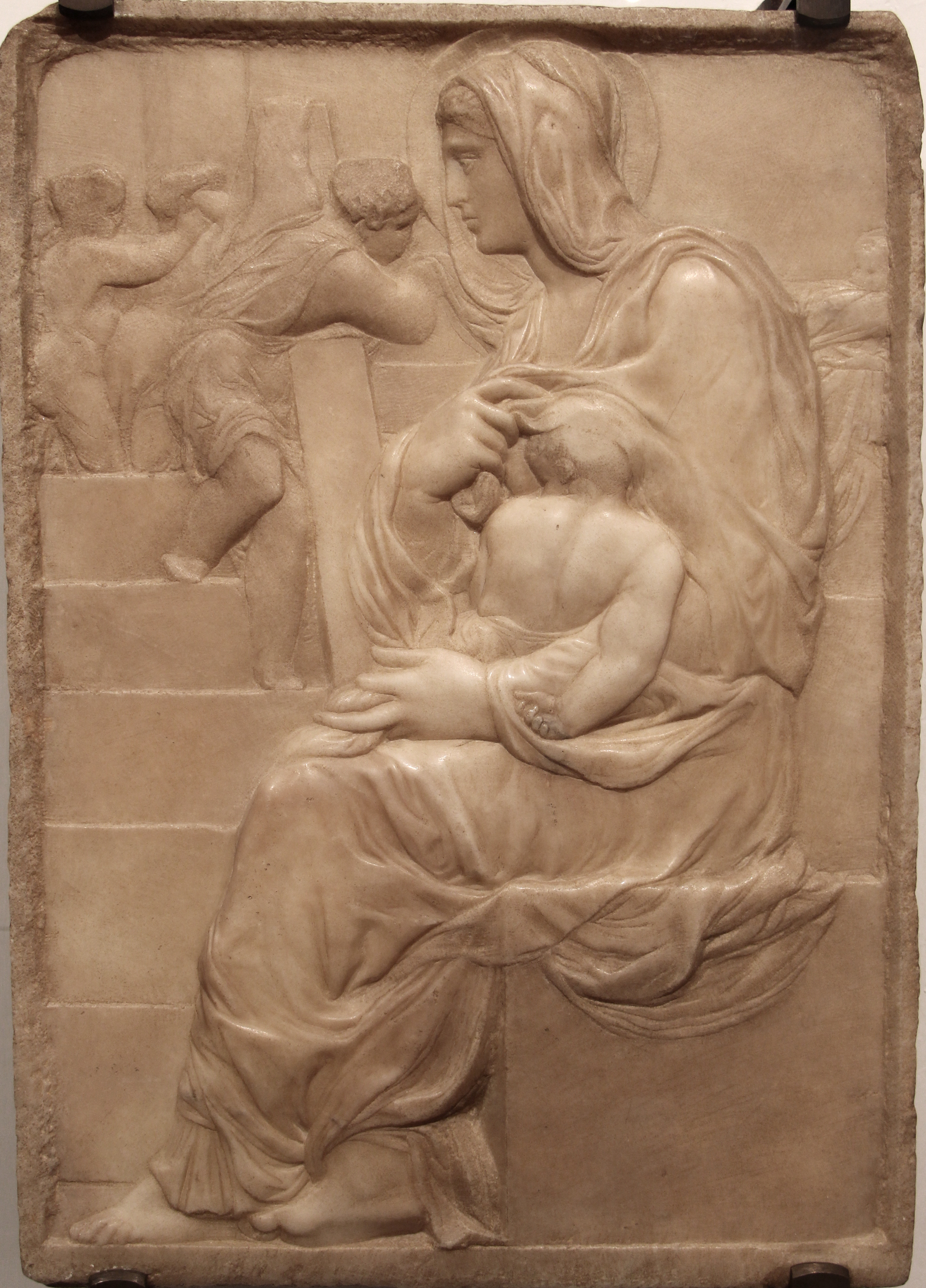
The Madonna of the Stairs (1490–1492)

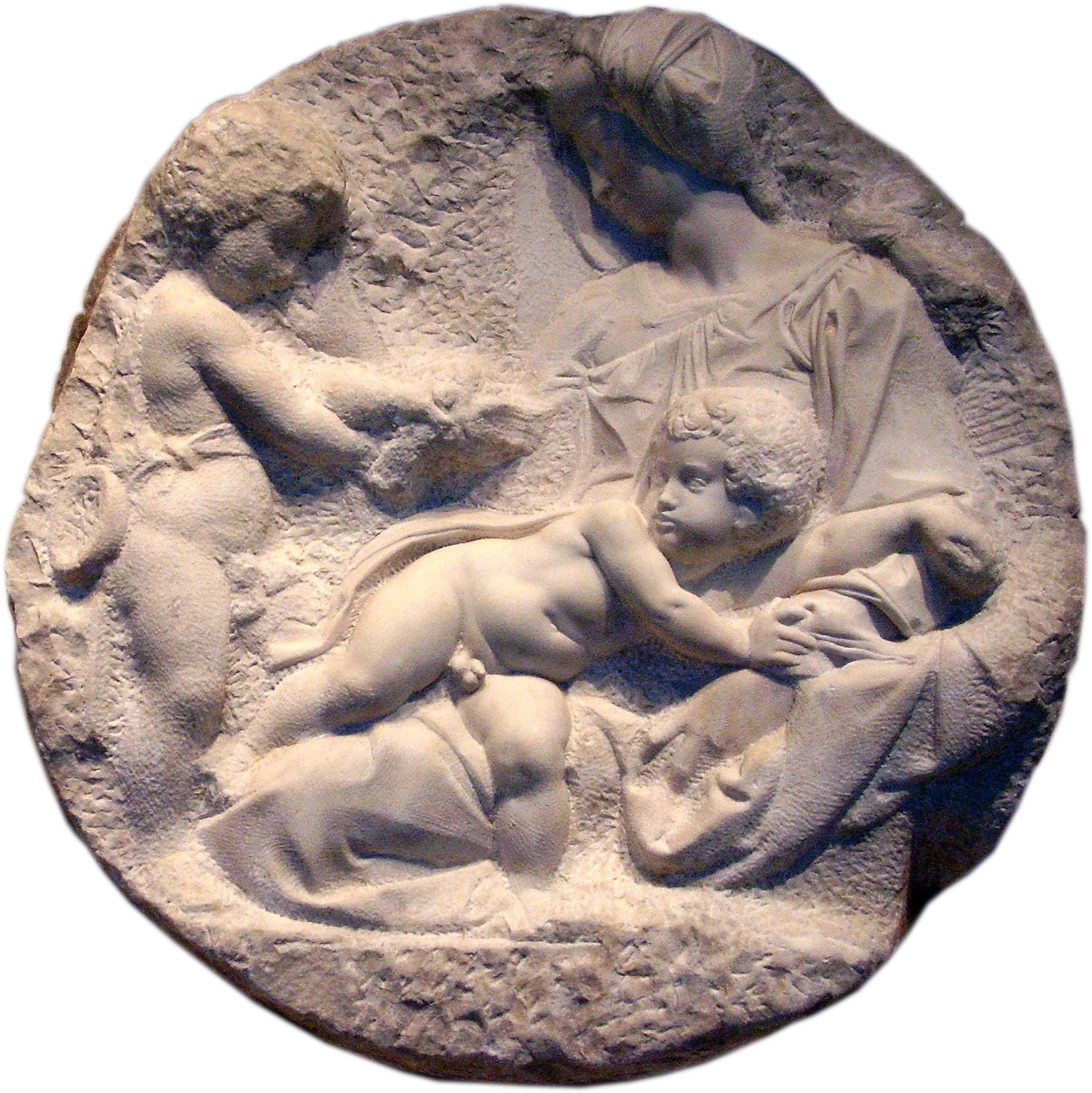
The Taddei Tondo (1502)

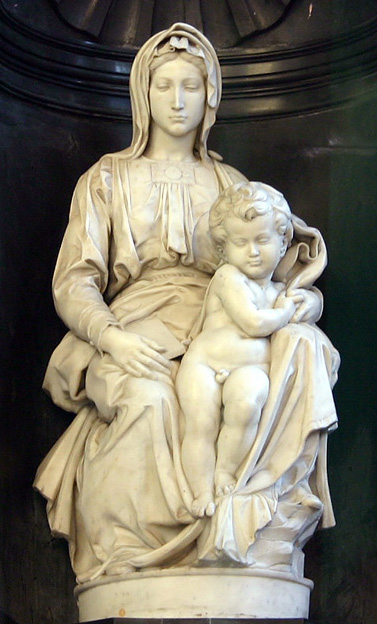
Madonna of Bruges (1504)

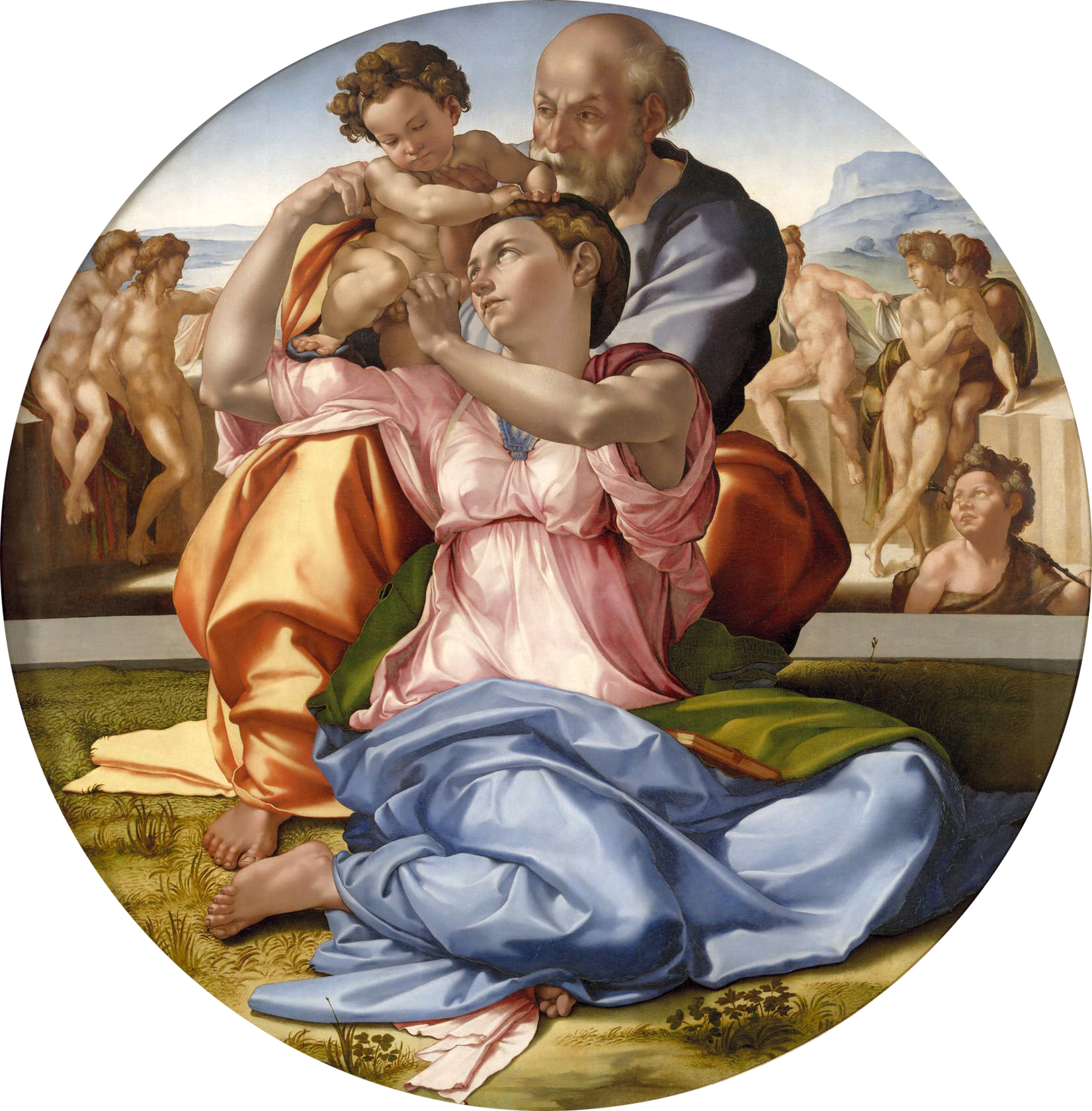
The Doni Tondo (1504–1506)

=== Male figure ===
The kneeling Angel is an early work, one of several that Michelangelo created as part of a large decorative scheme for the Arca di San Domenico in the church dedicated to that saint in Bologna. Several other artists had worked on the scheme, beginning with Nicola Pisano in the 13th century. In the late 15th century, the project was managed by Niccolò dell'Arca. An angel holding a candlestick, by Niccolò, was already in place. Although the two angels form a pair, there is a great contrast between the two works, the one depicting a delicate child with flowing hair clothed in Gothic robes with deep folds, and Michelangelo's depicting a robust and muscular youth with eagle's wings, clad in a garment of Classical style. Everything about Michelangelo's Angel is dynamic. Michelangelo's Bacchus was a commission with a specified subject, the youthful God of Wine. The sculpture has all the traditional attributes, a vine wreath, a cup of wine and a fawn, but Michelangelo ingested an air of reality into the subject, depicting him with bleary eyes, a swollen bladder and a stance that suggests he is unsteady on his feet. While the work is plainly inspired by Classical sculpture, it is innovative for its rotating movement and strongly three-dimensional quality, which encourages the viewer to look at it from every angle.

In the so-called Dying Slave, Michelangelo again utilised the figure with marked contrapposto to suggest a particular human state, in this case waking from sleep. With the Rebellious Slave, it is one of two such earlier figures for the Tomb of Pope Julius II, now in the Louvre, that the sculptor brought to an almost finished state. These two works were to have a profound influence on later sculpture, through Rodin who studied them at the Louvre. The Atlas Slave is one of the later figures for Pope Julius' tomb. The works, known collectively as The Captives, each show the figure struggling to free itself, as if from the bonds of the rock in which it is lodged. The works give a unique insight into the sculptural methods that Michelangelo employed and his way of revealing what he perceived within the rock.

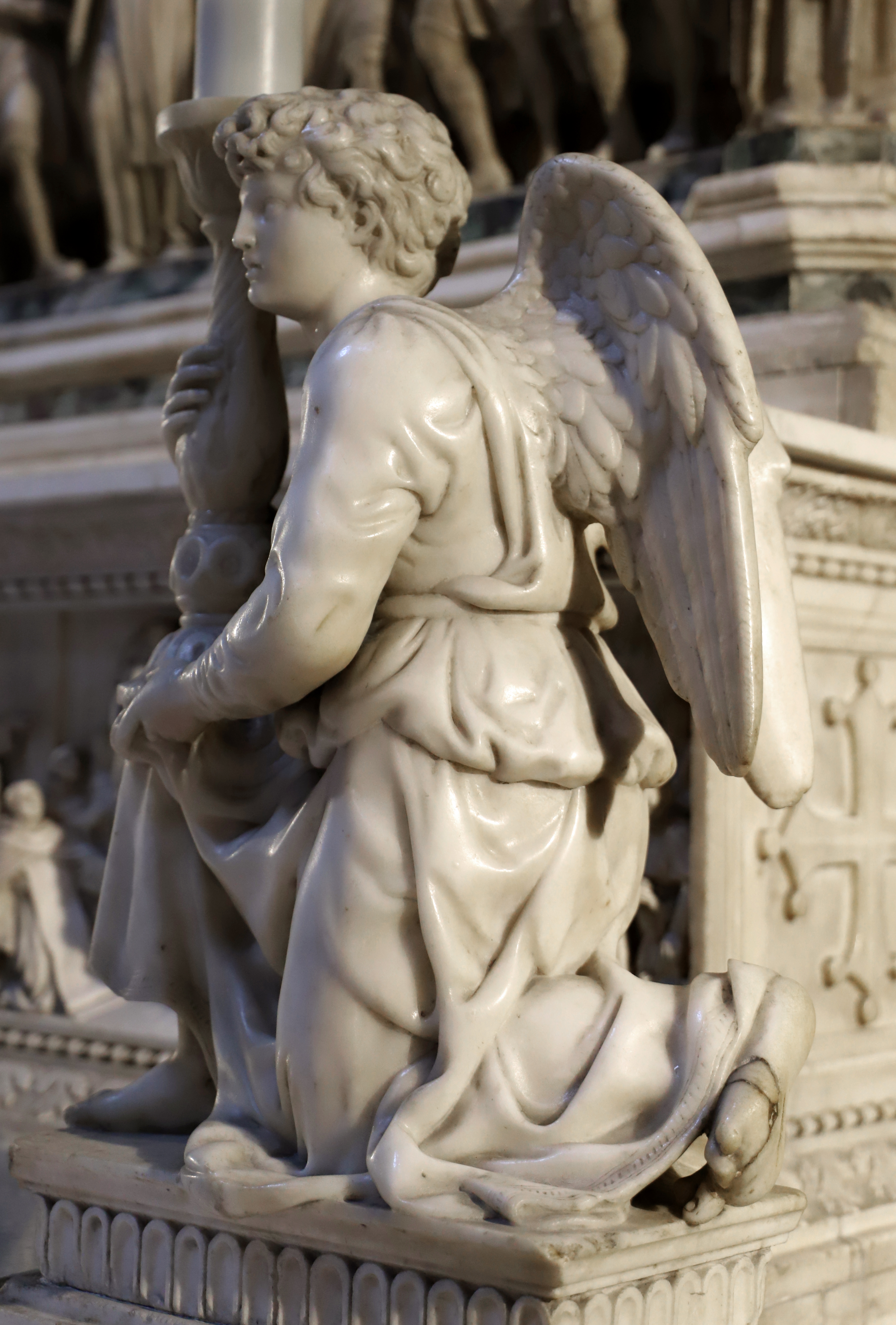
Angel by Michelangelo, early work (1494–95)

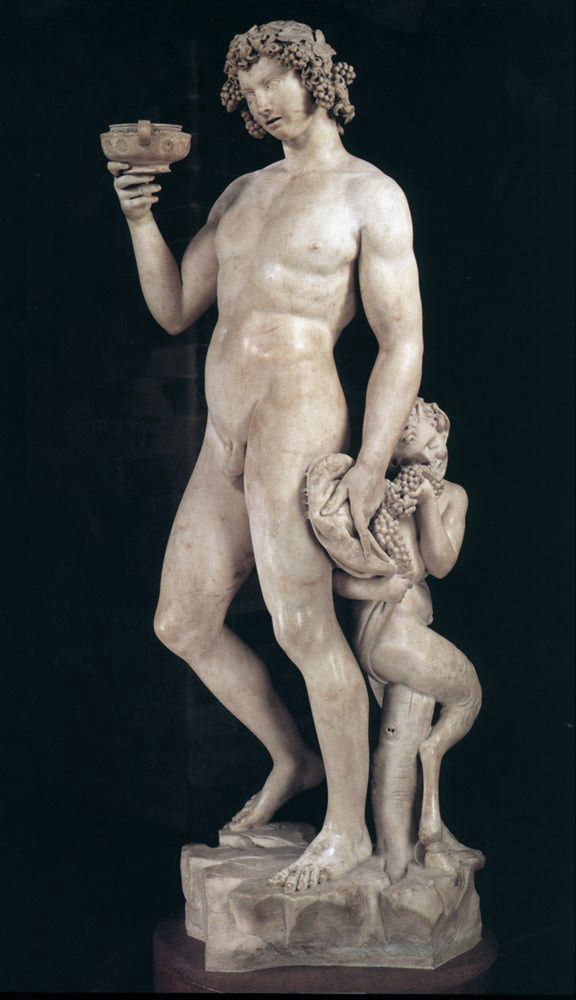
Bacchus by Michelangelo, early work (1496–1497)

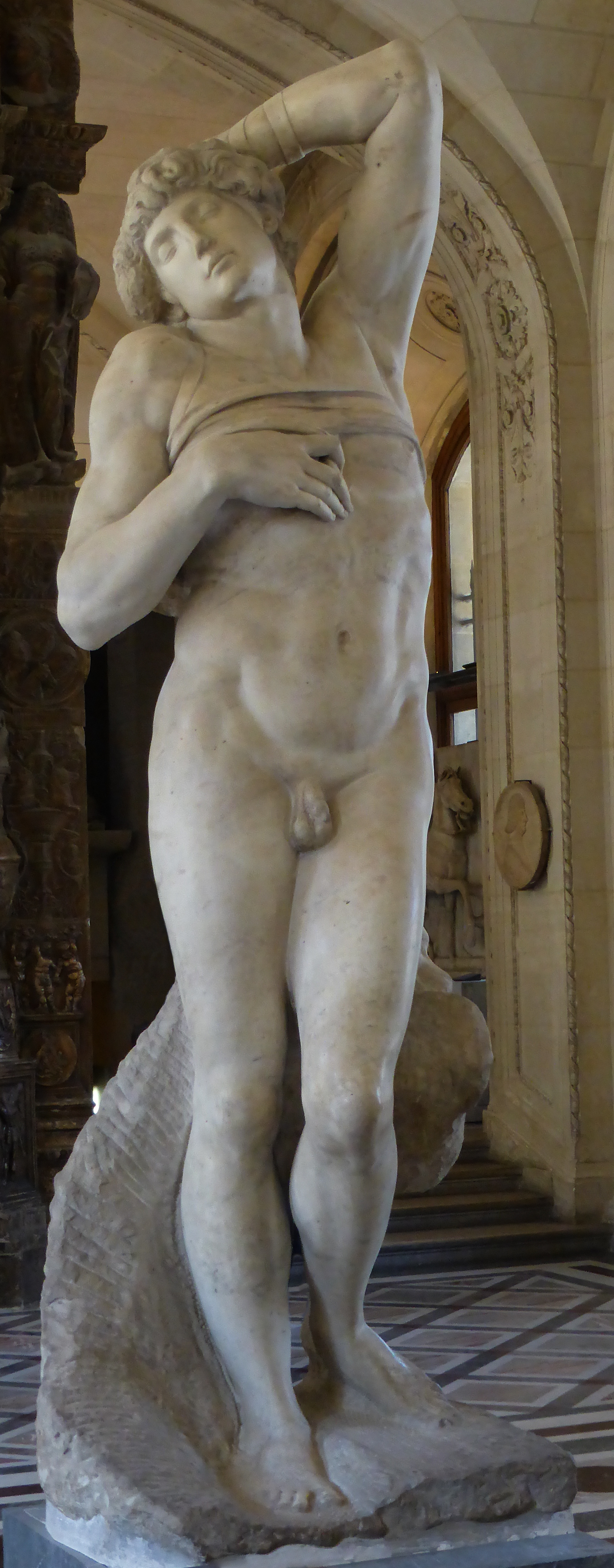
Dying Slave, Louvre (1513)

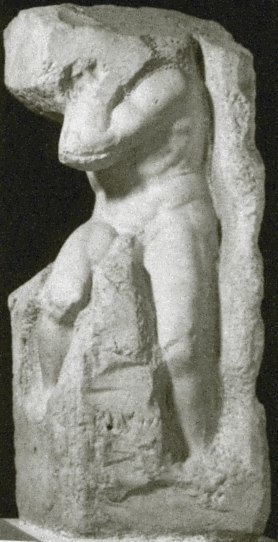
Atlas Slave (1530–1534)

=== Sistine Chapel ceiling ===
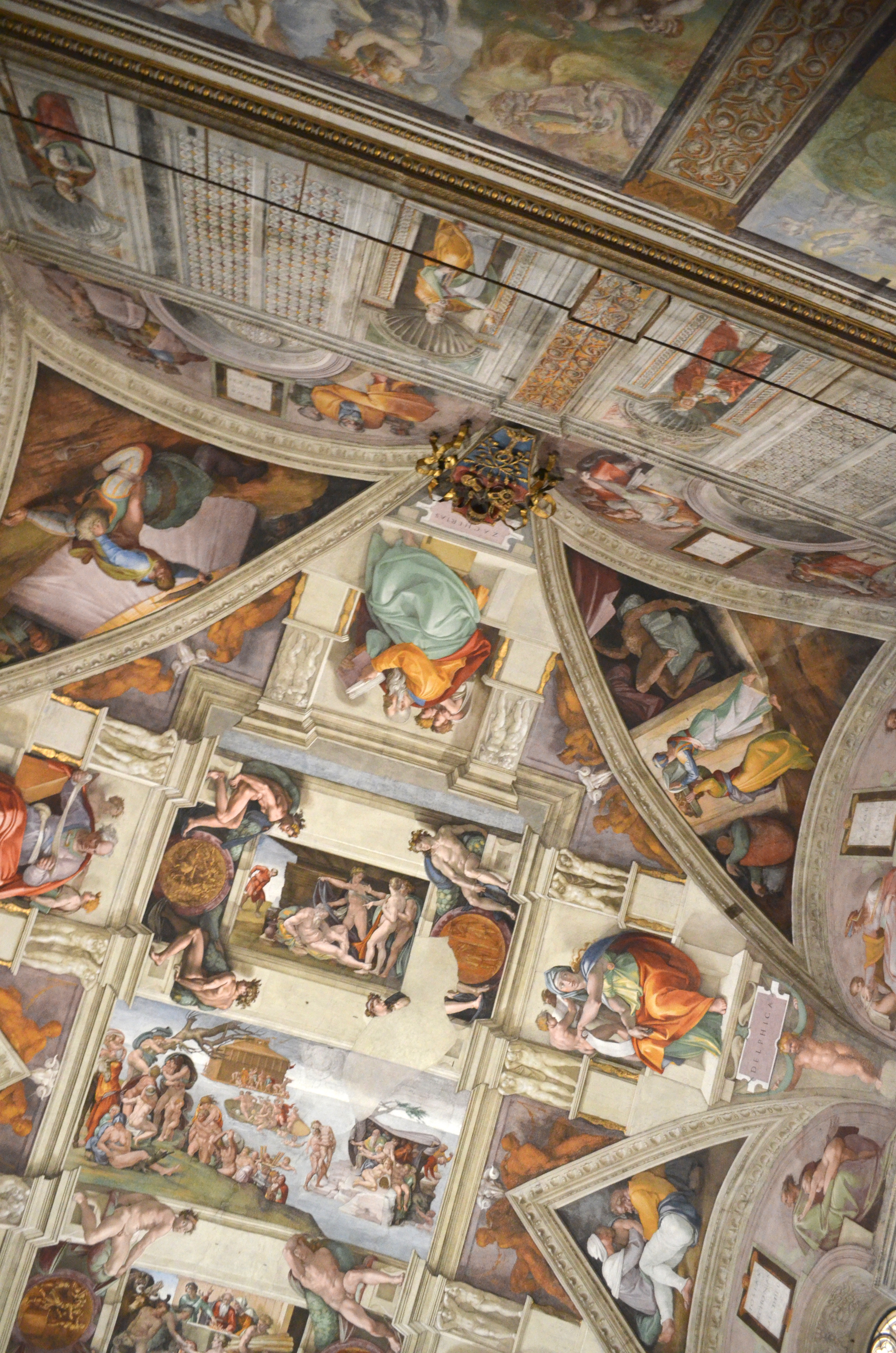
The west end of the Sistine Chapel ceiling

The Sistine Chapel ceiling was painted between 1508 and 1512. The ceiling is a flattened barrel vault supported on twelve triangular pendentives that rise from between the windows of the chapel. The commission, as envisaged by Julius II, was to adorn the pendentives with figures of the twelve apostles. Michelangelo, who was reluctant to take the job, persuaded the Pope to give him a free hand in the composition. The resultant scheme of decoration awed his contemporaries and has inspired other artists ever since. The scheme is of nine panels illustrating episodes from the Book of Genesis, set in an architectonic frame. On the pendentives, Michelangelo replaced the proposed Apostles with Prophets and Sibyls who heralded the coming of the Messiah.

Michelangelo began painting with the later episodes in the narrative, the pictures including locational details and groups of figures, the Drunkenness of Noah being the first of this group. In the later compositions, painted after the initial scaffolding had been removed, Michelangelo made the figures larger. One of the central images, The Creation of Adam is one of the best known and most reproduced works in the history of art. The final panel, showing the Separation of Light from Darkness is the broadest in style and was painted in a single day. As the model for the Creator, Michelangelo has depicted himself in the action of painting the ceiling.

As supporters to the smaller scenes, Michelangelo painted twenty youths who have variously been interpreted as angels, as muses, or simply as decoration. Michelangelo referred to them as "ignudi". The figure reproduced may be seen in context in the above image of the Separation of Light from Darkness. In the process of painting the ceiling, Michelangelo made studies for different figures, of which some, such as that for The Libyan Sibyl have survived, demonstrating the care taken by Michelangelo in details such as the hands and feet. The prophet Jeremiah, contemplating the downfall of Jerusalem, is a self-portrait.

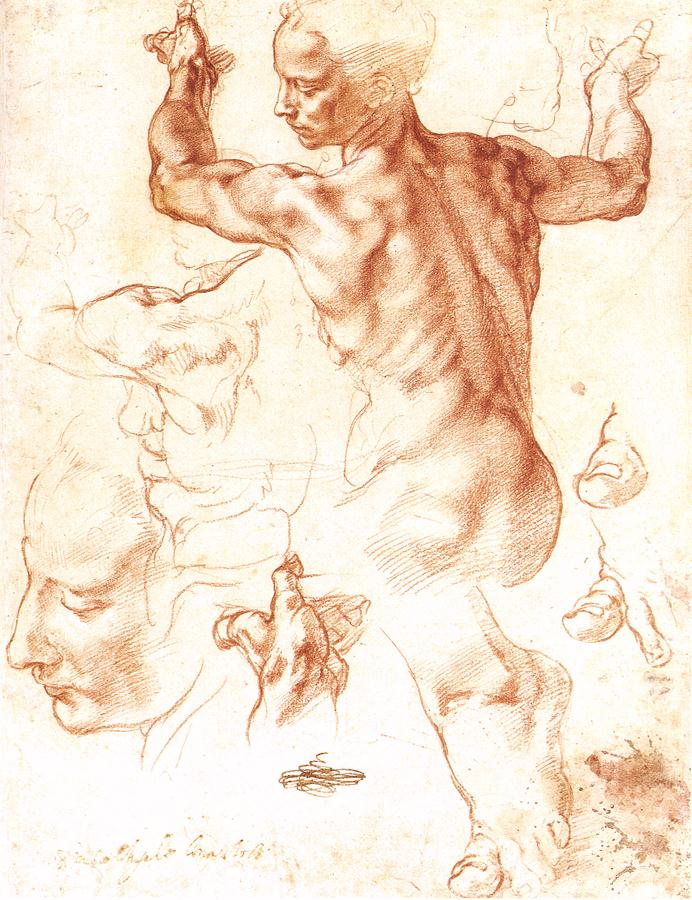
Studies for The Libyan Sibyl

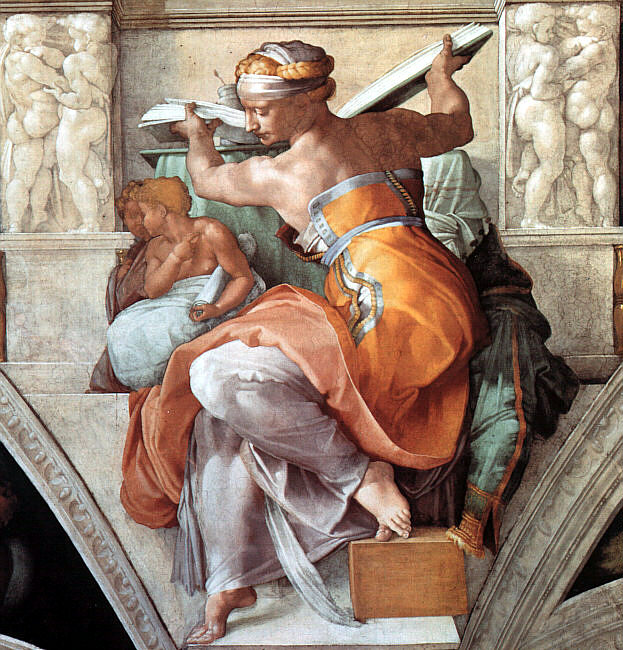
The Libyan Sibyl (1511)

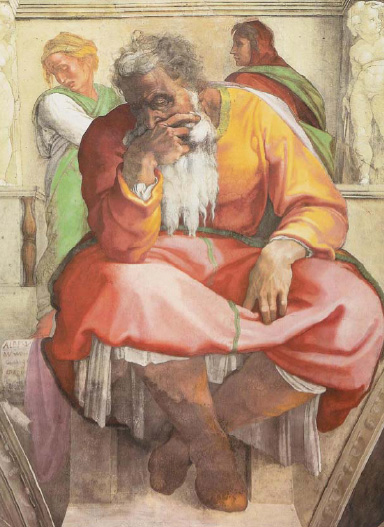
The Prophet Jeremiah (1511)

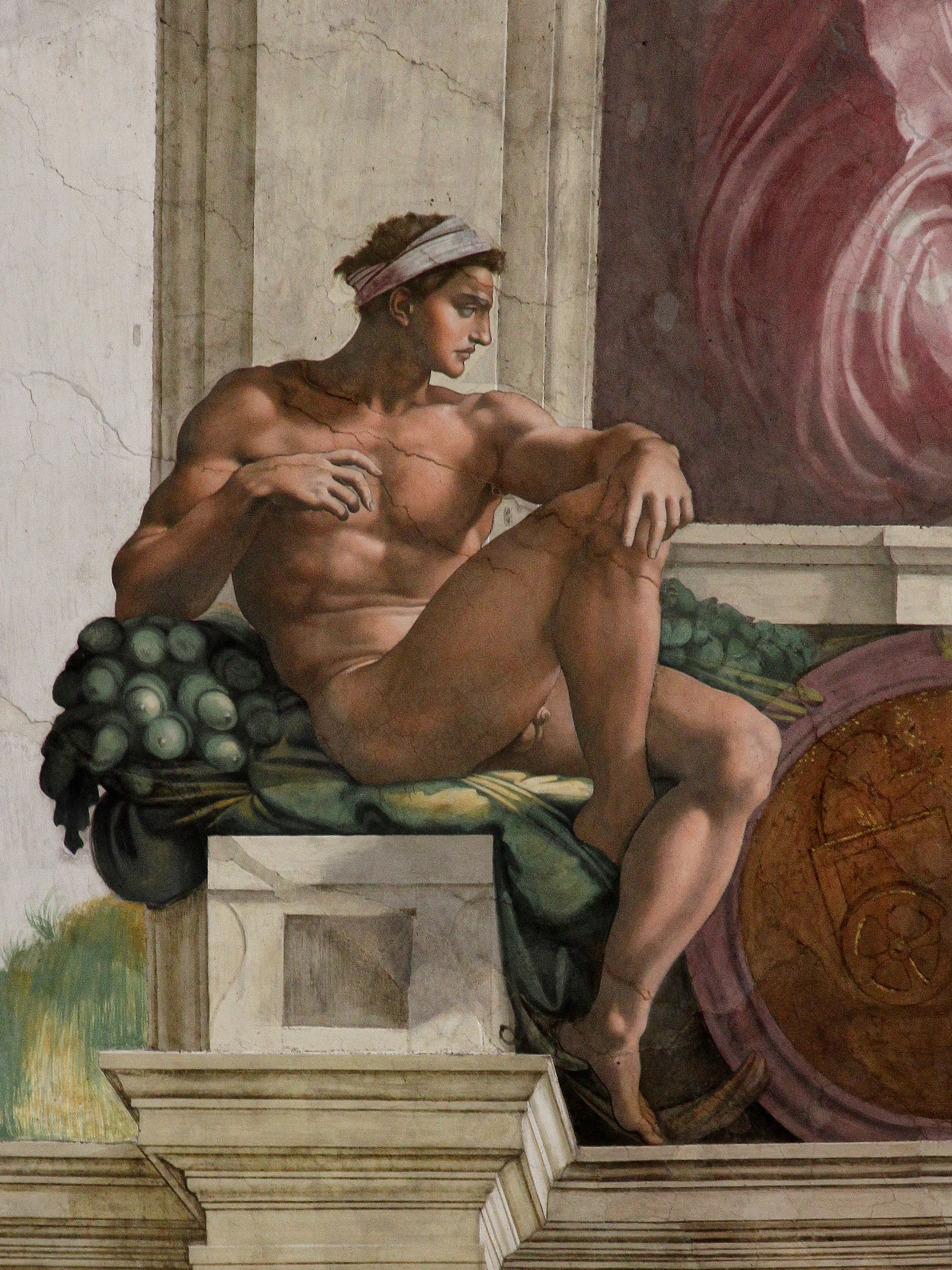
Ignudo

=== Figure compositions ===
Michelangelo's relief of the Battle of the Centaurs, created while he was still a youth associated with the Medici Academy, is an unusually complex relief in that it shows a great number of figures involved in a vigorous struggle. Such a complex disarray of figures was rare in Florentine art, where it would usually only be found in images showing either the Massacre of the Innocents or the Torments of Hell. The relief treatment, in which some of the figures are boldly projecting, may indicate Michelangelo's familiarity with Roman sarcophagus reliefs from the collection of Lorenzo Medici, and similar marble panels created by Nicola and Giovanni Pisano, and with the figurative compositions on Ghiberti's Baptistry Doors.

The composition of the Battle of Cascina is known in its entirety only from copies, as the original cartoon, according to Vasari, was so admired that it deteriorated and was eventually in pieces. It reflects the earlier relief in the energy and diversity of the figures, with many different postures, and many being viewed from the back, as they turn towards the approaching enemy and prepare for battle.

In The Last Judgment it is said that Michelangelo drew inspiration from a fresco by Melozzo da Forlì in Rome's Santi Apostoli. Melozzo had depicted figures from different angles, as if they were floating in the Heaven and seen from below. Melozzo's majestic figure of Christ, with windblown cloak, demonstrates a degree of foreshortening of the figure that had also been employed by Andrea Mantegna, but was not usual in the frescos of Florentine painters. In The Last Judgment Michelangelo had the opportunity to depict, on an unprecedented scale, figures in the action of either rising heavenward or falling and being dragged down.

In the two frescos of the Pauline Chapel, The Crucifixion of St. Peter and The Conversion of Saul, Michelangelo has used the various groups of figures to convey a complex narrative. In the Crucifixion of Peter soldiers busy themselves about their assigned duty of digging a post hole and raising the cross while various people look on and discuss the events. A group of horrified women cluster in the foreground, while another group of Christians is led by a tall man to witness the events. In the right foreground, Michelangelo walks out of the painting with an expression of disillusionment.

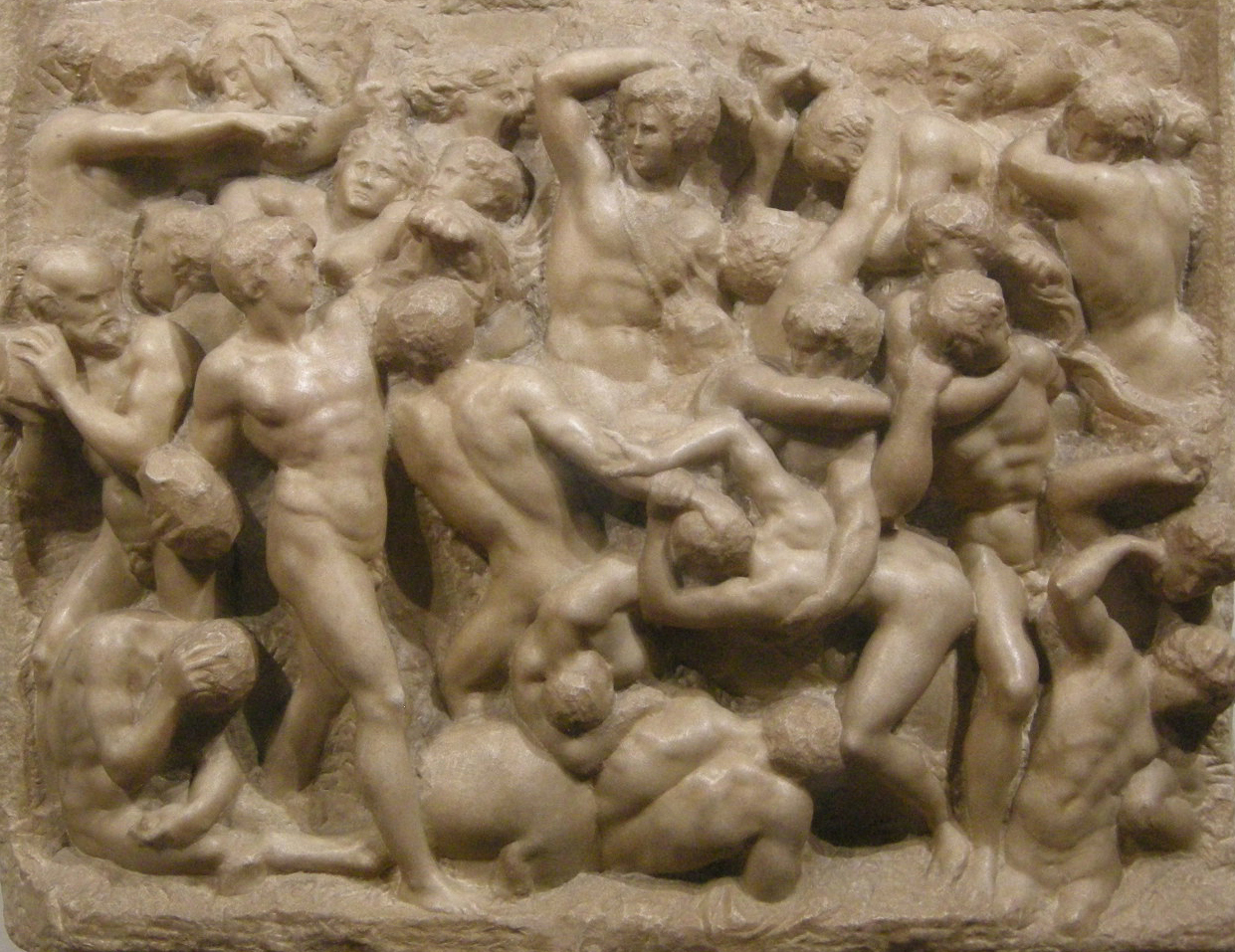
Battle of the Centaurs (1492)

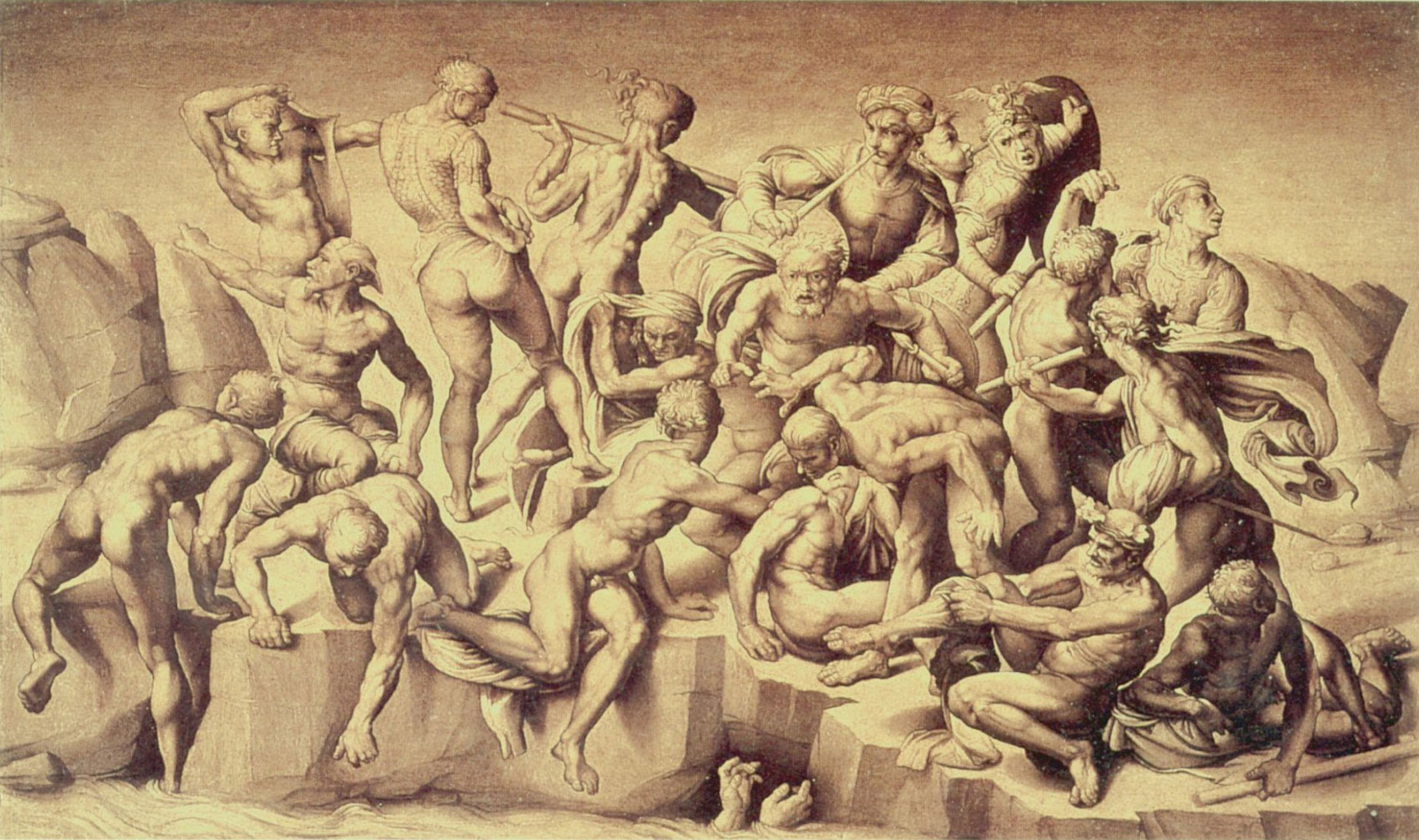
Copy of the lost Battle of Cascina by Bastiano da Sangallo

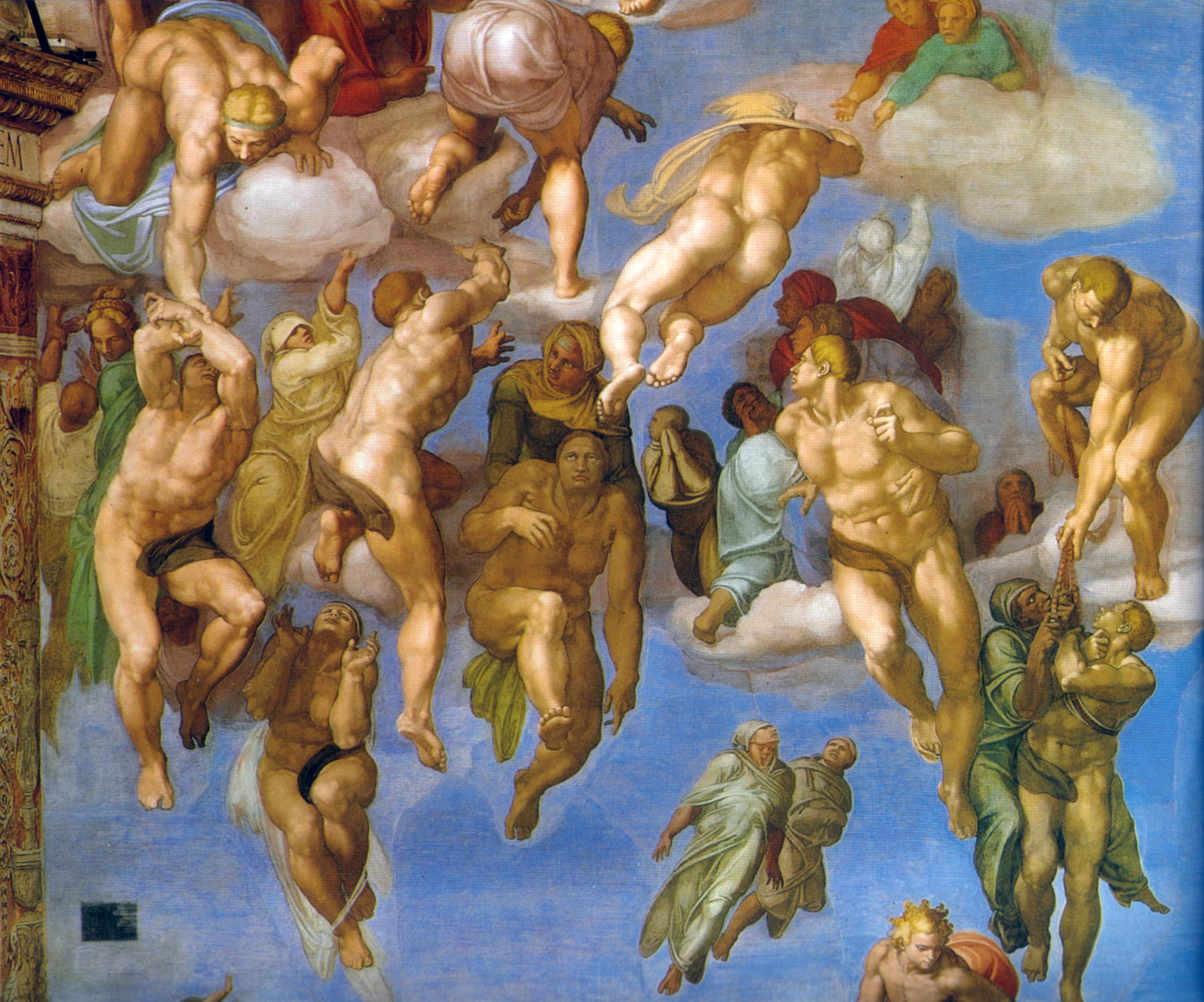
The Last Judgment, detail of the Redeemed (see whole image above)

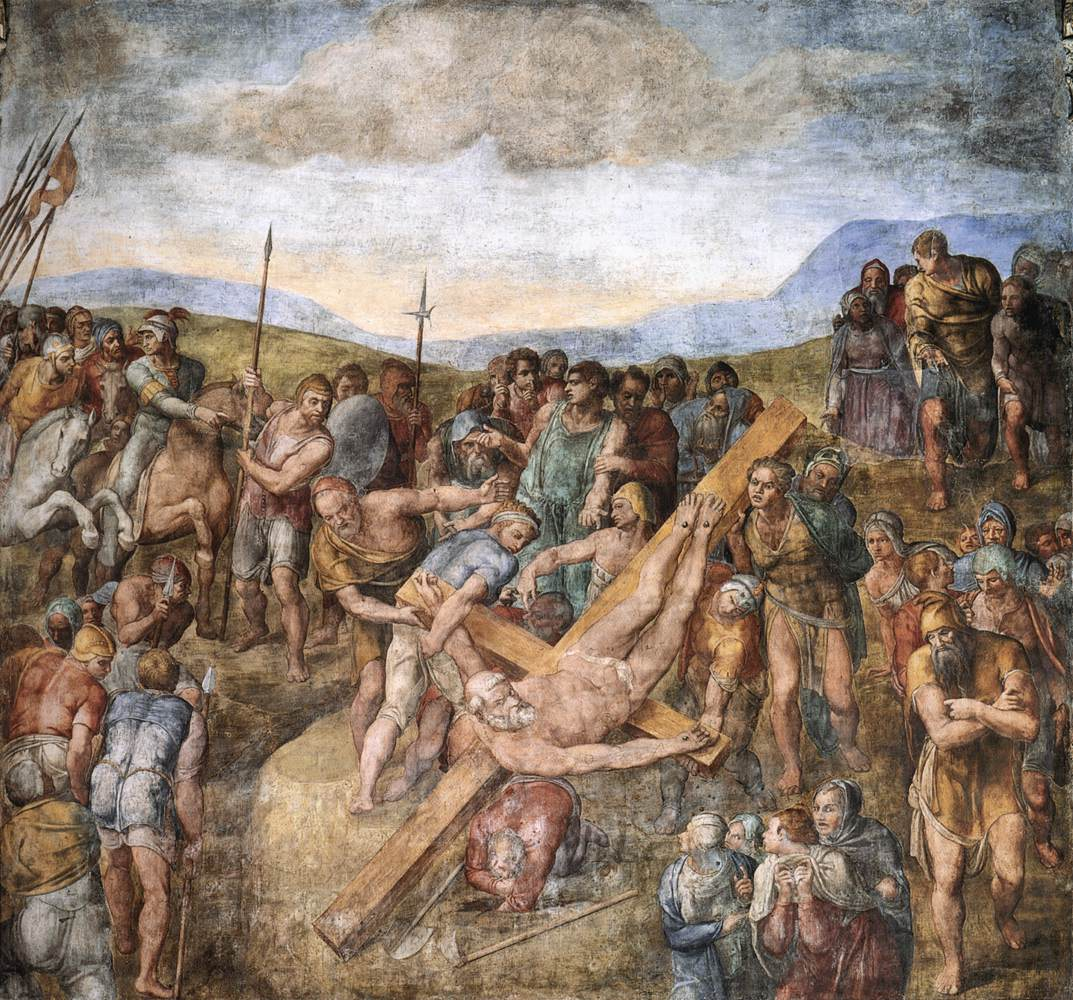
The Crucifixion of St. Peter

=== Architecture ===
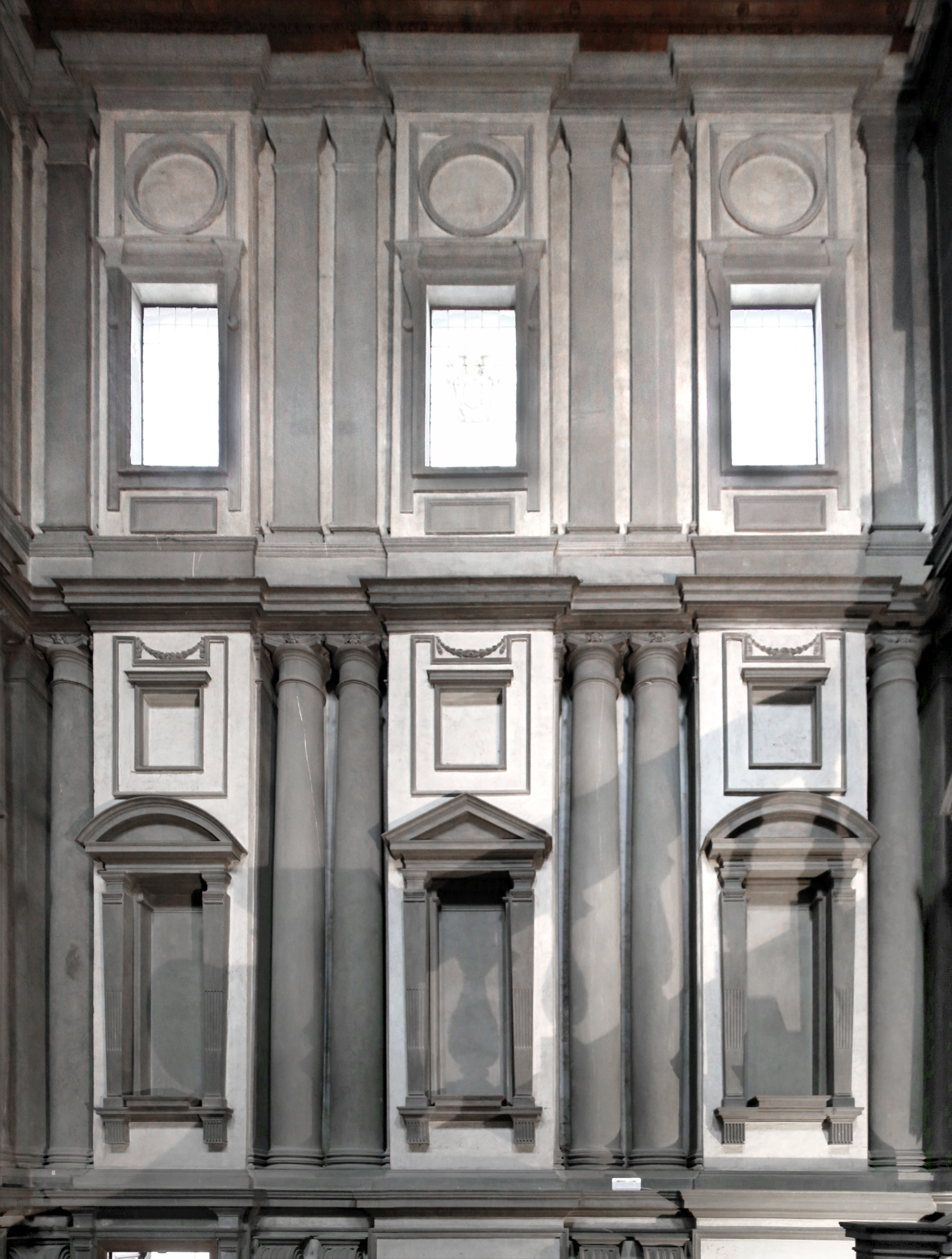
The vestibule of the Laurentian Library in Florence

Michelangelo's architectural commissions included a number that were not realised, notably the façade for Brunelleschi's Church of San Lorenzo in Florence, for which Michelangelo had a wooden model constructed, but which remains to this day unfinished rough brick. At the same church, Giulio de' Medici (later Pope Clement VII) commissioned him to design the Medici Chapel and the tombs of Giuliano and Lorenzo Medici. Pope Clement also commissioned the Laurentian Library, for which Michelangelo also designed the extraordinary vestibule with columns recessed into niches, and a staircase that appears to spill out of the library like a flow of lava, according to Nikolaus Pevsner, "... revealing Mannerism in its most sublime architectural form".

In 1546 Michelangelo produced the highly complex ovoid design for the pavement of the Campidoglio and began designing an upper storey for the Farnese Palace. In 1547 he took on the job of completing St Peter's Basilica, begun to a design by Bramante, and with several intermediate designs by several architects. Michelangelo returned to Bramante's design, retaining the basic form and concepts by simplifying and strengthening the design to create a more dynamic and unified whole. Although the late 16th-century engraving depicts the dome as having a hemispherical profile, the dome of Michelangelo's model is somewhat ovoid and the final product, as completed by Giacomo della Porta, is more so.

=== Final years ===
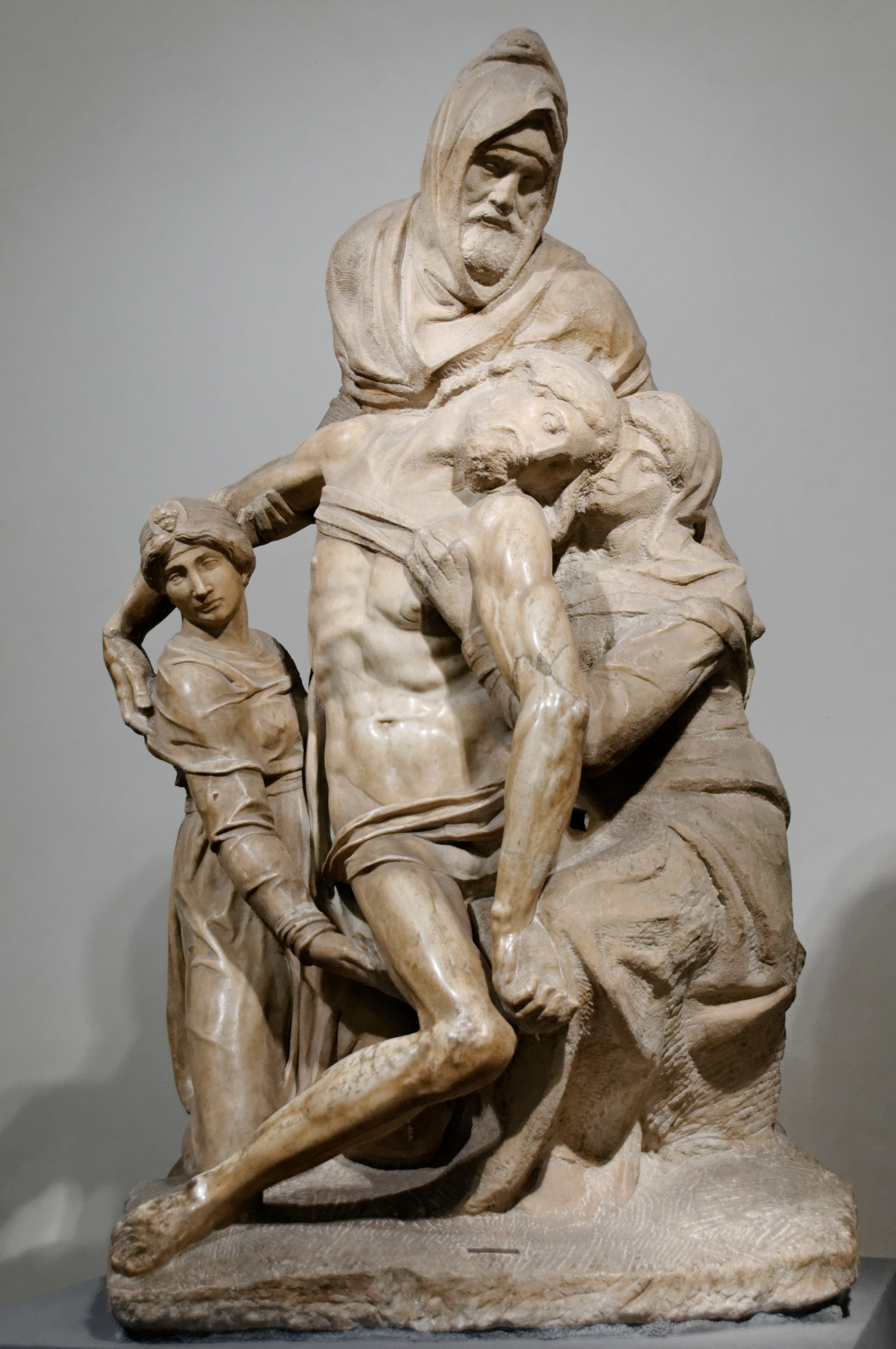
Self-portrait of the artist as Nicodemus

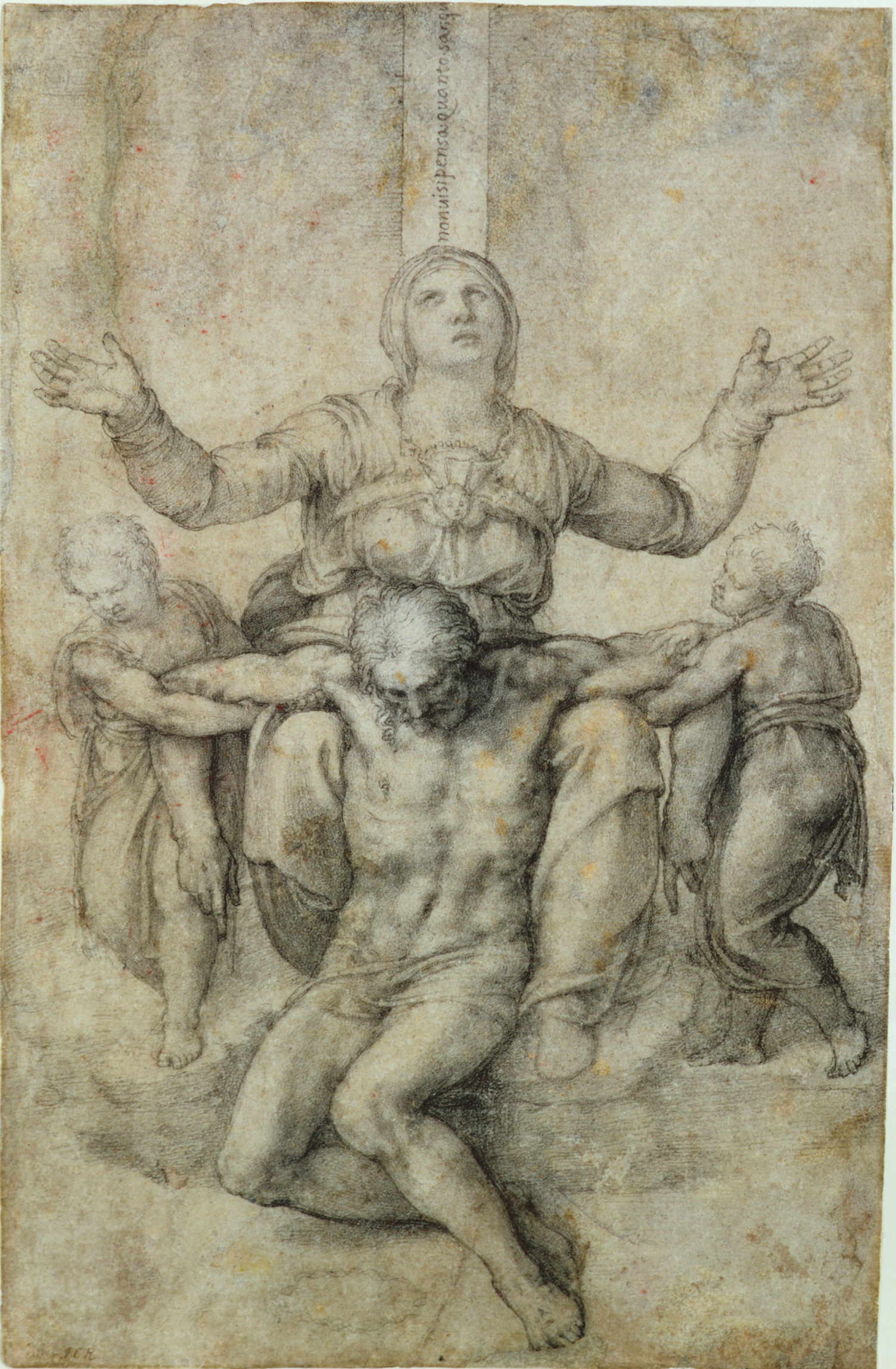
The Pietà of Vittoria Colonna (c. 1540)

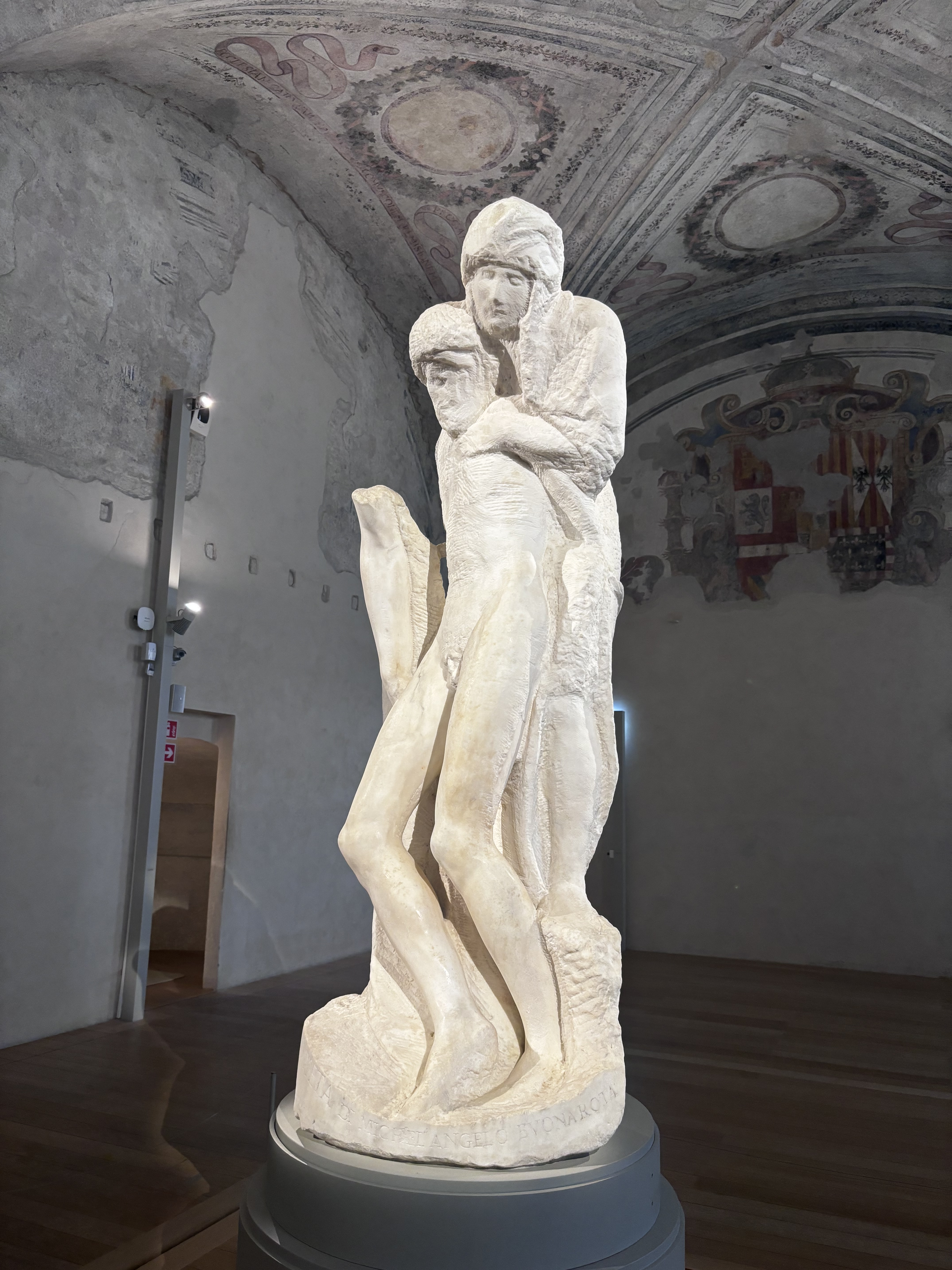
The Rondanini Pietà (1552–1564)

In his old age, Michelangelo created a number of Pietàs in which he apparently reflects upon mortality. They are heralded by the Victory, perhaps created for the tomb of Pope Julius II but left unfinished. In this group, the youthful victor overcomes an older hooded figure, with the features of Michelangelo. The Pietà of Vittoria Colonna is a chalk drawing of a type described as "presentation drawings", as they might be given as a gift by an artist, and were not necessarily studies towards a painted work. In this image, Mary's upraised arms and hands are indicative of her prophetic role. The frontal aspect is reminiscent of Masaccio's fresco of the Holy Trinity in the Basilica of Santa Maria Novella, Florence. In the Florentine Pietà, Michelangelo again depicts himself, this time as the aged Nicodemus lowering the body of Jesus from the cross into the arms of Mary his mother and Mary Magdalene. Michelangelo smashed the left arm and leg of the figure of Jesus. His pupil Tiberio Calcagni repaired the arm and drilled a hole in which to fix a replacement leg which was not subsequently attached. He also worked on the figure of Mary Magdalene.

The last sculpture that Michelangelo worked on (six days before his death), the Rondanini Pietà, could never be completed because Michelangelo carved it away until there was insufficient stone. The legs and a detached arm remain from a previous stage of the work. As it remains, the sculpture has an abstract quality, in keeping with 20th-century concepts of sculpture.

Michelangelo died in Rome on 18 February 1564, at the age of 88. His body was taken from Rome for interment at the Basilica of Santa Croce, fulfilling the maestro's last request to be buried in his beloved Florence. His heir Lionardo Buonarroti commissioned Vasari to design and build the Tomb of Michelangelo, a monumental project that cost 770 scudi, and took over 14 years to complete. Marble for the tomb was supplied by Cosimo I de' Medici, Duke of Tuscany, who had also organized a state funeral to honour Michelangelo in Florence.

== Legacy ==
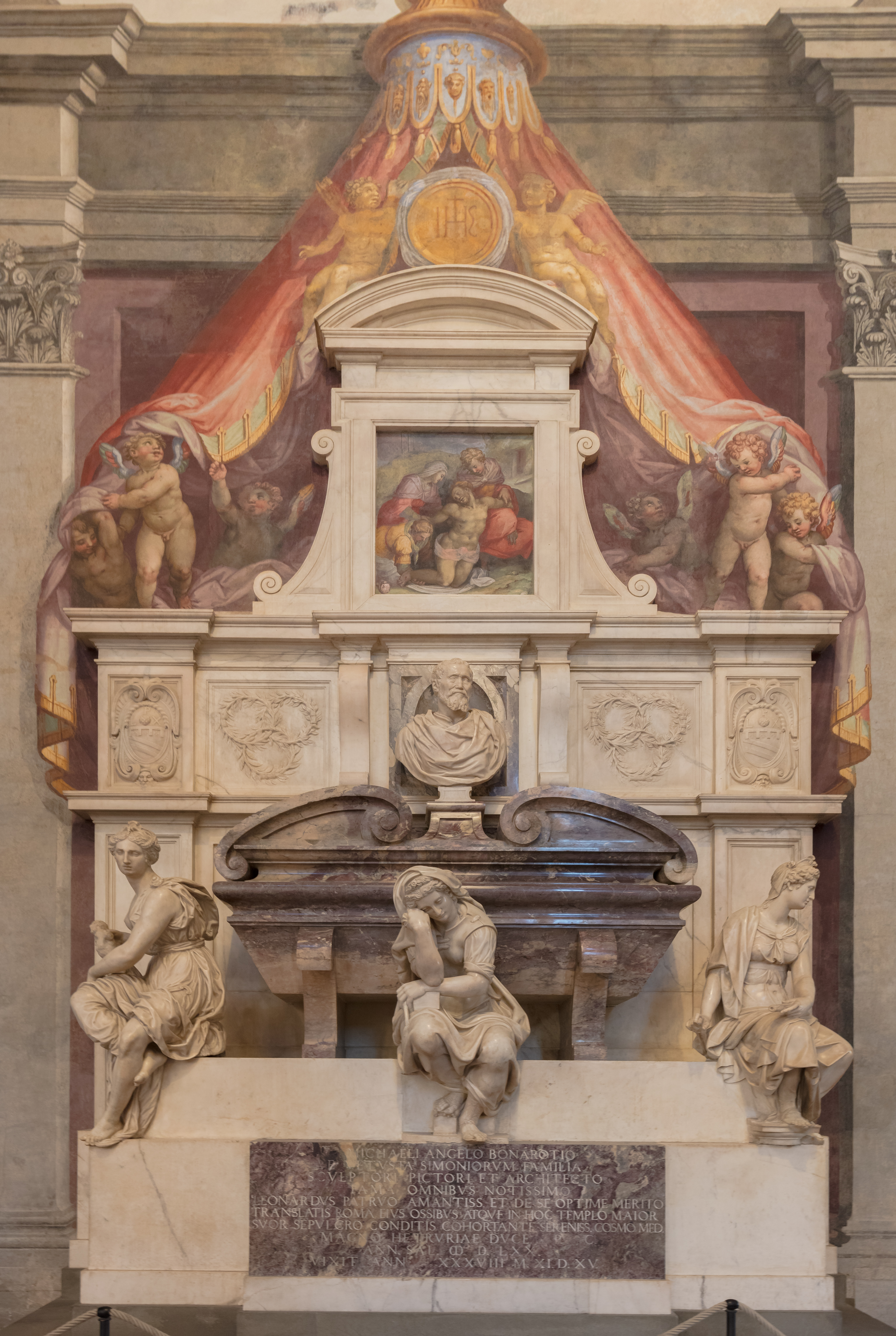
Tomb of Michelangelo (1578) by Giorgio Vasari in Santa Croce, Florence

Michelangelo, with Leonardo da Vinci and Raphael, is one of the three giants of the Florentine High Renaissance. Although their names are often cited together, Michelangelo was younger than Leonardo by 23 years, and eight years older than Raphael. Because of his reclusive nature, he had little to do with either artist and outlived both of them by more than 40 years. Michelangelo took few sculpture students. He employed Granacci, who was his fellow pupil at the Medici Academy, and became one of several assistants on the Sistine Chapel ceiling. Michelangelo appears to have used assistants mainly for the more manual tasks of preparing surfaces and grinding colours. Despite this, his works were to have a great influence on painters, sculptors and architects for many generations to come.

While Michelangelo's David is arguably the most famous nude of all time (it is called by the BBC "the world's most famous statue"), some of his other works have had perhaps even greater impact on the course of art. The twisting forms and tensions of the Victory, the Bruges Madonna and the Medici Madonna make them the heralds of the Mannerist art. The unfinished giants for the tomb of Pope Julius II had profound effect on sculptors such as Rodin and Henry Moore.

Michelangelo's vestibule of the Laurentian Library was one of the earliest buildings to use classical forms in a plastic and expressive manner. This dynamic quality was later to find its major expression in his centrally planned St. Peter's, with its giant order, its rippling cornice and its upward-launching pointed dome. The dome of St. Peter's was to influence the building of churches for many centuries, including Sant'Andrea della Valle in Rome and St Paul's Cathedral, London, as well as the civic domes of public buildings and state capitals across the United States.

Artists who were directly influenced by Michelangelo include Raphael, whose monumental treatment of the figure in the School of Athens and The Expulsion of Heliodorus from the Temple owes much to Michelangelo, and whose fresco of Isaiah in Sant'Agostino closely imitates the older master's prophets. Other artists, such as Pontormo, drew on the writhing forms of the Last Judgment and the frescoes of the Cappella Paolina.

The Sistine Chapel ceiling was a work of unprecedented grandeur, both for its architectonic forms, to be imitated by many Baroque ceiling painters, and also for the wealth of its inventiveness in the study of figures. Vasari wrote:

The work has proved a veritable beacon to our art, of inestimable benefit to all painters, restoring light to a world that for centuries had been plunged into darkness. Indeed, painters no longer need to seek for new inventions, novel attitudes, clothed figures, fresh ways of expression, different arrangements, or sublime subjects, for this work contains every perfection possible under those headings.

== In popular culture ==
- Vita di Michelangelo (1964)
- The Agony and the Ecstasy (1965), directed by Carol Reed and starring Charlton Heston as Michelangelo
- A Season of Giants (1990)
- Michelangelo - Endless (2018), starring Enrico Lo Verso as Michelangelo
- Sin (2019), directed by Andrei Konchalovsky

== See also ==
- Italian Renaissance sculpture
- Italian Renaissance painting
- Michelangelo and the Medici
- Michelangelo phenomenon
- Nicodemite
- Michelangelus

== Sources ==
- Bartz, Gabriele; Eberhard König (1998). Michelangelo. Könemann. ISBN 978-3-8290-0253-0.
- Clément, Charles (1892). Michelangelo. Harvard University: S. Low, Marston, Searle, & Rivington, Ltd.: London. "michelangelo."
- Condivi, Ascanio; Alice Sedgewick (1999) [First published 1553]. The Life of Michelangelo. Pennsylvania State University Press. ISBN 978-0-271-01853-9.
- Gayford, Martin (2013). Michelangelo: His Epic Life. London: Penguin Books. ISBN 978-0-141-93225-5.
- Goldscheider, Ludwig (1962). Michelangelo: Paintings, Sculptures, Architecture. Phaidon Publishers.
- Goldscheider, Ludwig (1966) [1951]. Michelangelo Drawings. Phaidon Publishers.
- Gardner, Helen; Fred S. Kleiner, Christin J. Mamiya, Gardner's Art through the Ages. Thomson Wadsworth, (2004) ISBN 0-15-505090-7.
- Hirst, Michael and Jill Dunkerton. (1994) The Young Michelangelo: The Artist in Rome 1496–1501. London: National Gallery Publications, ISBN 1-85709-066-7
- Liebert, Robert (1983). Michelangelo: A Psychoanalytic Study of his Life and Images. New Haven and London: Yale University Press. ISBN 978-0-300-02793-8.
- Paoletti, John T. and Radke, Gary M., (2005) Art in Renaissance Italy, Laurence King, ISBN 1-85669-439-9
- Tolnay, Charles (1947). The Youth of Michelangelo. Princeton, NJ: Princeton University Press.
