= San Giorgio in Poggiale, Bologna =

Church building in Bologna, Italy

Coordinates: 44.4974°N 11.3392°E

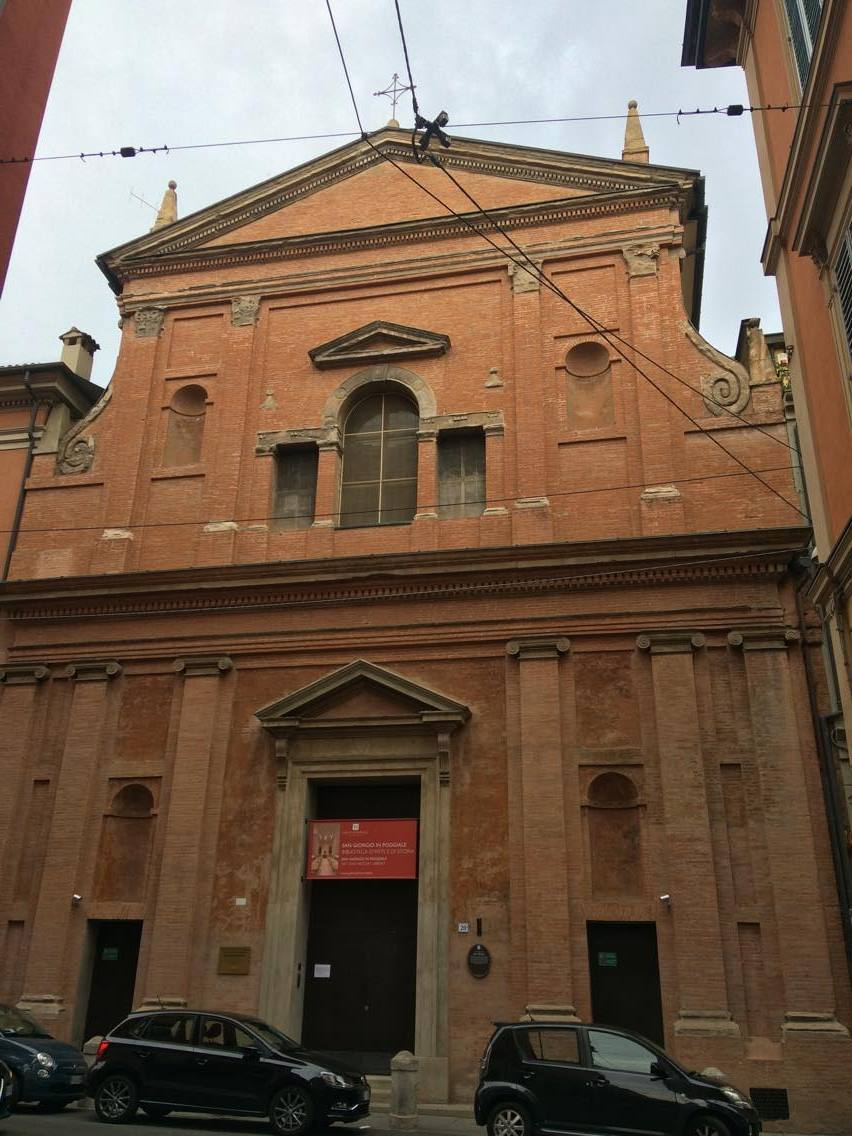
The church of San Giorgio in Poggiale in Bologna.

San Giorgio in Poggiale is a Baroque-style, deconsecrated, former Roman Catholic church, now serving as the Art and History Library of Fondazione Carisbo (the former owner of Carisbo), located on Via Nazario Sauro 20 in central Bologna, Italy.

== History ==
A church on the site had been present since the Lombard era, but the present layout was designed by the architect Tommaso Martelli, and built between 1589 and 1633. The initial custodians of the church were priests of the Servite order. In 1798, the church and adjacent convent was suppressed by the Napoleonic Government. Till 1919, the street in front was known as Via del Poggiale. The Bell-tower was built between 1760 and 1763. With the restoration of the Duchy, the church was assigned to Franciscan Order till 1842, then to the Jesuits in 1882. It was partially destroyed during an aerial bombardment on September 25, 1943.

Nearly destroyed in the decades after the war, the building was acquired by the Fondazione Cassa di Risparmio in Bologna, and they commissioned a reconstruction by architect Michele De Lucchi. The modern library was opened in 2009. The reading room houses works by Claudio Parmiggiani as well as Piero Pizzi Cannella’s Cattedrali cycle.

The church lacks all it internal painted decoration. The nave was once frescoed with the Fasti di San Pietro Celestino by Giacomo Boni and Giacinto Garofalini. The quadratura was painted by Luca Antonio Bistega. The chapels had altarpieces by Lucio Massari (la Maddalena), Anna Maria Crescimbeni, Marcantonio Franceschini, Emilio Taruffi, Enrico Haffner, Grilli, Giovanni Battista Bertusio and il Mastelletta. The sacristy and decoration was designed by Francesco Tadolini with stucco-work by Petronio Tadolini, Antonio Gamberini, and Martino Bagutti.

Luciano Pavarotti recorded Passione (Neapolitan Songs) in this space July 22–31, 1985.
