= Santa Maria del Borgo, Budrio =

Church in Budrio, Italy

Santa Maria del Borgo is a small Roman Catholic church, once more of an oratory belonging to a local confraternity, located next to the Palazzo Comunale of Budrio, province of Bologna, region of Emilia Romagna, Italy.

== History ==
The church was founded in 1517 and completed in 1617 under the patronage of the Confraternity of Compagnia del Borgo, also known as the Company of the Santissimo Crocefisso (Holiest Crucifix). The small structure has three side chapels. The main chapel has a 16th-century crucifix held in an 18th century frame by Pietro Roppa. Three canvas altarpieces in the church depict in turn: the Flight to Egypt (1620) by Giovanni Andrea Donducci (il Mastelletta); the Martyrdom of St Stephan by Pietro Faccini; and a Birth of the Virgin by Bartolomeo Cesi.In 1910, the interior of the church, and the superior portion of the main portal were restored by the sculptor Arturo Orsoni.
