= Spisanelli =

Spisanelli is an Italian surname. Notable people with the surname include:

- Giulio Spisanelli (died 1658), Italian painter
- Vincenzo Spisanelli (1595–1662), Italian painter, father of Giulio
