= Biblioteca of San Domenico, Bologna =

Library in Bologna, Italy

Coordinates: 44°29′22.4″N 11°20′38.1″E

The Biblioteca or Library of San Domenico is in the convent of the Dominican Order, San Domenico in Bologna, region of Emilia Romagna, Italy.

A library was founded soon after the convent was built, linked to the School of Theology run by the convent. The library layout is a basilica structure with a series of columns and rounded arches, modelled in 1466 by Giovanni Rossi after the Library of San Marco of Florence. Other sources cite Gaspare Nadi, as the architect. Part of the library complex is now the seat of the faculty of philosophy and theology, run by the Dominicans.

At one end of the library is a room built in 1497 by the jurist Ludovico Bolognini. The room has Renaissance-style decoration with stuccoes by Antonio Maria Fontana. It has a painting of St Thomas Aquinas by Marcantonio Franceschini.

It contains a collection of 35 ancient choral books written on parchment.
