= San Girolamo dell'Arcoveggio =

Church in Bologna, Italy

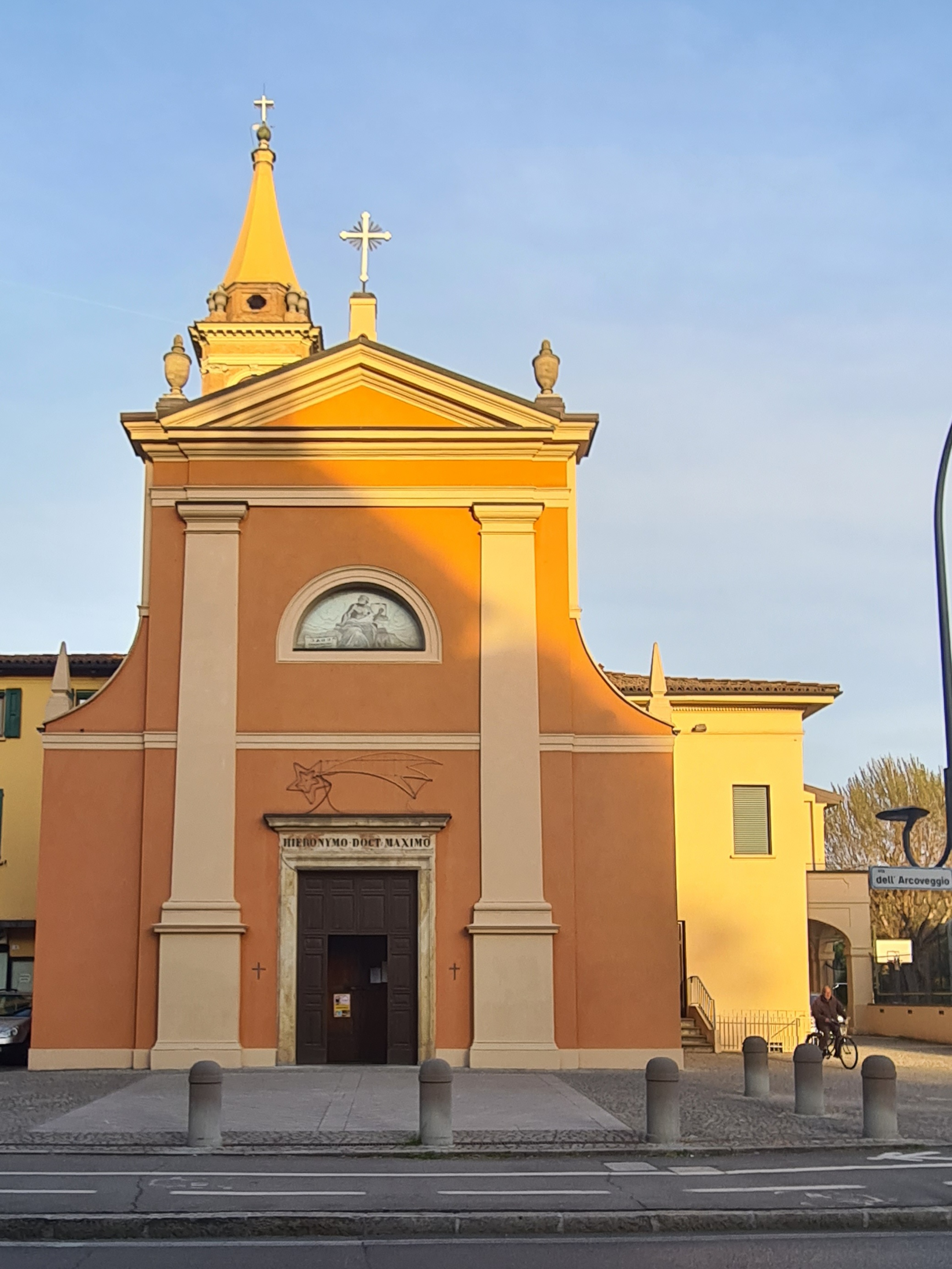
San Girolamo dell'Arcoveggio.jpg

San Girolamo dell'Arcoveggio is a Roman Catholic parish church located on Via Dell'Arcoveggio in Bologna, Italy.

== History ==
The church is dedicated to Saint Jerome. The church was first erected in 1338 in the neighborhood of Arcoveggio, so called due to an ancient arch remaining from a Roman bridge that spanned the Savena river. In 1567, cardinal Gabriele Paleotti converts this into a parish church refurbishing the church in neoclassic style. The bell tower dates to 1880. An inventory from 1844 noted a painting in the portal of St Jerome. The interior contained altarpieces by il Mastellatta and Ubaldo Gandolfi.
