= San Domenico, Bologna =

Major church in Bologna, Italy

Coordinates: 44.4895°N 11.3445°E

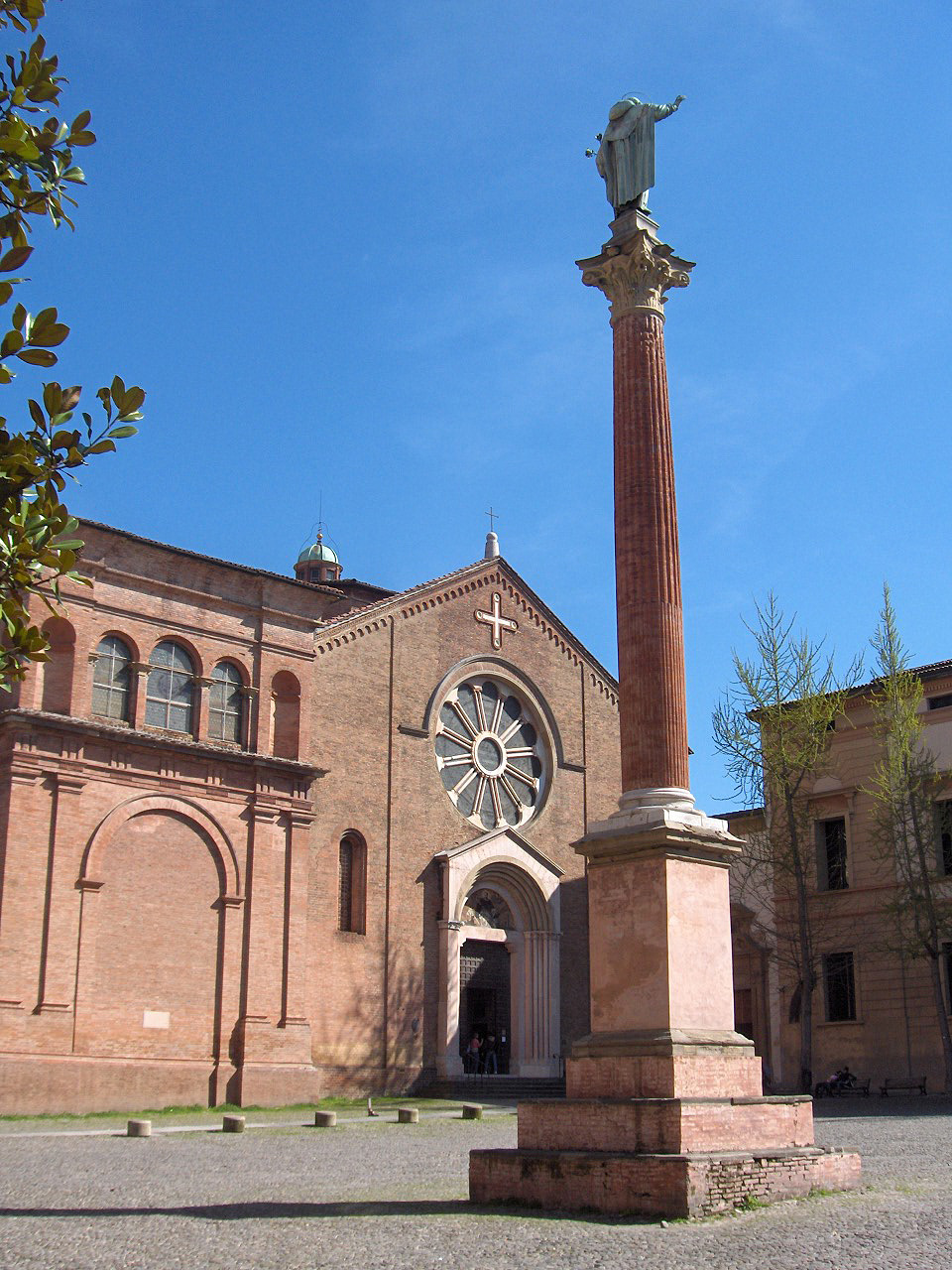
The church of San Domenico with column of St Dominic

The Basilica of San Domenico is one of the major churches in Bologna, Italy. The remains of Saint Dominic, founder of the Order of Preachers (Dominicans), are buried inside the exquisite shrine Arca di San Domenico, made by Nicola Pisano and his workshop, Arnolfo di Cambio and with later additions by Niccolò dell'Arca and the young Michelangelo.

== History ==
Dominic Guzman, on arriving in Bologna in January 1218, was impressed by the vitality of the city and quickly recognized the importance of this university town to his evangelizing mission. A convent was established at the Mascarella church by the Blessed Reginald of Orleans. As this convent soon became too small for their increasing number, the preaching Brothers moved in 1219 to the small church of San Nicolò of the Vineyards at the outskirts of Bologna. St. Dominic settled in this church and held here the first two General Chapters of the order (1220 and 1221). Saint Dominic died in this church on 6 August 1221. He was buried behind the altar of San Nicolò.

Between 1219 and 1243 the Dominicans bought all surrounding plots of land around the church. After the death of Saint Dominic, the church of San Nicolò was expanded and a new monastic complex was built between 1228 and 1240. The apsidal area of the church was demolished and the nave was extended and grew into the Basilica of Saint-Dominic, This church became the prototype of many other Dominican churches throughout the world.

The big basilica was divided in two parts:

- the front part, called “internal church”, was the church of the brothers. It was built in a protogothic style with a nave, two aisles and ogival vaults.
- the church for the faithful, called “external church”, with the simple columns and the trussed flat roof of the old church.

Both churches were divided by a ramp. The church was consecrated by Pope Innocent IV on 17 October 1251. On this occasion the crucifix by Giunta Pisano was shown for the first time to the faithful.

The church was enlarged and the two sections were modified in many ways in the course of the next centuries. New side chapels were built, the majority in the 15th century. A Roman-Gothic bell tower was added in 1313 (recently restored). The dividing wall between the two churches was finally demolished in the beginning of the 17th century. The choir was at the same time moved behind the altar. Between 1728 and 1732 the interior of the church was completely renewed by the architect Carlo Francesco Dotti, sponsored by the Dominican pope Benedict XIII, into its present-day Baroque style.

From an early stage in the church's history, it has been receiving artworks. This has grown into the present-day vast collection of art treasures created by Italian artists, including Nicola Pisano, Arnolfo di Cambio, Niccolò dell'Arca, Michelangelo, Iacopo da Bologna, Guido Reni, Guercino and Filippino Lippi.

=== Arca ===
The remains of the saint were moved in 1233 from its place behind the altar to a simple marble sarcophagus, situated on the floor in the right aisle of the church for the faithful. Since most of the pilgrims, who came in great numbers to see the grave, were not able to see this shrine, hidden by so many people standing in front of it, the need was felt for a new shrine. The shrine was designed by Nicola Pisano in 1264.

In 1267 the remains of Saint Dominic were then moved from the simple sarcophagus into the new shrine, decorated with the main episodes from the life of the Saint. While the Dominicans picked the artist, the project was funded as a civic monument with a special tax. In the 15th century Niccolò dell'Arca added a canopy Work would continue on this shrine for almost five centuries.

== Square and façade ==
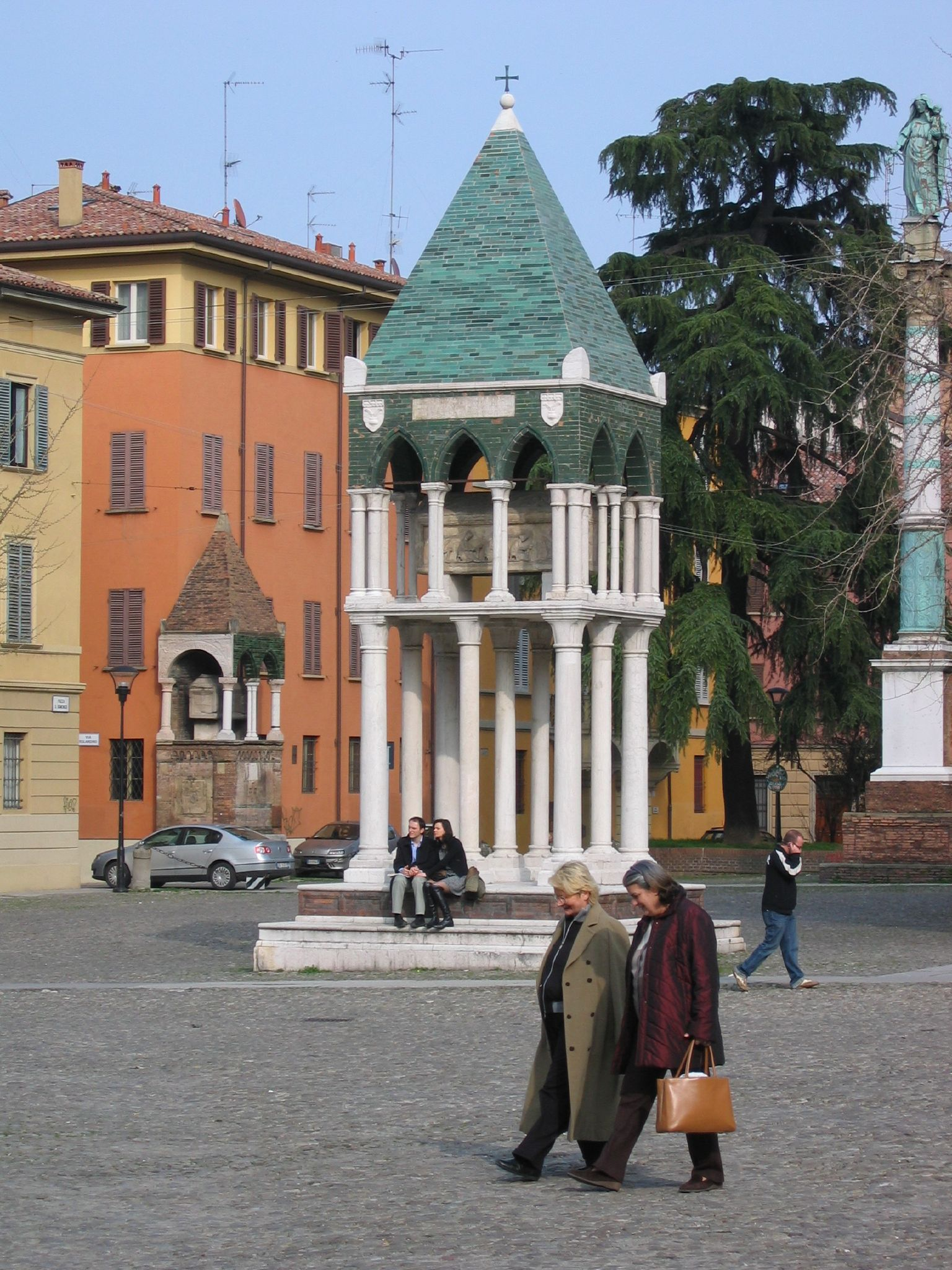
In front, tomb of Rolandino de’ Passeggeri; behind : the tomb of Egidio Foscarari.

The square in front of the church is paved with pebbles, as it was in medieval times. The square was used by the faithful to listen to the sermon from the preacher from the pulpit on the left corner of the church. It was also the original cemetery.

The column in the middle of the square is a brickwork column with the bronze statue of St Dominic (1627) and on the back of the square a column in marble, bricks and copper of the Madonna of the Rosary, after a design by Guido Reni (1632), commemorating the end of the plague in the city.

Behind the first column stands the tomb of Rolandino de’ Passeggeri by Giovanni (1305) and on the left, adjoining a house, the tomb of Egidio Foscarari (1289), enriched with an ancient Byzantine marble arch with relief works from the 9th century.

The Romanesque façade dates from 1240 and was restored in 1910 by the architect Raffaele Faccioli. In the center is a large, embroidered rose window. The lunette above the portal contains a copy (1921) of St Dominic blessing Bologna by Lucia Casalini-Torelli (1677–1762).

On the left side of the façade is the Lodovico Ghisilardi chapel in Renaissance style. It was built as an example of Vitruvian classicism by the architect Baldassarre Peruzzi around 1530.

== Interior ==
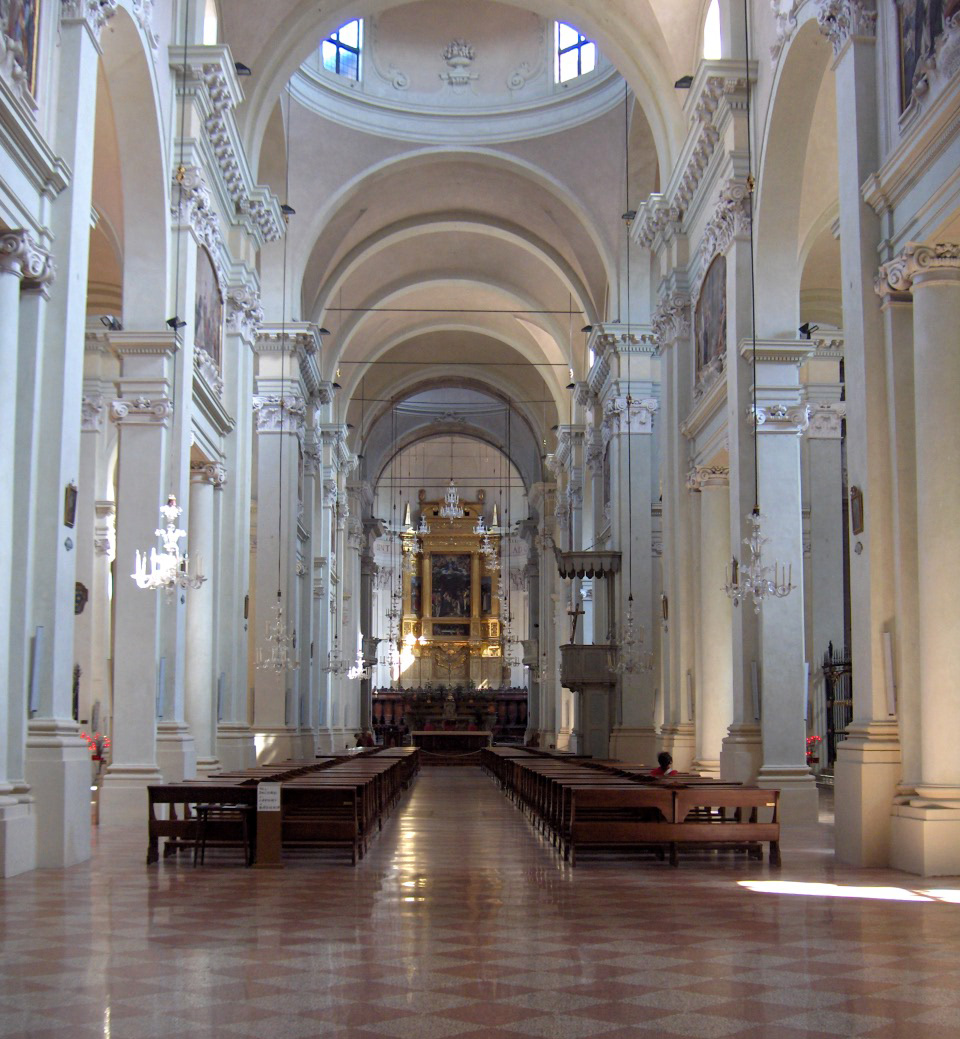
Nave

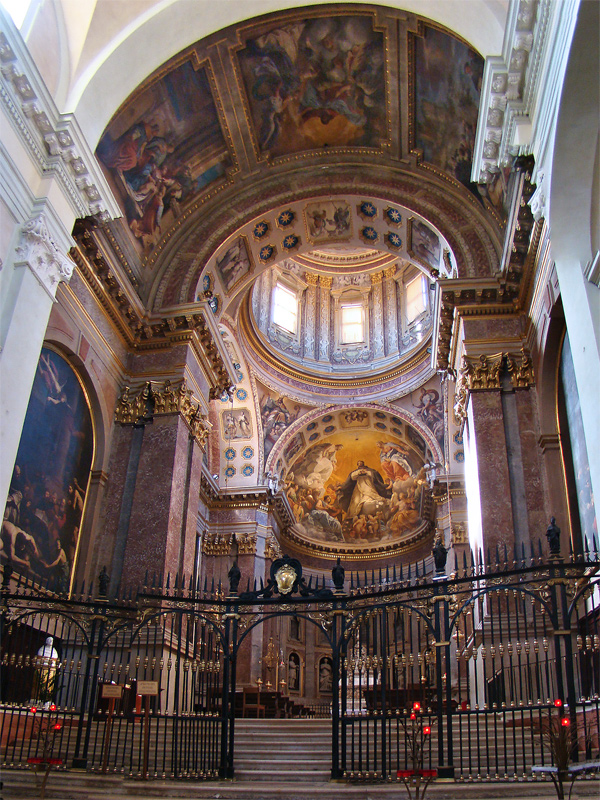
St. Dominic's chapel

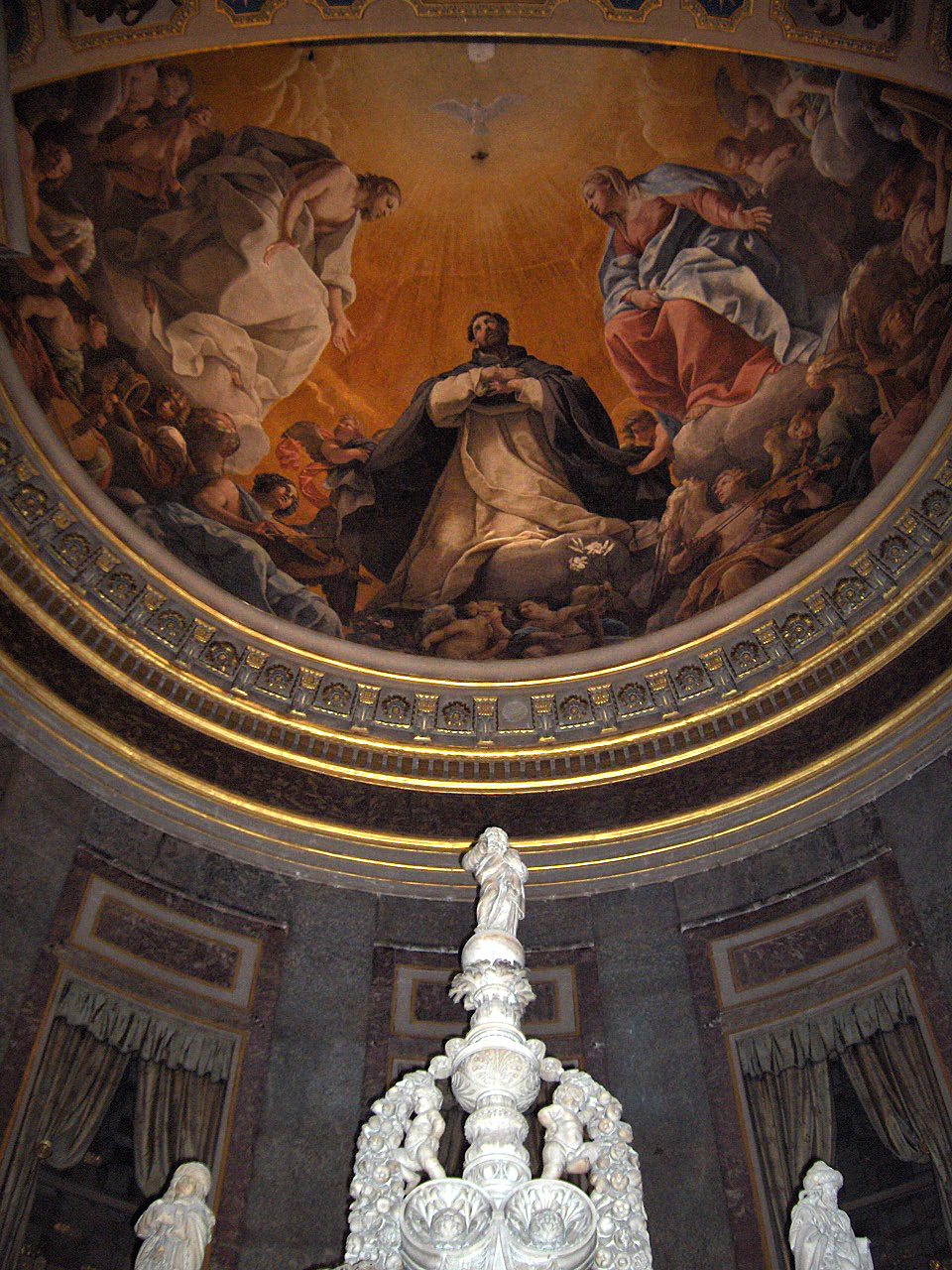
St Dominic's Glory by Guido Reni; St. Dominic's chapel.

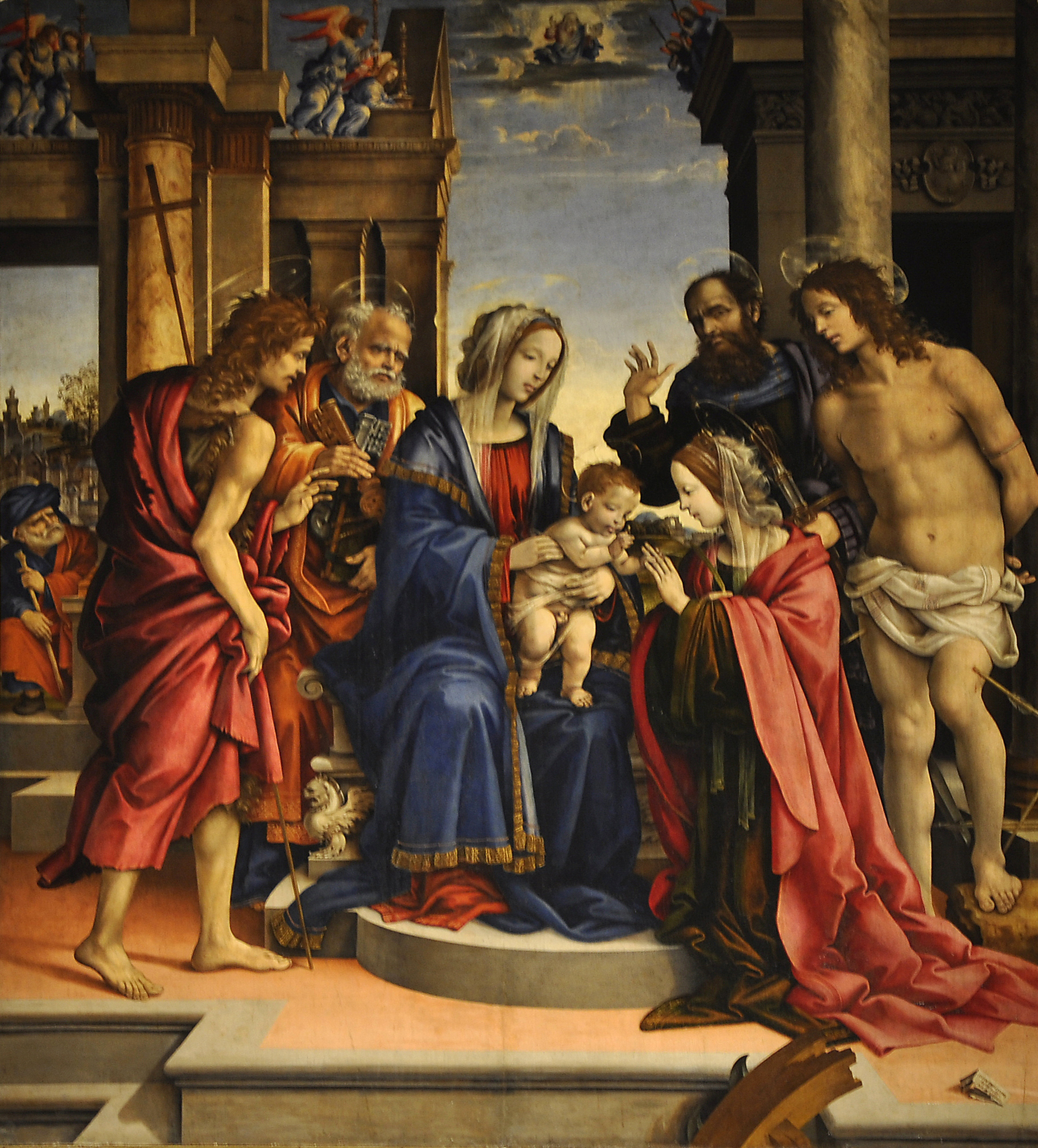
Mystical Marriage of St. Catherine by Filippino Lippi.

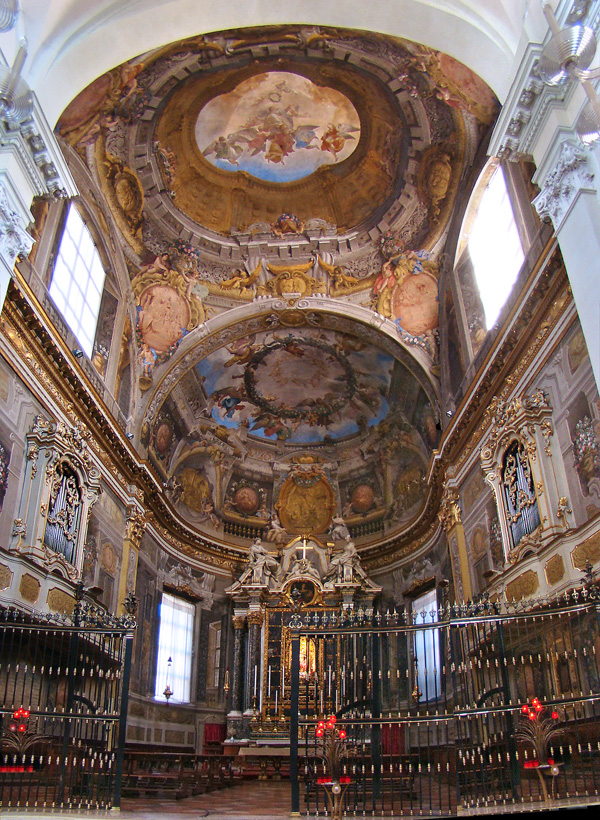
Rosary Chapel

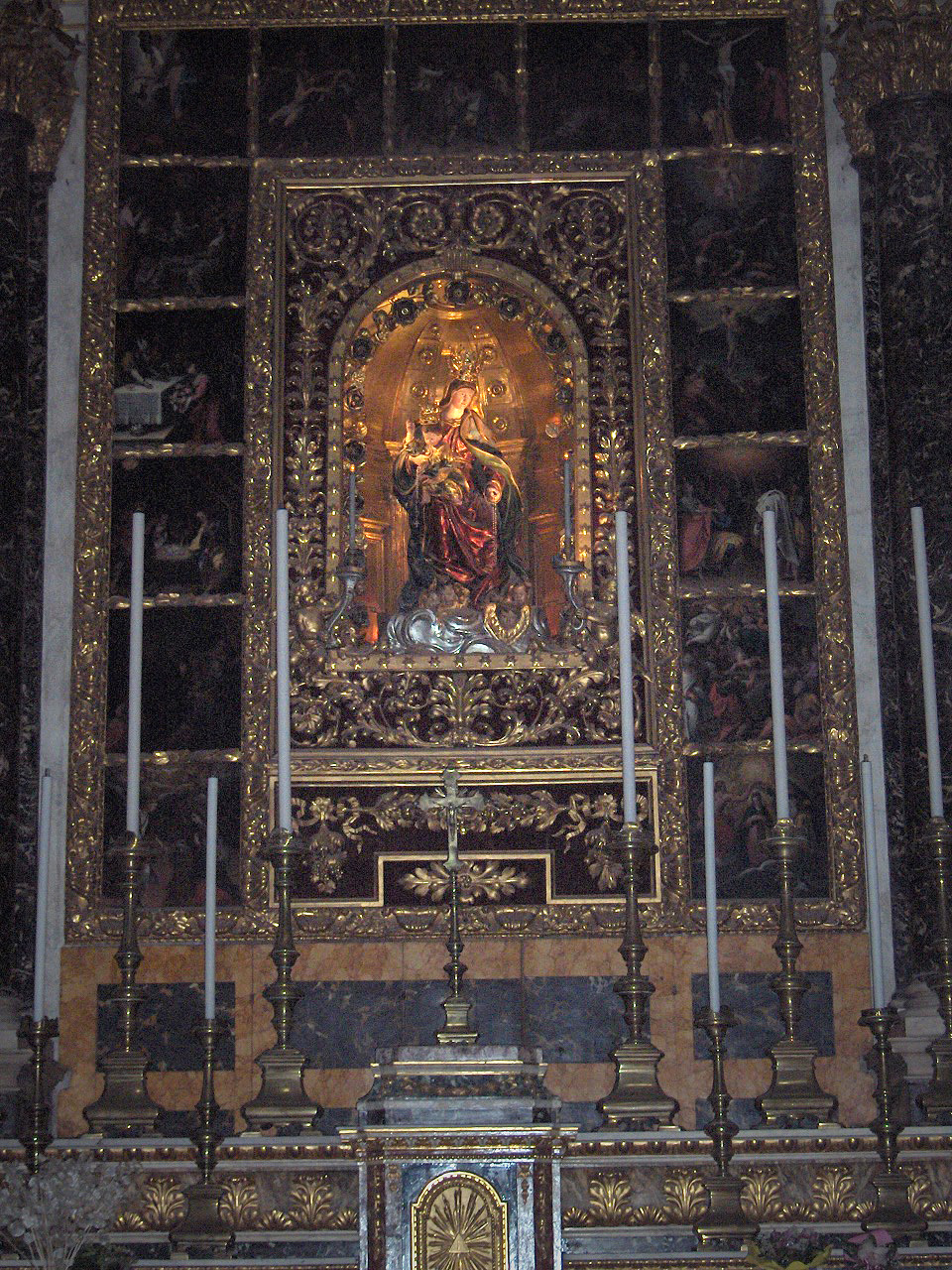
Altar in the Rosary Chapel

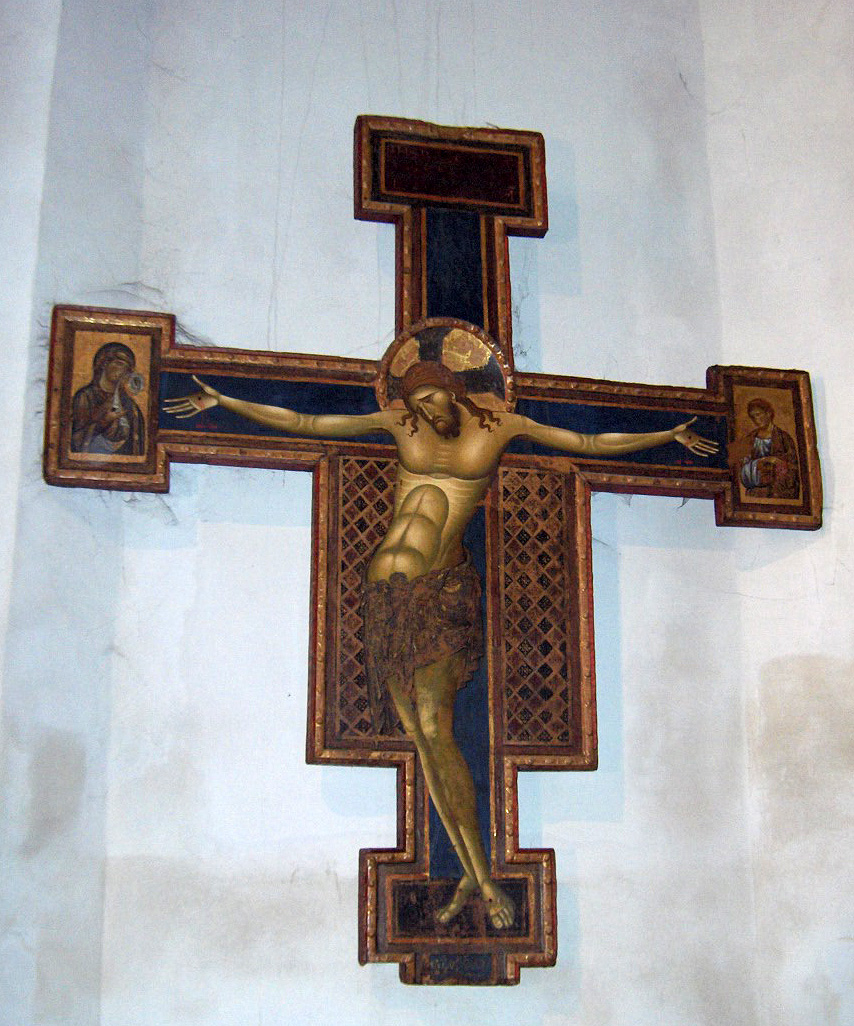
Crucifixion by Giunta Pisano

=== Nave ===
The church consists of a central nave, two lateral aisles, several side chapels, a transept, a choir and an apse. The interior was completely renewed in Baroque style with refined elegance and well-balanced proportions by the architect Carlo Francesco Dotti (1678–1759). In the lunettes above the Ionic columns along the nave we can see 10 paintings, depicting episodes (true and untrue) in the history of the church. The first two are by Giuseppe Pedretti (1696–1778), the others by Vittorio Bigari (1692–1776).

=== Chapels on the right side ===
- Chapel of St. Rose of Lima : the painting above the altar, portraying the Ecstasy of the Saint, is by Cesare Gennari. The altar-piece Virgin appearing to St. Hyacinth by Ludovico Carracci (now in the Louvre), used to stand here.
- Chapel of St. Vincent Ferrer : the painting above the altar (St. Vincent brings a young boy back to life) is by Donato Creti (1731). On both sides of the chapel are two painting, representing the Miracles of the Saint, by Giuseppe Pedretti. The elegant stucco angels are by Angelo Pio (1690–1769), one of the best artists of his time.
- Chapel of St Antoninus of Florence : The painting above the altar (The Lord and the Blessed Virgin Appearing to St. Antoninus and St. Francis) is by Pietro Facini (1562–1602), while the paintings on the side walls (Blessed Matteo Carreri and Blessed Stefania) are by Pietro Dardani (1728–1808).
- Chapel of St. Andrew the Apostle : paintings of the Coming Martyrdom of the Apostle, Blessed Imelda and Blessed Giovanna are by Antonio Rossi (1700–1753)
- Chapel of Madonna of Fevers: above the altar is the painting Sant’Emidio by Filippo Gargalli (1750–1835). The painting Slaughter of the Innocents by Guido Reni, now in Bologna’s Pinacoteca Nazionale, was once hung in this chapel.
- St Dominic’s chapel: this is the main chapel of the church. It has a square plan and a semi-circular apse, where the remains of the saint rest in the splendid Arca di San Domenico under the cupola which contains three Michelangelo sculptures, Angel, St. Proclus, and St. Petronius. The chapel was built by the Bolognese architect Floriano Ambrosini, replacing the old gothic chapel from 1413, to match the splendour of the other existing chapels. It was decorated between 1614 and 1616 by important painters of the Bolognese School, Tiarini (1577–1688), Mario Righetti, Lionello Spada, Mastelletta, culminating in the fresco on the cupola of the apse St Dominic’s Glory, a masterpiece by Reni, painted between 1613 and 1615. The Theological and The Cardinal Virtues in the niches of the apse were painted by Giovanni Todeschi between 1617 and 1631. The bust in white marble by Carlo Pini (1946) represents the real face of Saint Dominic, modeled on the precise measurements performed on the saint’s skull.
- Chapel of St Pius V : the altar-piece is by Felice Torelli.
- Chapel of St Hyacinth of Poland : with the painting A Miracle of the Saint by Antonio Muzzi.
- Chapel of St Catherine of Siena: with St Catherine’s Mystic Communion by Francesco Brizzi (1546–1625) above the altar.
- Chapel of St Catherine Virgin and Martyr: the painting above the altar, Mystical Marriage of St Catherine, is an important panel and one of the last works by Filippino Lippi (1501–1503).

=== Chapels on the left side ===
- Chapel of St. Louis Bertrand : contains two canvases: (on the right) Blessed Pietro Geremia by Alessandro Tiarini and (on the left) St. Albert the Great by Clemente Bevilacqua (died 1754)
- Chapel of the Holy Blood has some important paintings : (on the right) Annunciation by Denis Calvaert (1540–1619), (above the central altar) St. Michael Archangel by Giacomo Francia (1484–1557), (on the left) St Martin de Porres by Renzo Magnanini, (in the big lunette) The Disputation of St Catherine Virgin and Martyr by Prospero Fontana
- Chapel of Blessed Benedict XI with the painting The Blessed is taken to Heaven by Felice Torelli (1667–1748)
- Rosary Chapel is the most prominent chapel on this side of the church. The vivacious fresco on the vault (the Assumption) and in the apse (Heaven and Earth praising the Madonna of the Rosary) were painted between 1655 and 1657 by Angelo Michele Colonna (1600–1687) and by Agostino Mitelli (1609–1660). The two choir stalls were designed by the architect Carlo Francesco Dotti in 1736 after the redesigning of the interior of the church. The altar was designed by the Bolognese architect Floriano Ambrosini (1557–1621). But the most important paintings in this large chapel are the famous Mysteries of the Rosary, finished in 1601. The most prominent artist of their time worked on the decoration : Lodovico Carracci (the Annunciation and the Visitation), Bartolomeo Cesi (the Nativity), Denis Calvaert (Presentation of Jesus in the Temple), the female artist Lavinia Fontana (Jesus among the Doctors and the Coronation of the Virgin), Bartolomeo Cesi (Christ in the garden), Ludovico Carracci (the Scourging and Christ falling under the Cross), Bartolomeo Cesi (the Crowning with Thorns, the Crucifixion and Pentecost), Guido Reni (the Resurrection), Domenichino (the Assumption of the Blessed Virgin).

Young Wolfgang Amadeus Mozart played on the organ in this chapel, while he was studying with padre Giovanni Battista Martini in 1769.

- Vestibule of the side door contains the marble tomb of Alessandro Tartagni (1477) by Francesco di Simone Ferrucci da Fiesole (1437–1493).
- Chapel of St Joseph : the canvas above the altar is Death of St. Joseph and St Anthony abbot by Giovanni Battista Bertusio (died 1644), and the paintings on the left (San Teresa di Gesù) and on the right (St Anthony of Padua) are by Giovanni Breviglieri.
- Chapel of St. Peter Martyr : the painting above the altar Kneeling Saint is by Giuseppe Pedretti, while the paintings on the left (Sant’Agnese da Montepulciano) and on the right (St Catherine de Ricci) are by Pietro Dardani (1728–1808)
- Chapel of St Raymond of Peñafort contains the famous canvas the Saint plowing the Waves on his Mantle by Ludovico Carracci
- Chapel of Blessed Ceslaus with the painting the Blessed by Lucia Casalini-Torrelli

=== Right transept ===
There is a small chapel on the right side of the altar with a painting by the Baroque artist Bartolomeo Cesi and a canvas by Guercino St. Thomas Aquinas writing the Holy Sacrament (1662)

=== Left transept ===
- Chapel of the Holy Cross: On the wall is a marble slab, carved in 1731 by Giuseppe Maria Mazza, commemorating the death in 1272 of King Enzio of Sardinia, son of the Holy Roman Emperor Frederick II. He had been captured by the Bolognese Guelph forces in the Battle of Fossalta in 1249. The painting above the altar is Christ being laid down by Pier Francesco Cavazza (1667–1733), while on the right is the Assumption of the Madonna by Vincenzo Spisanelli (1595–1662).
- Chapel of St Michael the Archangel : Here on view is the imposing Crucifixion, the masterpiece by Giunta Pisano (mid-13th century). It is still much influenced by the Byzantine style and represents one of the best examples of 13th-century Italian painting. This crucifix has much influenced Cimabue, who would then slowly evolve into his own style. On the right side we find the marble monument, spanning the two chapels, dedicated to the Bolognese ruler Taddeo Pepoli (died 1347) (who added in 1340 a barrel span to the northern transept of this church). This monument was begun in the 14th century and only finished in the 16th century. The fresco on the left wall St. Thomas Aquinas and St. Benedict dates from the 14th century.
- Chapel of the Sacred Heart: The papier-mâché bust of Ven. Serafino Capponi, a theologian (died 1615) is on the left side of the altar. Beneath the altar is the urn with the relics of James Griesinger, the Blessed James from Ulm (died 1491), who added most of the stained-glass windows to this church (now destroyed). He is also depicted on canvas in this chapel by Giacinto Bellini (1612–1660). The fresco Madonna with Child among the Saints is by an unknown Emilian artist at the end of the 13th century. Facing King Enzo’s monument is a fragment of a 14th-century fresco Face of St Thomas Aquinas

== The choir ==
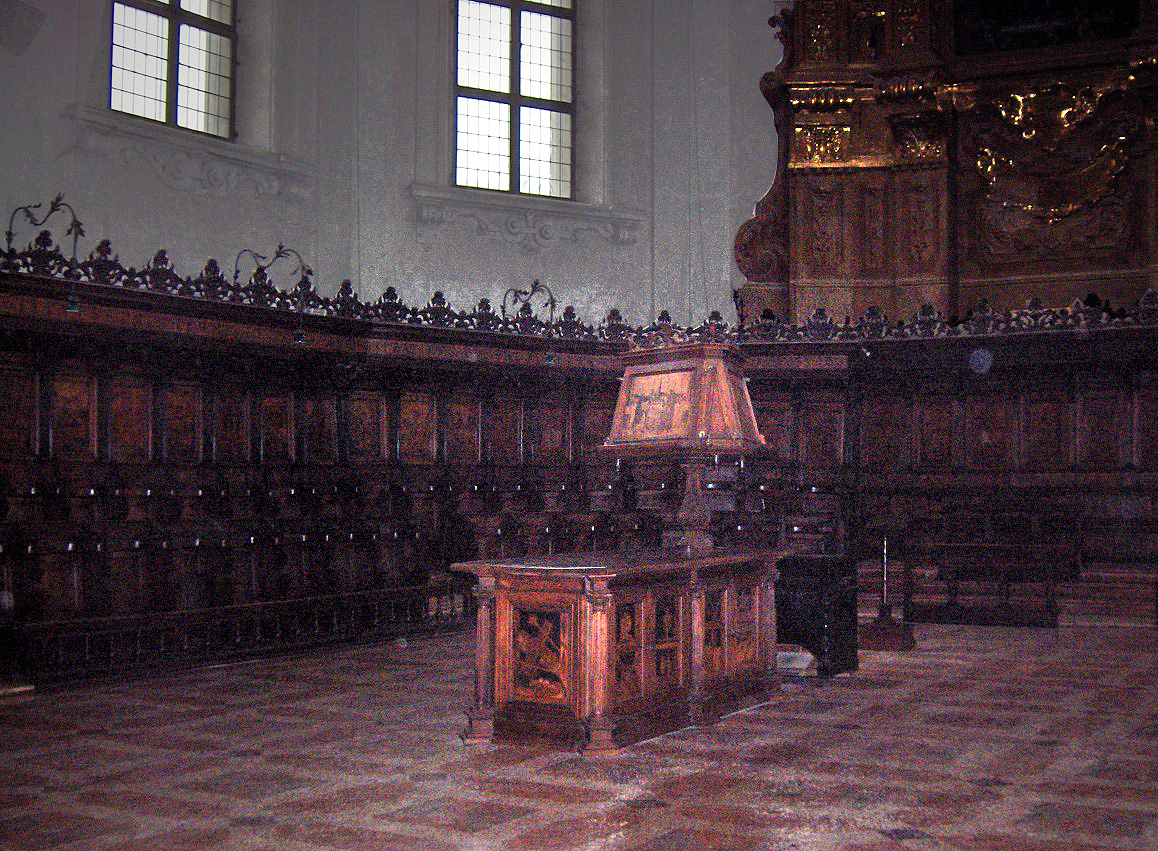
Left side of the choir

This monumental choir was moved behind the high altar in the 17th century. The original altar was a masterpiece decorated with basreliefs and nine sculptures by Giovanni di Balduccio (1330), a pupil of Giovanni Pisano. Now only the statue of St Peter the Martyr still exists and is on display in the City Museum. The present high altar was made by Alfonso Torreggiani (died 1764). In the middle of the golden altar-piece at the back of the apse, is the Adoration of the Magi by Bartolomeo Cesi, flanked by paintings (on its left side) of Saint Nicholas of Bari and (on its right side) of Saint Dominic. Below is the Miracle of the Bread by Vincenzo Spisanelli.

Constructed for the Dominican friars to use during their Conventual Mass and the Liturgy of the Hours, the 102 wooden choir stalls are an exquisite example of Renaissance carving by the friar Damiano da Bergamo. (1528–1530). Between 1541 and 1549 they were inlaid with intaglia by the same artist, using a series of drawings from a book by Giacomo Barozzi da Vignola, and carved by his brother Stefano da Bergamo. The work was finished by brother Bernardino da Bologna. These decorations display scenes from the Old Testament (on the right side) and from the New Testament (on the left side). Because of its extraordinary artistic value, this remarkable marquetry work was considered by its contemporaries as the eight wonder of the world. It is also noted in the Vite (IV,94) by Giorgio Vasari

== The museum ==
The church's small museum houses many important works of art and a wide collection of precious reliquaries, chalices and monstrances.

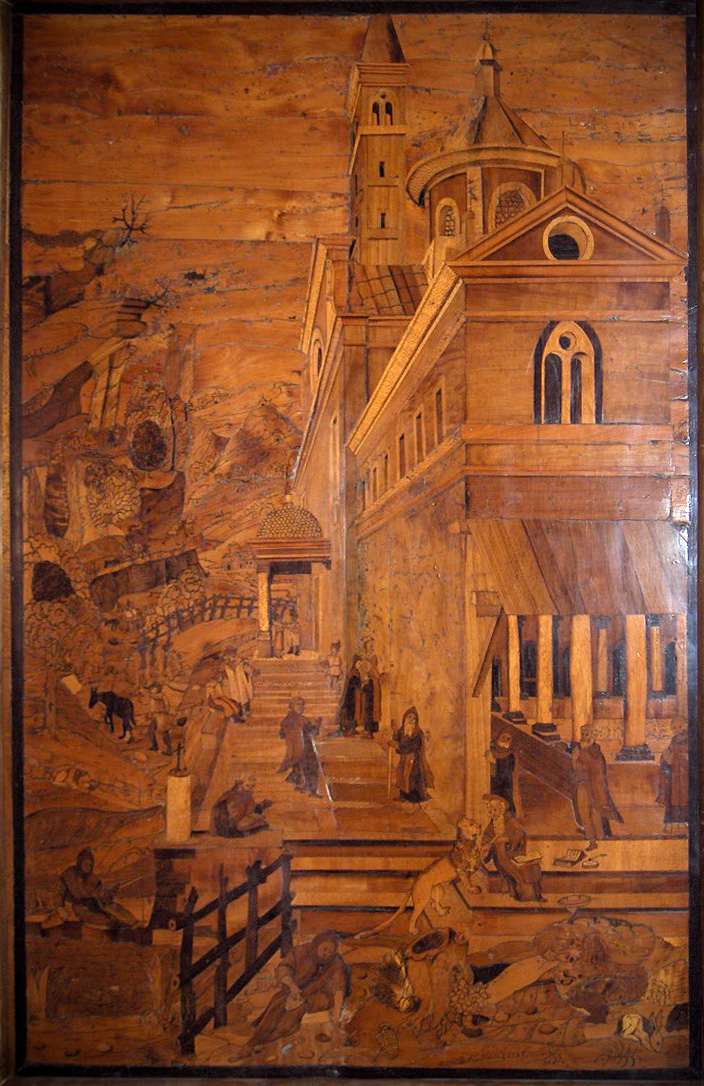
The Story of San Girolomo, intarsia by fra Damiano da Bergamo.

A small selection :

- The reliquary of Saint Louis IX, king of France, is of special interest as a most elaborate example in Gothic style of an unknown French goldsmith at the end of the 13th century. It was a gift to this church by king Philip IV of France, following the canonization of Louis IX in 1297.
- The remains of a terracotta Pietà (1495) by the architect, painter and sculptor Baccio da Montelupo (mentioned by Vasari in his Vite)
- A polychromed terracotta Bust of Saint Dominic by Niccolò dell'Arca (1474)
- The remains of a fresco of Madonna with Child and Saint Dominic by an unknown Bolognese artist (possibly Cristoforo da Bologna) (second half of the 14th century), this fresco is known among engineers and scientists for the detailed pattern of the water flow wake near the St Cristopher's heels that likely has inspired Theodore Von Kármán in his studies
- Madonna of the Velvet, tempera on wood by Lippo Dalmasio (c. 1390)
- The Paschal Lamb, an oil painting on wood sometimes ascribed to Giorgio Vasari
- Madonna with Child, Saint Dominic and Vincenzo Ferreri (c. 1773), one of the best works of by Ubaldo Gandolfi (1728–1781)
- Several valuable intarsias by fra Damiano da Bergamo, such as The Story of San Girolomo, and geometrical figures.

== Convent and library (Biblioteca di San Domenico) ==
The square-shaped convent next door is also worth visiting for its cloisters (14th, 15th and 16th centuries) with various tombstones and memorial tablets in its walls. The convent was confiscated by the state in 1866 and served as a military hospital during WWII. The gradual recovery of the premises made it possible to transfer young religious who were preparing for religious life to the convent of S. Domenico, which in 1962 was aggregated to the Theological Faculty of the Pontifical University of St. Thomas Aquinas.

The chapter room displays a precious fresco of Saint Dominic from the 14th century. It is the oldest known image of the saint. On the ground floor of the old dormitory is St Dominic’s cell, so called because it is an original cell from his time and possibly the cell (or a similarly one) where he died. Some original letters of introduction and his canonization bull of 9 July 1234 are here on display. At the front of the library is a fresco Madonna with benedictory Child (by an unknown artist).

The three-aisled Renaissance library, the Biblioteca of San Domenico, planned like a basilica and built by Gaspare Nadi, dates back to 1469 and contains many precious books. Part of the library complex is now the seat of the faculty of philosophy and theology, run by the Dominicans. Another part is used as a conference room with a wooden-paneled coffered ceiling. At its end hangs the Baroque painting Ecstasy of St. Thomas Aquinas by Marcantonio Franceschini.

== Other burials ==
- Guido Reni, in the Rosary Chapel
- Elisabetta Sirani, also in the Rosary Chapel
- James of Ulm
- Enzio of Sardinia

== References and sources ==
Sources

- Alce, Venturino. The Basilica of Saint-Dominic in Bologna. Studio Domenicano. ISBN 88-7094-298-8.
- Museo della Basilica di S. Domenico. Bologna: Tipoarte. 1997.
- Giubelli, Giorgio. Illustrated Tourist Guide of Bologna.
- Bologna, Monumental Art Guide. Bologna: Italcards. ISBN 88-7193-622-1.
- Gianluigi Viscione, Inventare un monumento per San Domenico a Bologna: L’Arca di Nicola Pisano e i suoi sostegni. Nuove possibilità sulla sua prima conformazione, in «STUDI DI STORIA DELL'ARTE», 2025, 36, pp. 51-74.
