= Anna Maria Crescimbeni =

Italian painter (1772–1863)

- Anna Maria Crescimbeni
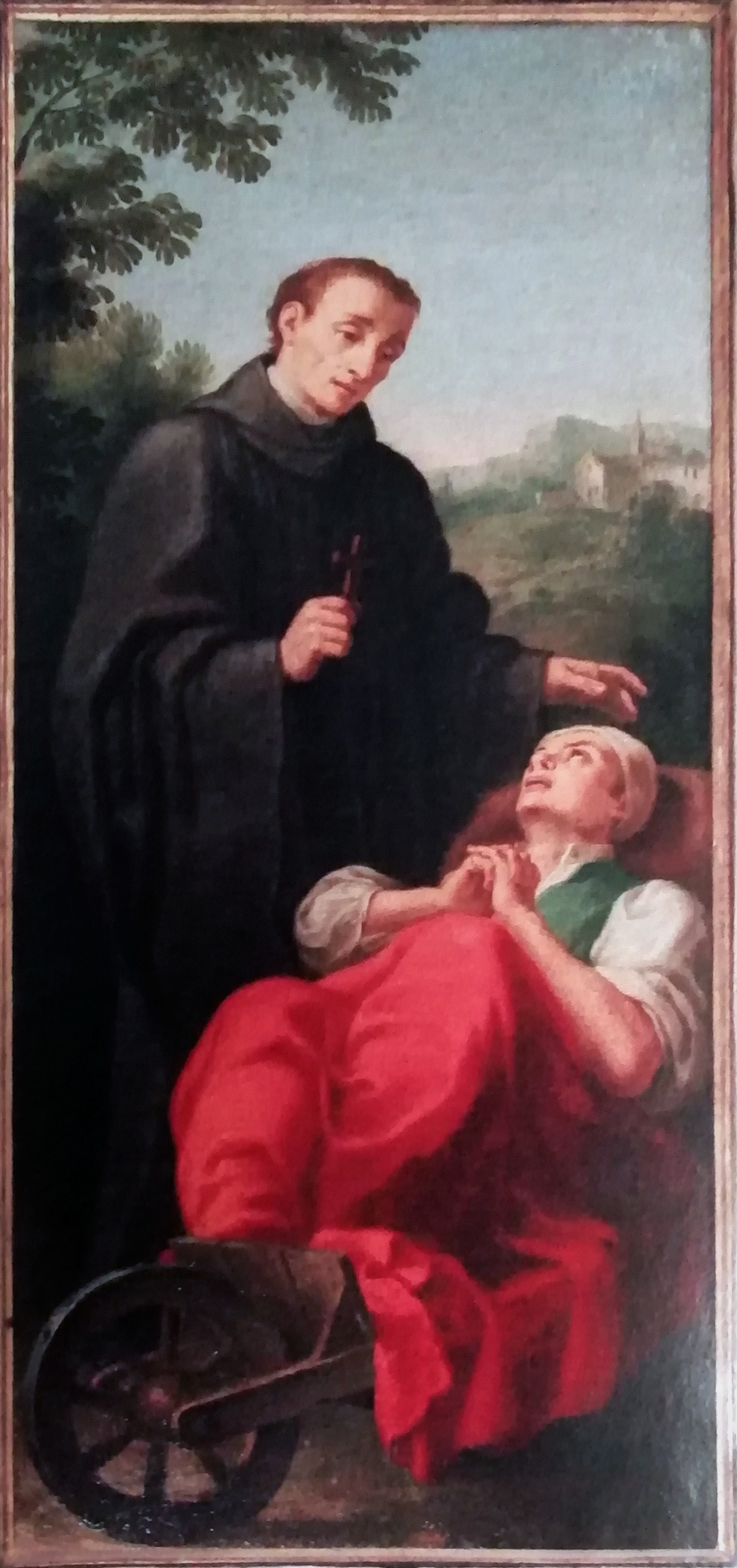
- St Maurus Abbot heals a sick woman
- Born: November 22, 1772; Bologna
- Died: February 25, 1863 (aged 90); Bologna
- Father: Angelo Crescimbeni

Anna Maria Crescimbeni (November 22, 1772 – February 25, 1863) was an Italian painter based in Bologna.

Largely forgotten, she was among the first women to be admitted as an honorary member of the Accademia di Belle Arti di Bologna. Like other of her colleagues, she was rediscovered in the 2010s.

== Early life and education ==
Anna Maria Grazia Crescimbeni was born on November 22, 1772 in Bologna, Italy. She was the daughter of the painter Angelo Crescimbeni, who died when she was 9 years old.

Presumably due to her father's influence in the art world, in 1793 circa she was admitted as a pupil in the atelier of Jacopo Alessandro Calvi, with whom she would maintain a strong bond all her life.

Still a 27 years old amateur, nominated by Gregorio Casali and Giuseppe Valiani, the 3 August 1799 she was accepted as an honorary member of the Accademia Clementina, a position that she may have lost for reasons that are unclear. She was reinstated in 1824, when she was already a professional painter under the Papal State, as confirmed by a document that lists her as an honorary member of the Accademia Pontificia di Belle Arti di Bologna.

== Career ==
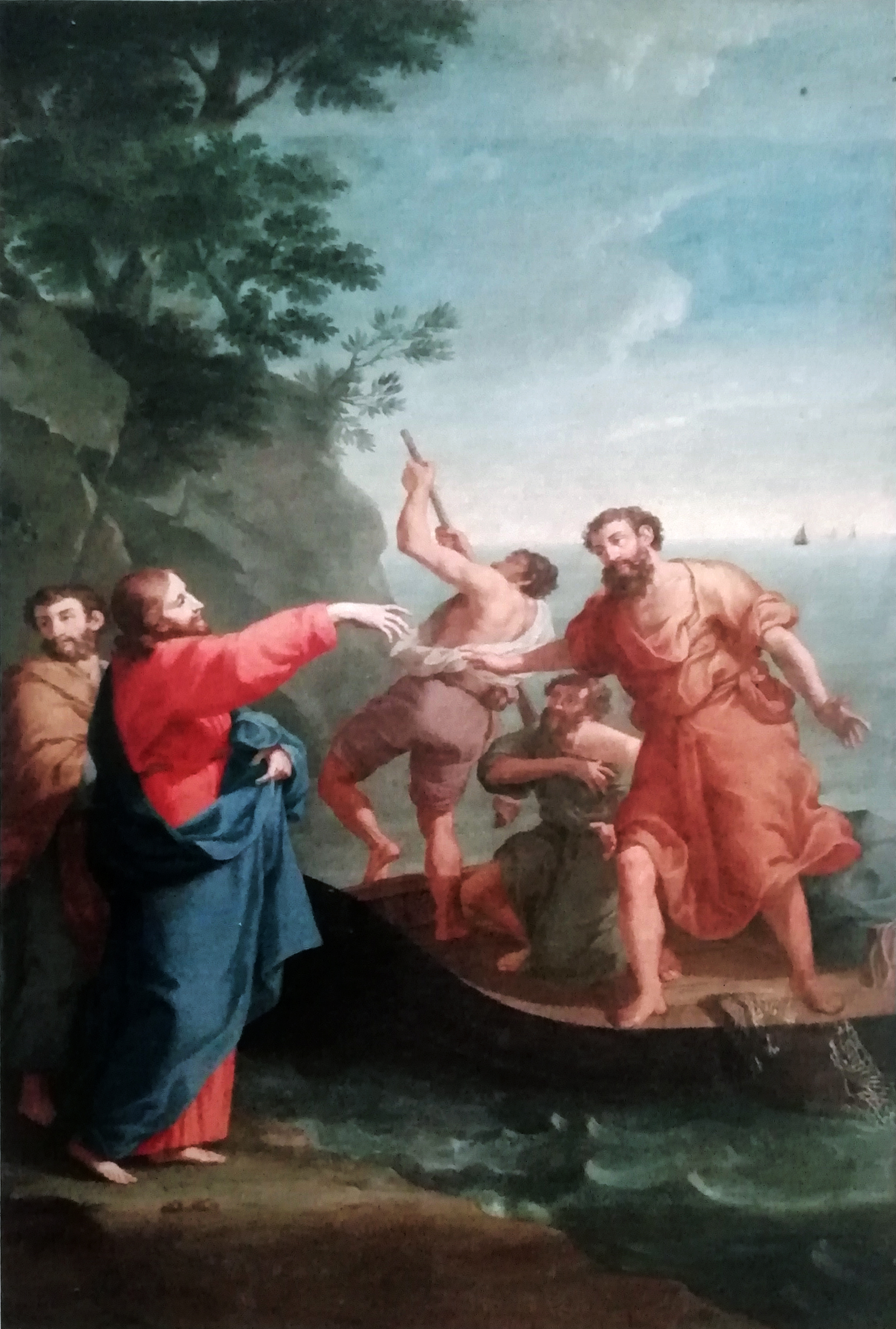
St Andrew's vocation to the Apostolate, St. Andrew church in Castel Maggiore, Italy.

She painted religious paintings, mostly oils on canvas for churches in Bologna and Northern Italy. Her patrons included religious institutions such as the Congregazione di San Luigi Gonzaga, and some influential noble families, members of the Bolognese Senate, such as Bentivoglio (a painting of the Beata Elena dall'Oglio) and Marescalchi families (for a painting exhibed at the Gallery of the Count Ferdinando Marescalchi).

Occasionally, she painted also mythological subjects for her commissioners of London.

Also a restorer, in 1825 she applied to the Accademia for permission to exercise this profession, probably to increase her income.

In 1830 she is at the top of her career when Gaetano Giordani write about her in the book Notizie delle donne pittrici di Bologna.

== Death and legacy ==
She never married and she worked until late in life: she restored a painting by Garofalini when she was 70 years old on behalf of the Marquis Virgilio Davia. She lived for a long time in Palazzo Benati in Castiglione street, her sister's residence, but in 1854, at the death of Teresa, the painter needed to leave the place. A difficult period began for Maria Crescimbeni: she was in poor health and lost her sight. Her last residence was in a modest flat in Fondazza street, Bologna. Anna Maria Crescimbeni died in 1863 in Bologna.

== Works ==
Works currently available in Italy:

- St. Anne, St. Joachim and the Virgin Child (Sant'Anna, San Gioacchino e la Vergine bambina), San Giovanni Battista dei Celestini, Bologna, c. 1832.
- St Maurus Abbot heals a sick woman (San Mauro abate risana un'inferma), Santa Maria dei Servi church, Bologna, before 1845.
- St. Camillus de' Lellis (San Camillo de' Lellis), at the chapel of music, Santa Maria dei Servi church, Bologna, before 1845.
- Death of St. Andrew Avellino (Morte di Sant'Andrea Avellino), at the chapel of music, Santa Maria dei Servi church, Bologna, before 1845.
- Saints Luigi Gonzaga, Francesco Saverio, Ignatius of Loyola (SS. Luigi Gonzaga, Francesco Saverio, Ignazio di Loyola), oil on canvas, St. Isaiah Church, Bologna, before 1845.
- St Andrew's vocation to the Apostolate (Vocazione di Sant'Andrea all'apostolato), St. Andrew church in Castel Maggiore, Bologna, before 1832; an earlier source attributes the painting to Carlotta Gargalli
- Via Crucis, San Mamante church, Lovoleto, Granarolo dell'Emilia, oil on canvas, c. 1793; the Lamentation is inspired by Annibale Carracci's Pietà in the Museo di Capodimonte, Napoli.
- Madonna with Child (La Madonna e il Bambino), San Mamante church, Lovoleto, Granarolo dell'Emilia, before 1815. (in collaboration with Calvi)
- SS. Luigi Gonzaga, Carlo Borromeo, Ponziano Papa martire, Antonio Abate e Antonio da Padova, San Mamante church, Lovoleto, Granarolo dell'Emilia.
- Assumption of Mary (S. Maria Assunta in Cielo), oil on canvas, Assumption of Mary church in Merlano, Valsamoggia, between 1832 and 1851

Lost or unidentified works:

- Portrait of Jacopo Calvi, 1815?
- Oreste perseguitato dalle furie, before 1832.
- Ritratto di un beato cappuccino, oil on canvas, before 1845.
- Beata Vergine degli infermi , St. Martin church in Pedriolo, Castel San Pietro, Bologna, before 1844.
- unidentified work, San Paolo Maggiore church, Bologna before 1839.
- unidentified work, San Giorgio in Poggiale church, Bologna.

== See also ==
- Women Artists
- List of Italian women artists

== Bibliography ==
- Bohn, Babette (2021). Women artists, their patrons, and their publics in early modern Bologna. University Park, Pennsylvania: The Pennsylvania State University Press. ISBN 978-0-271-08696-5.
- Chia, Ilaria; Tamarri, Giovanni (2013). Pittrici bolognesi : Donne e professioniste nel primo Ottocento : Carlotta Gargalli, Anna Mignani, Maria Crescimbeni (in Italian) (1st ed.). Bologna: Tipografia Azeta Print Service. pp. 84–121. OCLC 963852300.
- Giordani, Gaetano (1832). Notizie delle donne pittrici di Bologna (in Italian). Bologna: Tipografia Nobili e Co. OCLC 886314666.
- Bianconi, Girolamo (1844). Guida del forestiere per la città di Bologna e suoi sobborghi (in Italian). Tip. di S. Tommaso d'Aquino. pp. 54, 80, 126, 226.
- Ricci, Corrado (1882). Guida di Bologna (in Italian). Bologna: N. Zanichelli. pp. 78, 170, 191, 217. OCLC 42915665. OL 33171056M.
