= Giovanni Breviglieri =

Italian painter (died 1755)

Giovanni Breviglieri (18th century, died 1755) was an Italian painter, active in Bologna (then in the Papal States) painting history and sacred subjects. It is notable that biographers refer to the painter as dying with odor of sanctity or in a concept of piety (concetto di Pieta), underscoring a reputation as a blessed man.

== Biography ==
He is said to have been a pupil of Felice Torelli in Bologna. Among his works, he painted a Santa Teresa di Gesù and a St Anthony of Padua for the Chapel of St Joseph in the Basilica of San Domenico, Bologna. He also painted the Adoration of the Shepherds for the church of Santa Croce, in the complex of Santo Stefano, Bologna.
