= Antonia Bertucci-Pinelli =

Italian artist (died c. 1640)

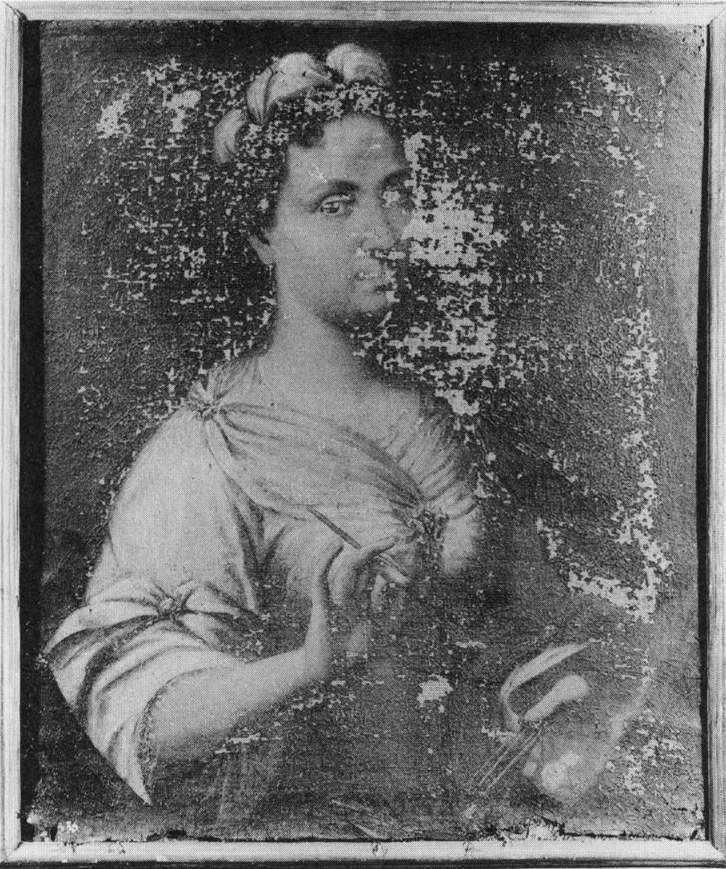
Photo portrait of Antonia Bertucci-Pinelli

Antonia Bertucci-Pinelli (died 1644) was an Italian painter of the Baroque period. She was born in Bologna, and was instructed in art by Lodovico Carracci. She painted some pictures for the churches; among others, the Guardian Angel for San Tommaso; and St Philip & St. James for the church dedicated to those saints. But her most celebrated work was a St. John the Evangelist for the Annunziata, painted from a design of Lodovico Carracci. Her maiden name was Pinelli, but she married Giovanni Battista Bertusio.
