= Giovanni Battista Bertusio =

Italian painter (1577–1644)

- Born: Giovanni Battista Bertusio ca. 1577; Bologna, Italy
- Died: ca. 1644
- Occupation: Painter
- Movement: Early-Baroque
- Spouse: Antonia Pinelli

Giovanni Battista Bertusio (also spelled Bertucci or Bertuzzi; c. 1577– c. 1644) was a painter of the early-Baroque period, active in Bologna. He trained initially under Denys Calvaert, then under Ludovico and Agostino Carracci. He married the painter Antonia Pinelli.

== Life and work ==
He was born in Bologna on 20 May 1577: there is little information about his training and his career as an artist. His main biographer is Carlo Cesare Malvasia, who, after telling that Bertusio was a pupil of Denis Calvaert, mentioned his training under Agostino Carracci. Bertusio also imitated the art of Guido Reni with unequal forces. The same source informs us that in 1602 he was chosen to read the funeral oration written by Faberio in the death of Agostino Carracci, for "a certain natural eloquence", a quality that certainly favours him in the teaching of painting. He had a reputation and fame with "all the knights of those times".

All the paintings that can be referred to Bertusio are preserved in the churches of Bologna; and among them are the two canvases on the side walls of the Belvisia chapel in St. Paolo Maggiore with the Birth of the Virgin and the Presentation of the Virgin to the Temple. These canvases probably document his earliest activity. But his picture of greater commitment, probably painted around 1630, is the Resurrection of Christ in the church of St. Cristina, where the artist takes advantage of some remembrance of the small Resurrection of young Reni in St. Domenico, but where an incipient adherence to the style of Albani prevails in the figure of Christ.

His other works, still in Bologna, are:

- The Death of St. Giuliana in St. Stefano;
- St. Tommaso d'Aquino in St. Domenico;
- Tobia and the Angel in St. Michele Arcangelo;
- The Madonna del Rosario and Saints in St. Agnese;
- An oval with St. Onofrio in the Oratory of Santa Maria Maddalena;
- The Death of the Blessed Fasano in the Oratory of Santa Maria della Vita;
- Various paintings within the stucco adornments in the chapel of the Compagnia dei Salaroli in Santa Maria della Pietà;
- The Madonna and Child with St. Giovannino in the Pinacoteca of the church of Corpus Domini.

Alongside these famous works, Carlo Cesare Malvasia remembered others in private houses and "in the countryside and in the villages".

Giovanni Bertusio died in Bologna on 23 July 1644.

== Sources ==
- Ticozzi, Stefano (1830). Dizionario degli architetti, scultori, pittori, intagliatori in rame ed in pietra, coniatori di medaglie, musaicisti, niellatori, intarsiatori d'ogni etá e d'ogni nazione' (Volume 1). Milan: Gaetano Schiepatti. p. 156.
