= Giulio Spisanelli =

Italian painter

Giulio Spisanelli (died 1658) was an Italian painter of the Baroque period, active mainly in Bologna, his birthplace. He first trained under his father Vincenzo Spisanelli, then under Domenico Maria Canuti. He traveled to Rome at Vincenzo's instigation and died soon after returning.
