= Gaspare Nadi =

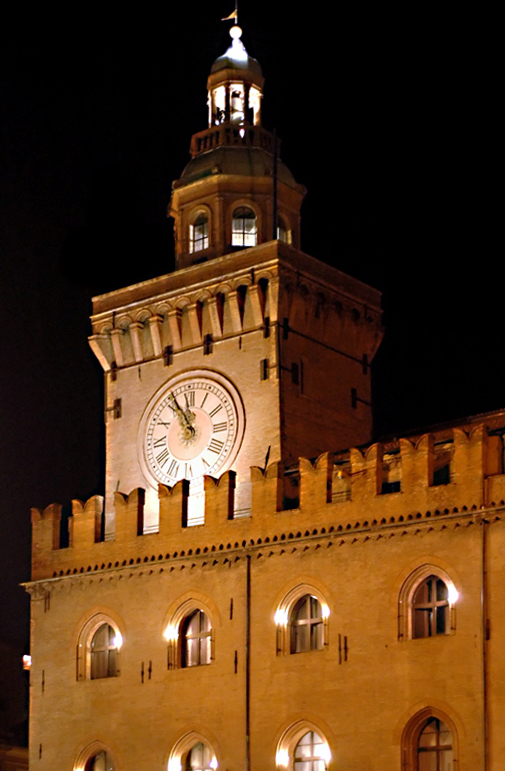
Belltower of the Palazzo d'Accursio

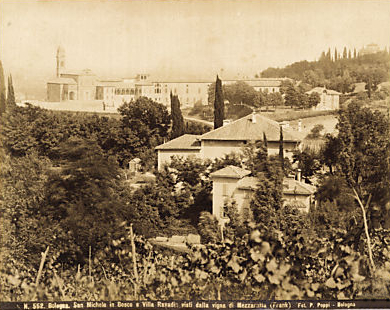
San Michele in Bosco complex

Gaspare Nadi or Guasparo di Nadi (2 November 1418 – 9 January 1504) was an Italian builder famous for his diary (diario). He was mistaken by later historians for an architect. He built, but did not design, the library of the Basilica of San Domenico.

Nadi was born in a house on the Via dei Pelacani (now Via G. Petroni) in the parish of San Vitale in Bologna. His father, Filippo di Domenico, was a tanner who died in 1427. That same year his mother, Chiara, remarried to Giacomo Senzabarba, a shoemaker. At the age of fifteen Nadi moved to Faenza in the following of the jurist Graziolo Accarisi, but two years later he returned to Bologna. Senzabarba refused to maintain him there and so within months he had moved into the house of Gaspare di Guido, where he was taught to read and write under a private instructor. In 1436 he began learning to work with wool and then apprenticed with a barber, but since his mother could not afford his training, he moved into masonry—arte del muro, the art of the wall—and found work with the master builder Bartolomeo Negri.

Nadi's first work was the installation of the bell of the Palazzo d'Accursio (with the engineer Aristotele Fioravanti), completed, he proudly noted in his diary, on 16 May 1436. In July he joined the master builder Cristoforo Zani, and worked on the church of San Michele in Bosco. In 1440 he went to Ferrara to complete his training under Pietrobono Brasavola, the chief engineer of Niccolò III d'Este, Marquis of Ferrara. He worked on the reliquary (arca) of the church of Santa Maria degli Angeli, construction on which was never complete owing to the destruction wrought by the earthquake of 1570.

In 1442 Nadi returned to Bologna, to his stepfather's house in the parish of San Mamolo. In 1444 he married Catelina di Antonio di Bernardo, the daughter of a tailor from Florence, and in 1445 he moved to Prato to live with his in-laws. In 1450 his mother died and Nadi entered the company of masons of Prato. Around this time he had his first child, Filippo. During his time in Tuscany he was involved in a physical fight while trying to avenge a slight against his father.

In 1452 Nadi returned to Bologna once more and began keeping his famous diario. In 1456 he entered the local masons' guild. He served his first of many terms as guild manager (massaro) in 1459. He also served once each as syndic (sindaco) and auditor (revisore). Around this time he had another son, Gianfrancesco, and a daughter, Maria. In total his wife bore him six children and had six abortions before her death in 1462. He then remarried to Francesca, who bore him a daughter, Bernardina, and a son, Girolamo, the only one of his children to learn their father's trade. In 1467 his eldest son and second wife died during an outbreak of plague. He married for a third time to Caterina, who had two children from a prior marriage. His third marriage was not a happy one, and he expressed sorrow in his diary when his wife joined him in Lombardy in 1480. After the death of Girolamo, relations with Caterina soured further and Nadi often slept in his shop with his employees.

Nadi continued to quarrel with his stepchildren and in 1503, after selling the house, he moved in with his son Giovanni. The date of his death is recorded in the diary of a certain Tommaso di Gerardo Alessandrini, perhaps a fellow mason. Nadi was buried "with the great honour of the company of masons" (con grande onore de la conpagnia di moraduri) in the church of San Vitale in the place of his birth.

== Sources ==
- Quaquarelli, Leonardo. (2012). "Nadi, Gaspare". Dizionario Biografico degli Italiani 77. Rome: Istituto dell'Enciclopedia Italiana.
