= Bartolomeo Cesi =

Italian painter

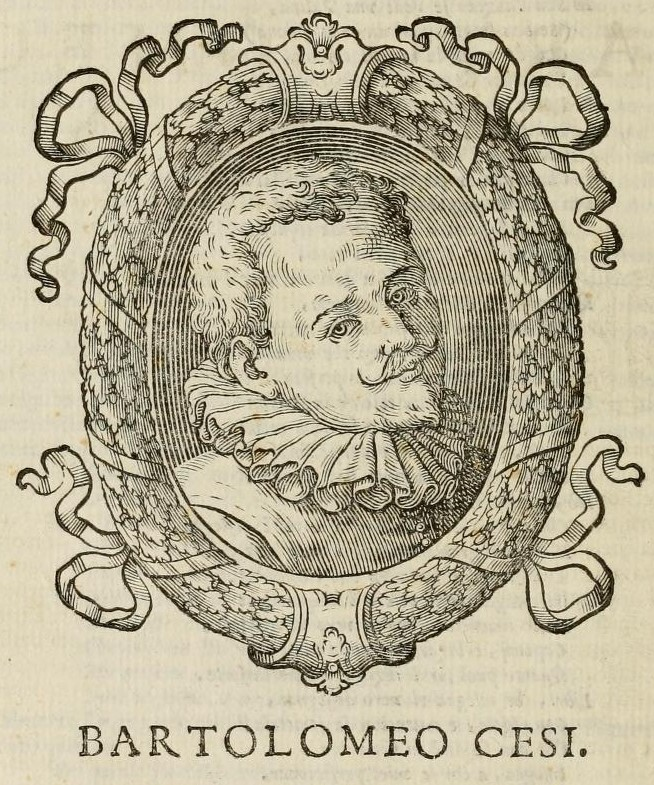
- Born: 1556; Bologna, Papal States
- Died: 1629 (aged 72–73); Bologna, Papal States
- Known for: Painting

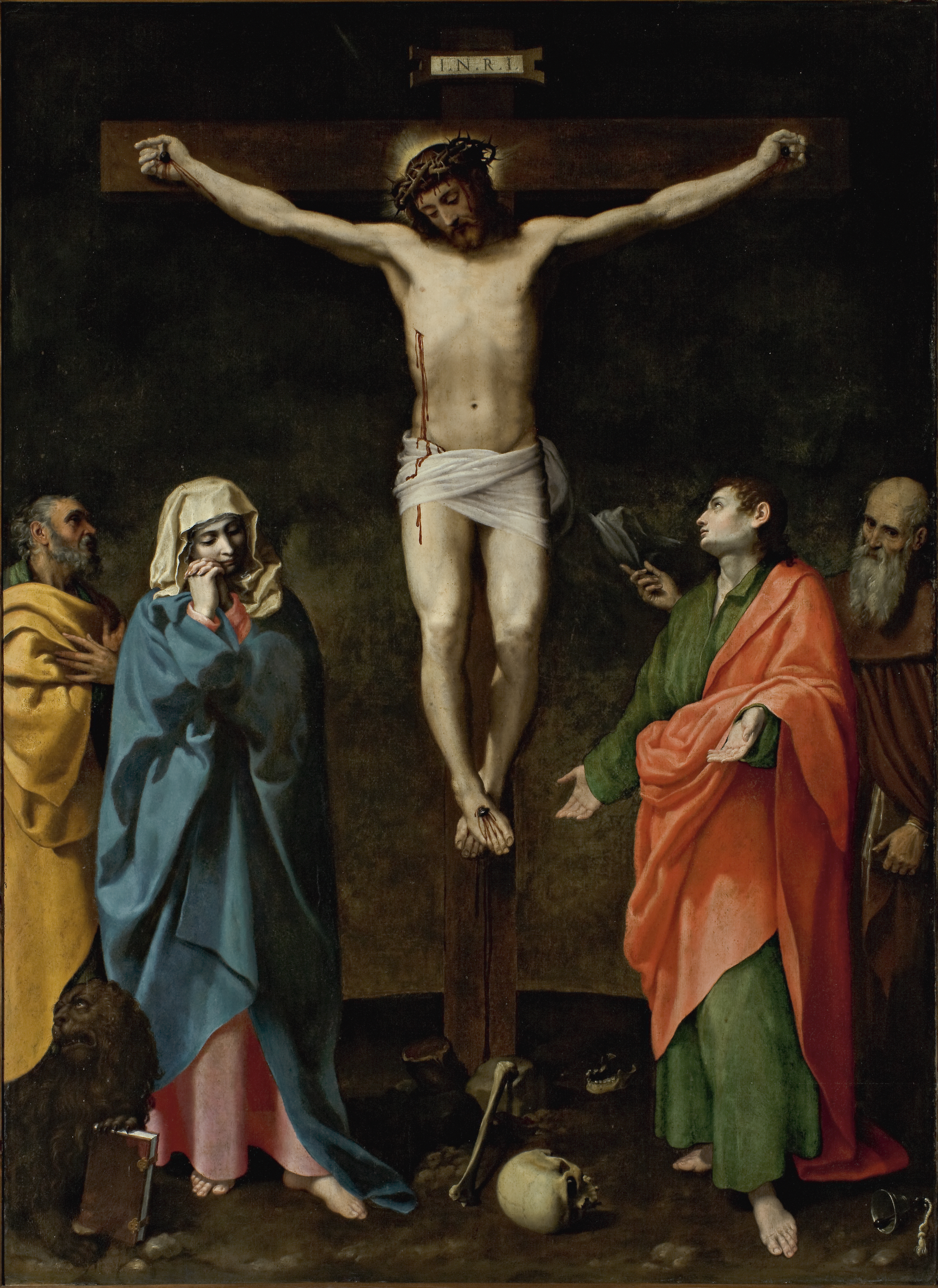
Crucifixion with saints

Bartolomeo Cesi (Italian: [bartoloˈmɛːo ˈtʃɛːzi]; 16 August 1556 – 11 July 1629) was an Italian painter and draftsman of the Bolognese School. He made easel paintings as well as frescoes. He is known mainly for his religious paintings but he also painted portraits and mythological scenes.

== Life ==
He was born to a wealthy family of Bologna. He first received a humanist education and later studied painting under Giovanni Francesco Bezzo. In Bologna, he contributed works to the Duomo, San Procolo, and Santo Stefano. He collaborated with Ludovico Carracci and Prospero Fontana on some projects. His pious sobriety was influenced by his friendship with Cardinal Gabriele Paleotti of Bologna, who had attended the Council of Trent. His biography is contained in Carlo Cesare Malvasia's Felsina Pittrice.

He traveled to Rome and worked there with Scipione Pulzone. After his return in 1591, one of his project was a series of frescoes on the Passion of Christ for the Carthusian Monastery (Charterhouse) or San Girolamo in Bologna. In 1595, Cesi completed the triptych including the 'Adoration of the Magi and Virgin and Saints for the Basilica of San Domenico in Bologna.

Together with his contemporary Lodovico Carracci, Cesi campaigned successfully to create a guild of painters in Bologna in 1599. Cesi's last years were less productive, but he became the drawing master of the Accademia degli Ardenti in 1620.

Alessandro Tiarini was his pupil.

== Work ==
He made easel paintings as well as frescoes. He is known mainly for his religious paintings but is also known to have painted portraits.

Cesi was inspired by the Counter Reformation's interest in education and the use of art as a vehicle for renewing faith and promoting the Roman Catholic creed. Three versions of a Crucifixion with saints (1585–1600) of which one made for an altar in the church San Martino, Bologna, show his mature style: sober mood and intellectual and abstract composition and naturalistic figures. They reflect his interest in making designs based on his studies from life.

== Passion Cycle by Cesi at Certosa di San Girolamo of Bologna ==
Passion Cycle by Cesi at Certosa di San Girolamo of Bologna

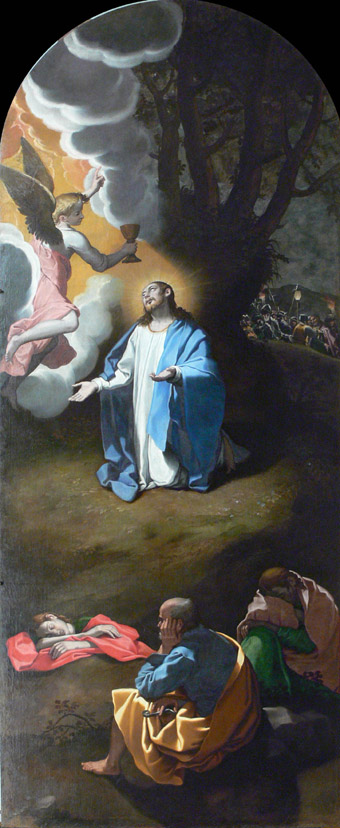
Gesthemane

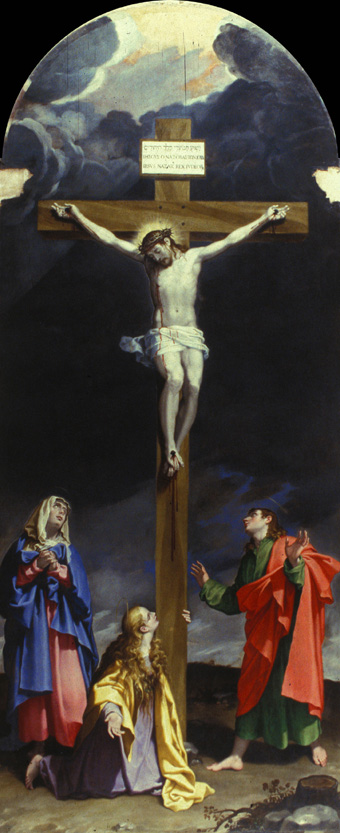
Crucifixion

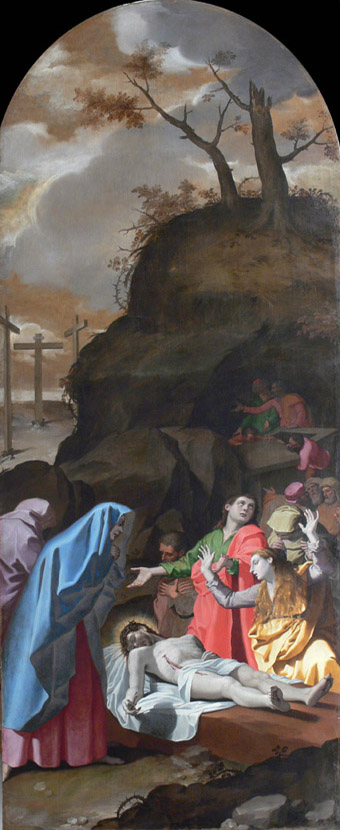
Deposition
