= Vincenzo Spisanelli =

Italian painter

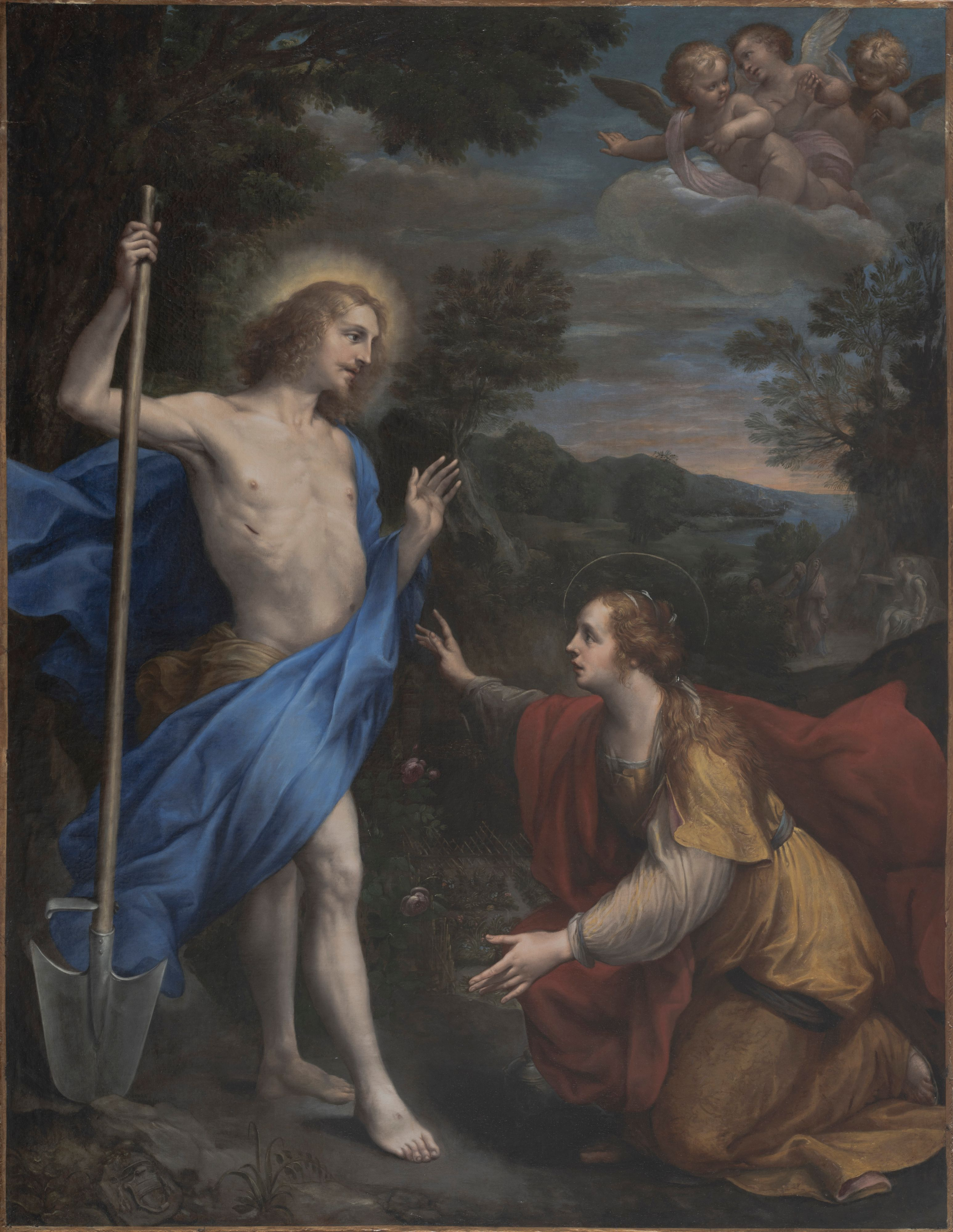
Noli Me Tangere

Vincenzo Spisanelli (1595–1662) was an Italian painter of the Baroque period, active mainly in Bologna. He is also called Lo Spisanelli or Pisanelli, Spisano, or Spisani.

== life ==
Spisanelli was born at Orta San Giulio, Piedmont. He was a pupil of the Flemish painter Denis Calvaert in Bologna, but was also active in Ferrara, Imola, Modena, and in Lombardy.

He survived the plague of 1630, unlike his wife. He was affected by the tragedy and suffered from melancholy for the remainder of his life.

His only son, the painter Giulio Pisanelli, died a few years before his father. Spisanelli died at Bologna in 1662.

== Work ==
He was prolific in the painting of altarpieces.
