= Giovanni Andrea Donducci =

Italian painter

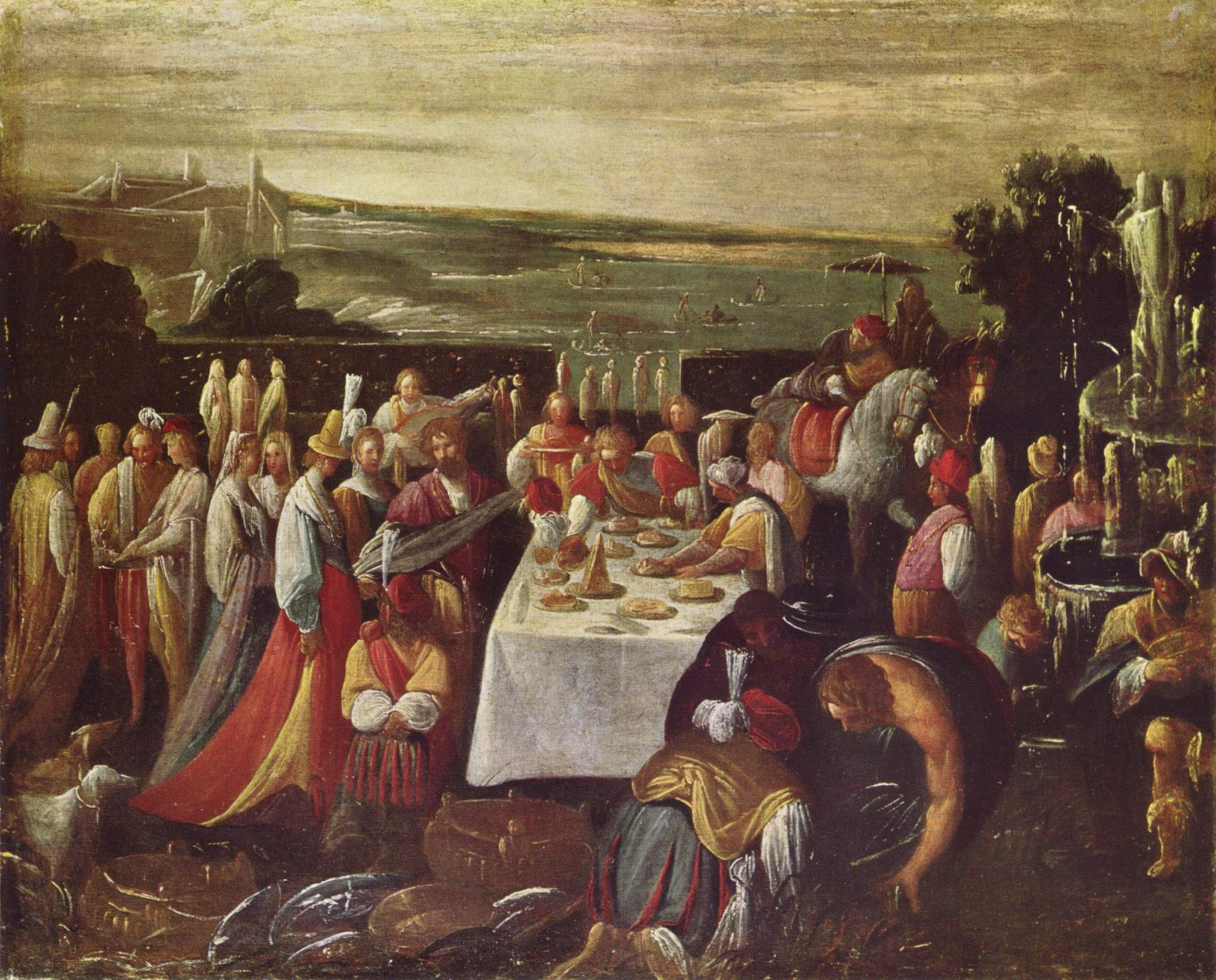
- Mastelletta, Guests Eat at the Lakeshore, Galleria Nazionale d'Arte Antica, 1580
- Born: 14 February 1575; Bologna, Papal States
- Died: 25 March 1655 (aged 80); Bologna, Papal States
- Other name: Il Mastelletta
- Education: Carracci
- Known for: Painting
- Movement: late-Renaissance and Baroque

Giovanni Andrea Donducci (14 February 1575 – 25 April 1655), also known as Mastelletta, was an Italian Baroque painter of the Bolognese School (painting). Donducci belongs to the generation of Carracci – inspired or trained painters comprised by Giacomo Cavedone (1577–1660); Alessandro Tiarini (1577–1668), Lucio Massari, Lionello Spada (1576-1622), and Lorenzo Garbieri.

== Biography ==
Giovanni Andrea Donducci was born in Bologna on 14 February 1575. His father was a maker of vats (mastelli). He trained in the Carracci Academy degli Incamminati at about the time when Domenichino, Lucio Massari, and perhaps Albani were there. Art biographer Malvasia claims he befriended the Genoese Agostino Tassi while in Rome.

Between 1613 and 1614, he contributed to the decoration of the chapel of Saint Dominic in the Basilica of San Domenico in Bologna. On the right side of the chapel The Miracle of the Forty Drowned (1613) and on the left side the canvas Resurrection of the young Napoleone Orsini (1614). He also frescoed the patron saints of Bologna on the pendentives of the dome: San Floriano, St. Francis, San Procolo and San Petronio.

Malvasia describes him by the late 1620s as increasingly neurotic and reclusive: “an enemy of his friends, suspicious of everyone, hating himself, in other words". His figures have an almost phantasmagoric Alessandro Magnasco-like fervor, not characteristic of Bolognese classicism. He is also painted elaborate landscapes to his paintings, likely an influence of Scarsellino's and/or Niccolò dell'Abbate's works.

== Anthology of works ==
- Jesus served by Angels (1615–17), Santa Maria di Galliera, Bologna;
- Charity of a Saint, Pinacoteca Nazionale di Bologna;
- Flight into Egypt, c. 1655, priv. coll.;
- The Last Supper, Museo della città di Rimini;
- John the Baptist Preaching in the Wilderness, priv. coll.;
- Rest on the Flight into Egypt, priv. coll.;
- The Finding of Moses, c. 1618, Palazzo dei Musei, Modena.
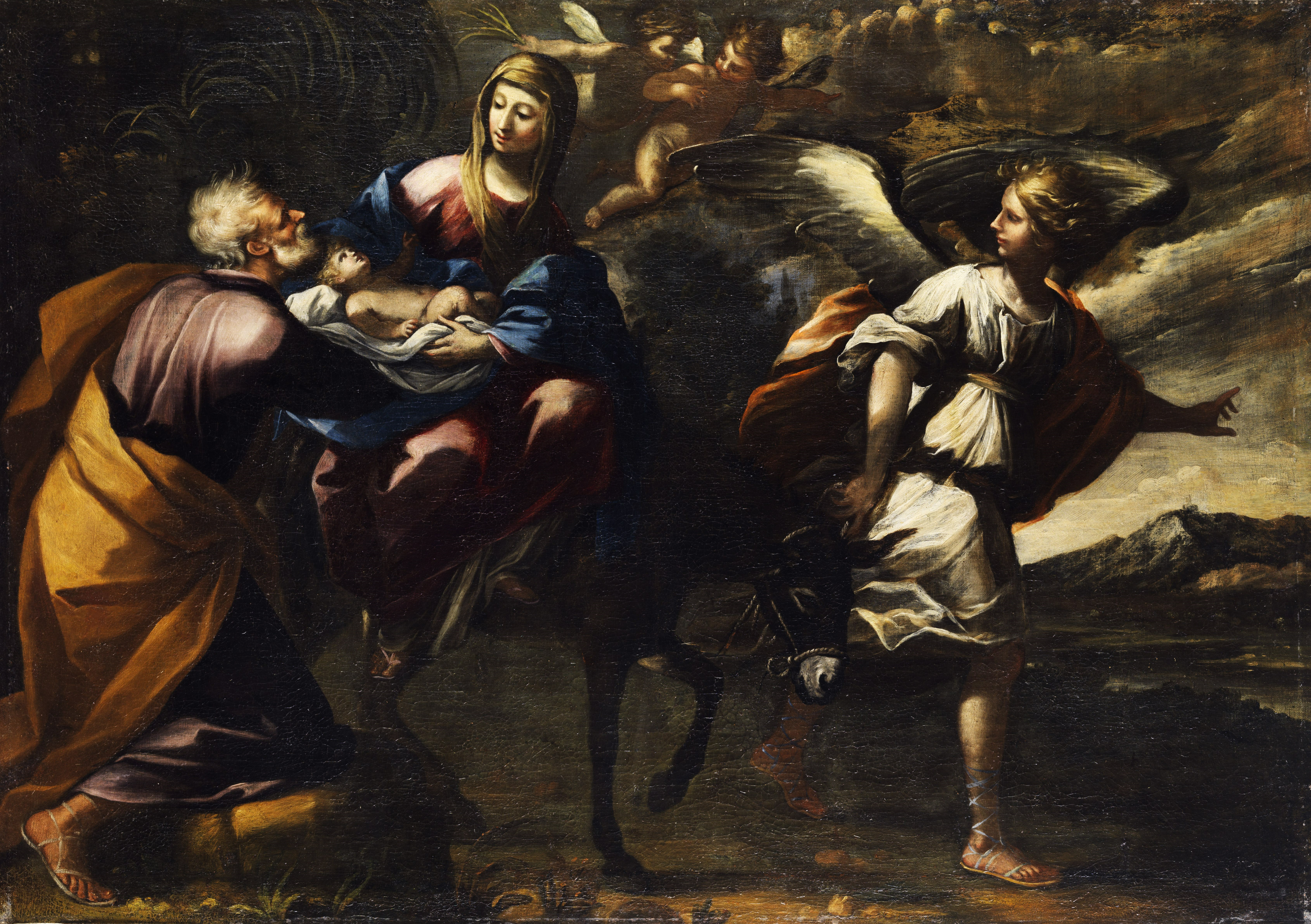
Flight into Egypt, c. 1655, priv. coll.

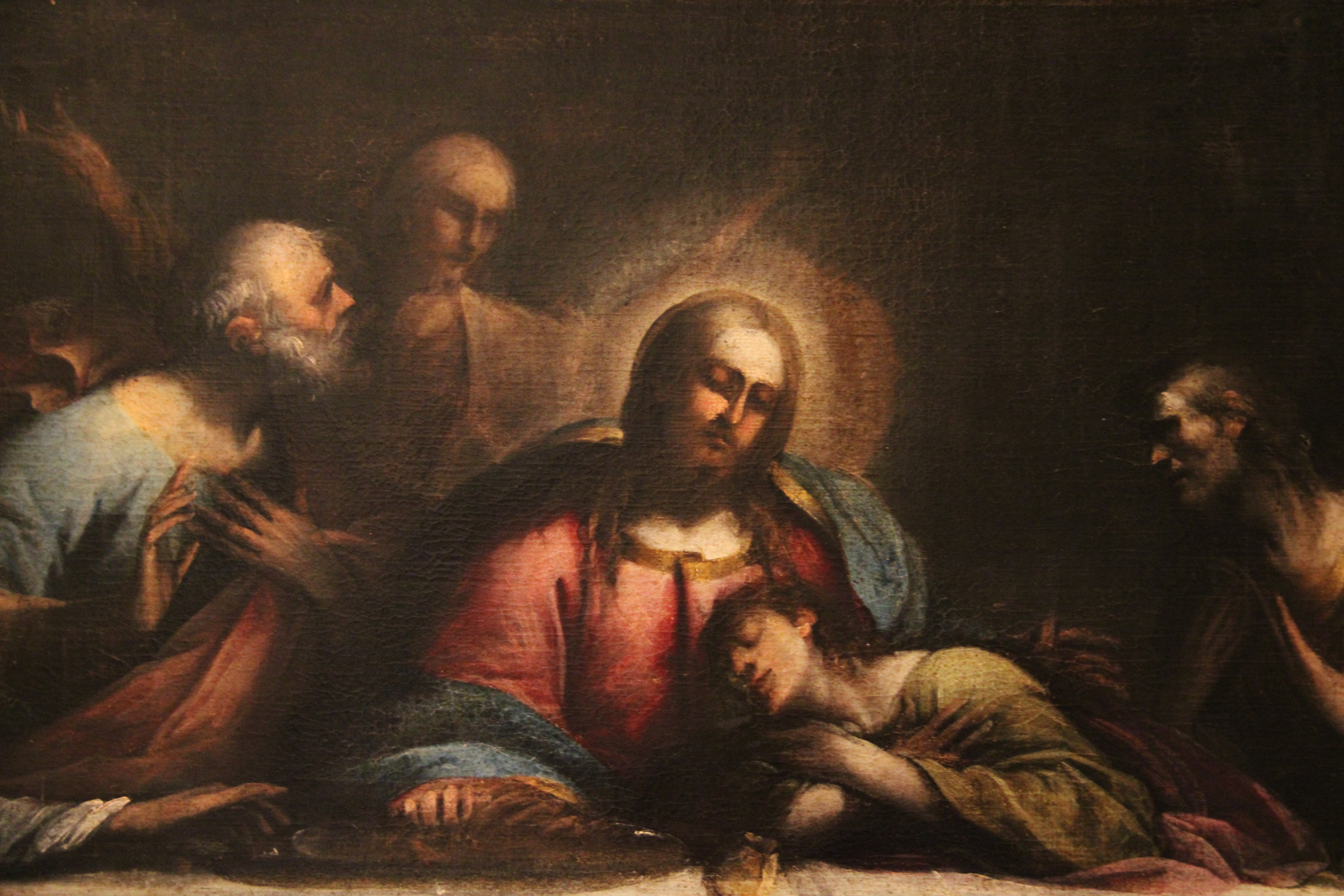
The Last Supper, Museo della città di Rimini

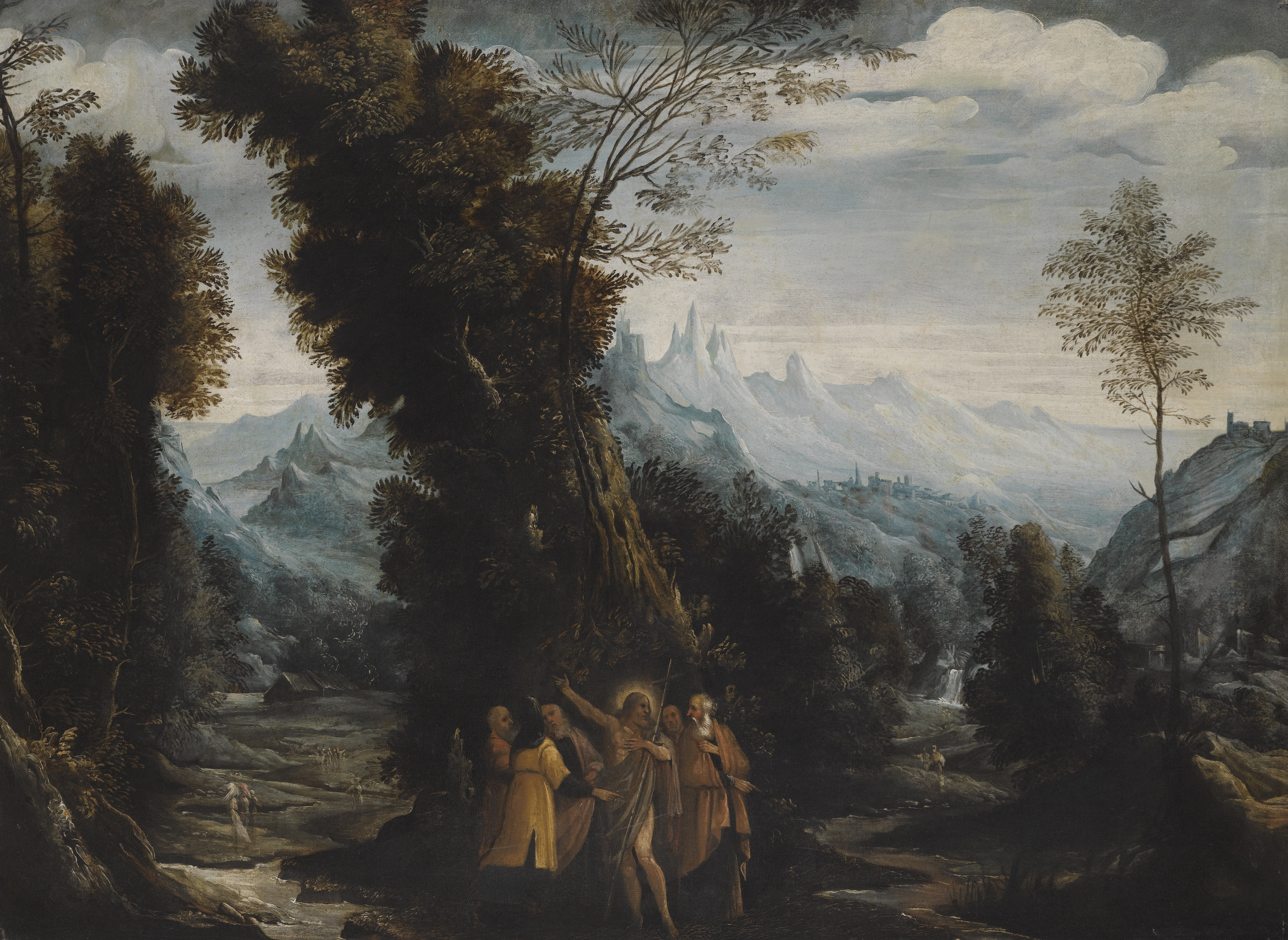
John the Baptist Preaching in the Wilderness, priv. coll.

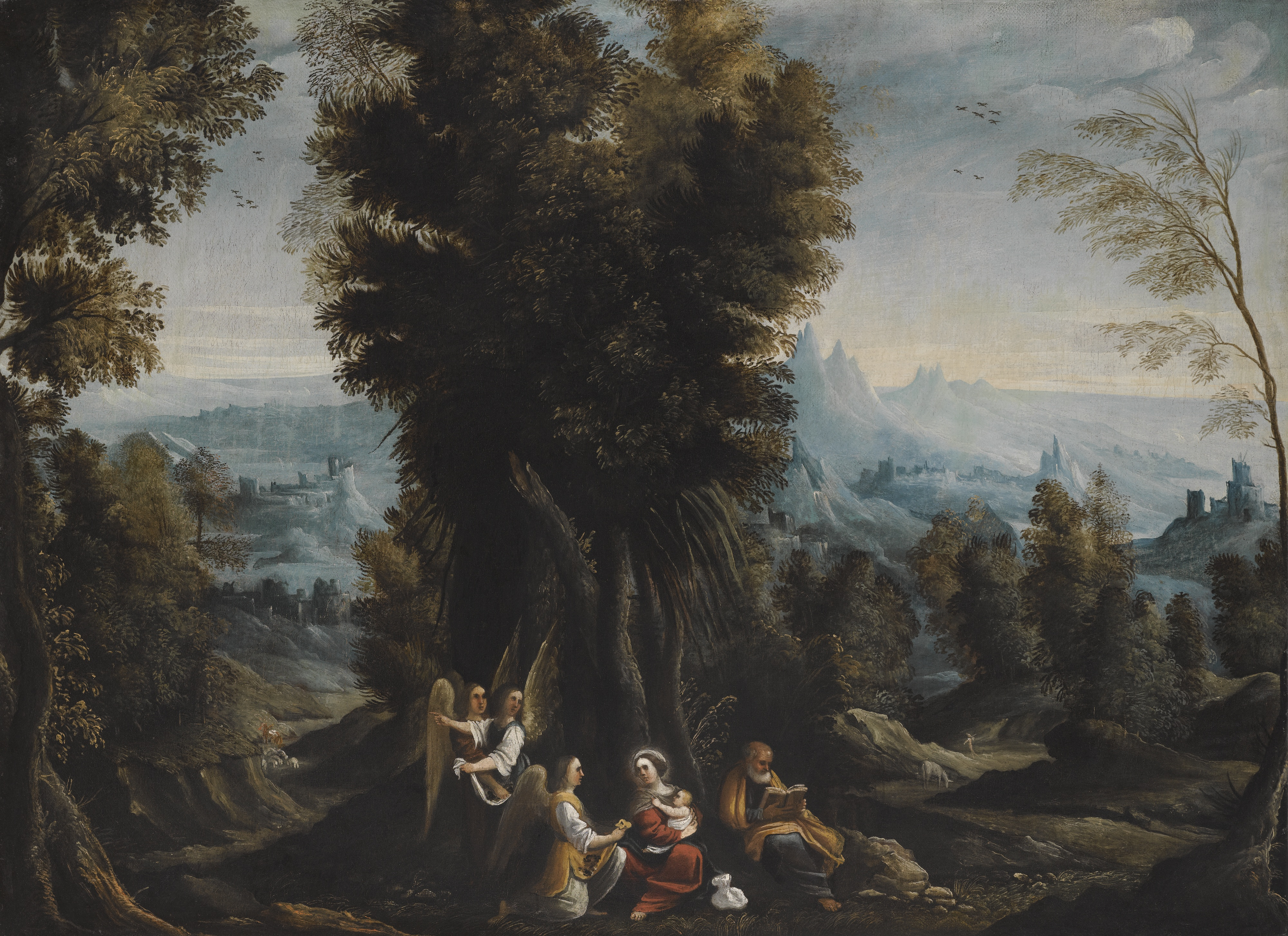
Rest on the Flight into Egypt, priv. coll.

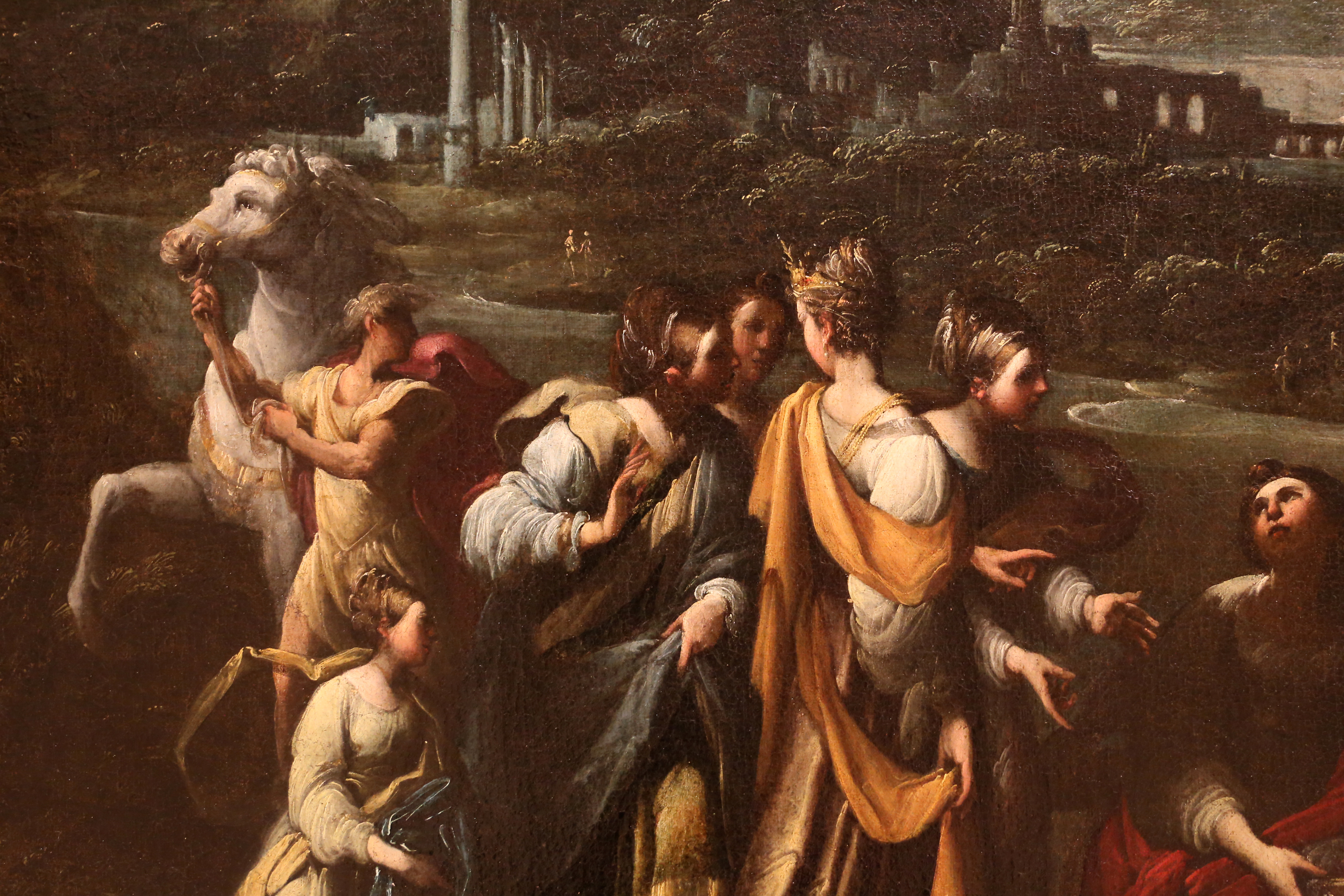
The Finding of Moses, c. 1618, Palazzo dei Musei, Modena

== Bibliography ==
- Francis P. Smyth; John P. O'Neill, eds. (1986). The Age of Correggio and the Carracci: Emilian Painting of the 16th and 17th Centuries. National Gallery of Art, Washington D.C. pp. 495–501.
- Wittkower, Rudolf (1993). "Art and Architecture Italy, 1600-1750". Pelican History of Art. 1980. Penguin Books Ltd. pp. 92–95.
