= Sistine Chapel ceiling =

Cycle of frescoes by Michelangelo

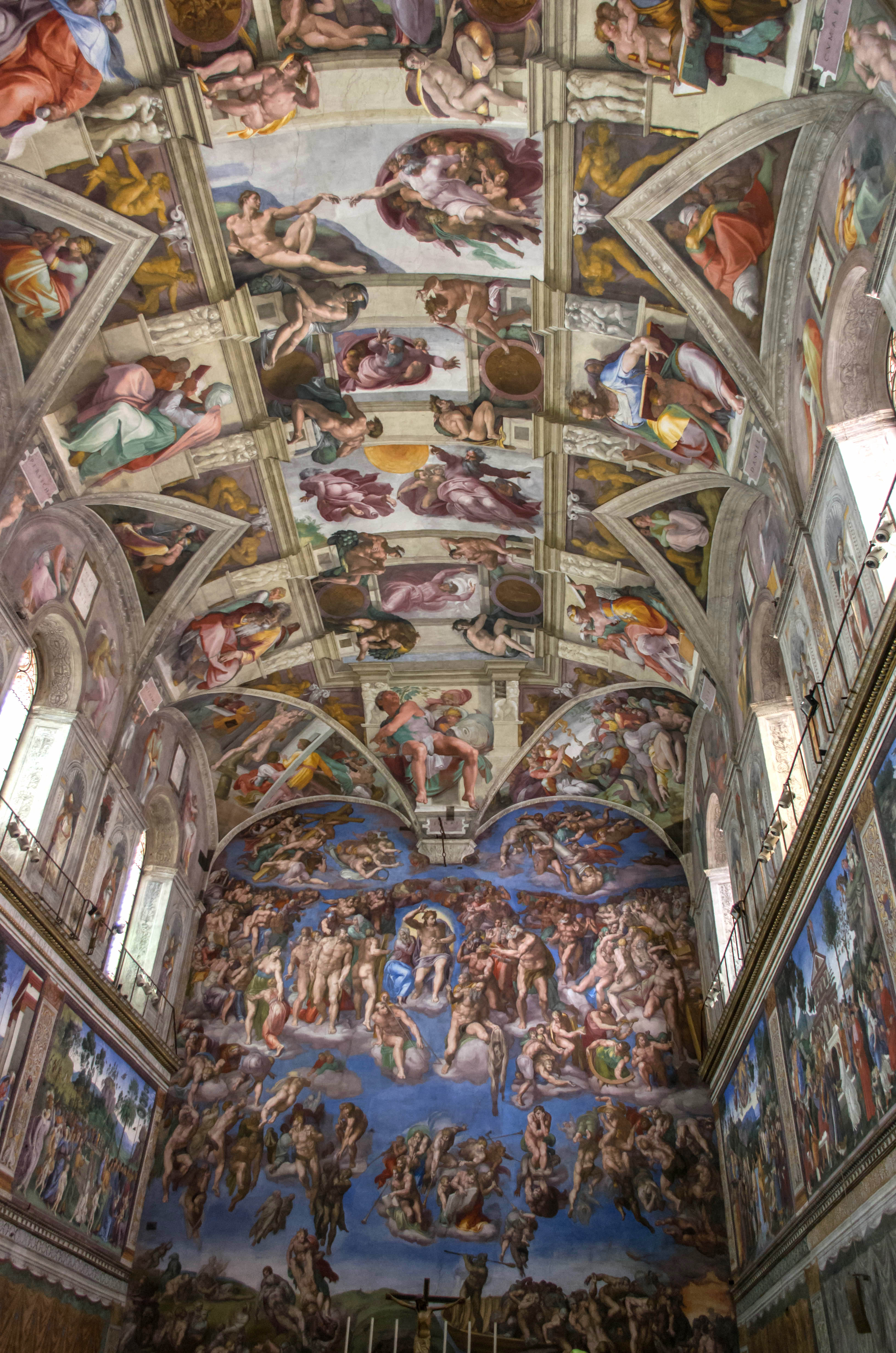
- The interior of the Sistine Chapel showing the ceiling in relation to the other frescoes. Michelangelo's The Creation of Adam is near the top of the photo.
- Click on the map for a fullscreen view
- Artist: Michelangelo
- Location: Sistine Chapel, part of Vatican Museums, Vatican City; 41°54′11″N 12°27′16″E
- Followed by: The Last Judgment

The Sistine Chapel ceiling (Italian: Soffitto della Cappella Sistina), painted in fresco by Michelangelo between 1508 and 1512, is a cornerstone work of High Renaissance art.

The Sistine Chapel is the large papal chapel built within the Vatican between 1477 and 1480 by Pope Sixtus IV, for whom the chapel is named. The ceiling was painted at the commission of Pope Julius II.

The ceiling's various painted elements form part of a larger scheme of decoration within the chapel. Prior to Michelangelo's contribution, the walls were painted by several leading artists of the late 15th century including Sandro Botticelli, Domenico Ghirlandaio, and Pietro Perugino. After the ceiling was painted, Raphael created a set of large tapestries (1515–1516) to cover the lower portion of the wall. Michelangelo returned to the chapel to create The Last Judgment, a large wall fresco situated behind the altar. The chapel's decoration illustrates much of the doctrine of the Catholic Church, serving as the setting for papal conclaves and many other important services.

Central to the ceiling decoration are nine scenes from the Book of Genesis, including The Creation of Adam. The complex design includes several sets of figures, some clothed and some nude, allowing Michelangelo to demonstrate his skill in depicting the human figure in a variety of poses. The ceiling was immediately well-received and imitated by other artists, continuing to the present. It has been restored several times, most recently from 1980 to 1994.

== Context and creation ==
The walls of the Sistine Chapel had been decorated 20 years before Michelangelo's work on the ceiling. Following this, Raphael designed a set of tapestries (1515–1516) to cover the lowest of three levels; the surviving tapestries are still hung on special occasions. The middle level contains a complex scheme of frescoes illustrating the Life of Christ on the right side and the Life of Moses on the left side. It was carried out by some of the most renowned Renaissance painters: Sandro Botticelli, Domenico Ghirlandaio, Pietro Perugino, Pinturicchio, Luca Signorelli, and Cosimo Rosselli. The upper level of the walls contains the windows, between which are painted pairs of illusionistic niches with representations of the first 32 popes.

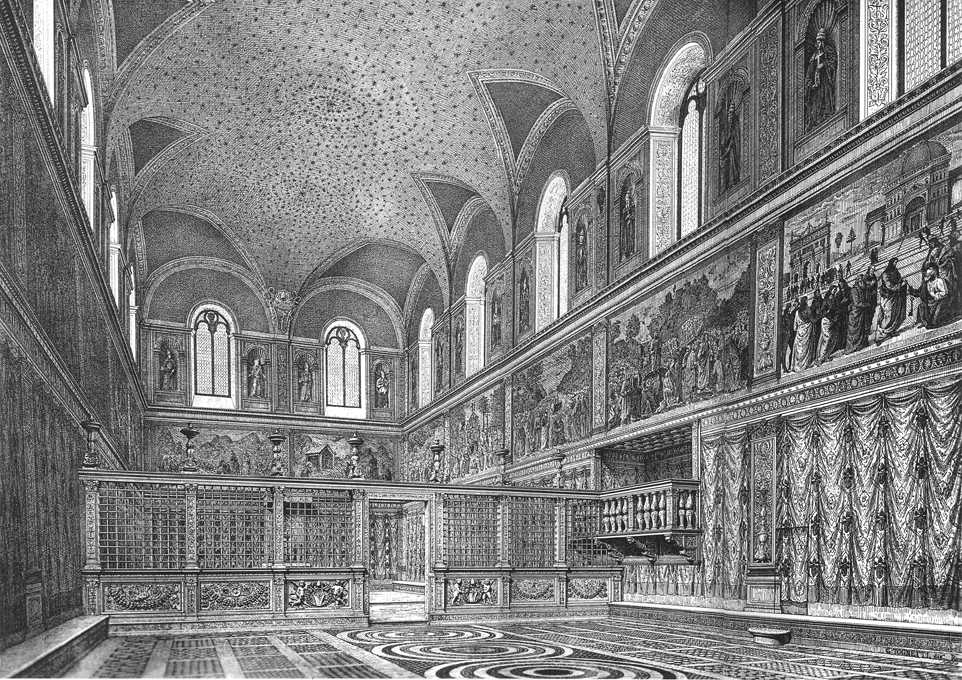
The ceiling as it may have looked before Michelangelo painted it

The original ceiling painting was by Pier Matteo d'Amelia, and had depicted stars over a blue background like the ceiling of the Arena Chapel decorated by Giotto at Padua. For six months in 1504, a diagonal crack in the chapel's vault had made the chapel unusable, and Pope Julius II (Giuliano della Rovere) had the damaged painting removed by Piero Roselli, a friend of Michelangelo.

Julius II was a "warrior pope" who in his papacy undertook an aggressive campaign for political control to unite and empower Italy under the leadership of the Catholic Church. He invested in symbolism to display his temporal power, such as his procession, in which he (in the Classical manner) rode a chariot through a triumphal arch after one of his many military victories. Julius II's project to rebuild St. Peter's Basilica would distinguish it as the most potent symbol of the source of papal power; he ultimately demolished and replaced the original basilica with a grander one intended to house his own tomb. The pope summoned Michelangelo to Rome in early 1505 and commissioned him to design his tomb, forcing the artist to leave Florence with his planned Battle of Cascina painting unfinished. By this time, Michelangelo was established as an artist; (Note: Walter Pater writes, "Michelangelo was now thirty years old, and his reputation was established. Three great works fill the remainder of his life – three works often interrupted, carried on through a thousand hesitations, a thousand disappointments, quarrels with his patrons, quarrels with his family, quarrels perhaps most of all with himself – the Sistine Chapel, the Mausoleum of Julius the Second, and the Sacristy of San Lorenzo".) both he and Julius II had hot tempers and soon argued. On 17 April 1506, Michelangelo left Rome in secret for Florence, remaining there until the Florentine government pressed him to return to the pope.

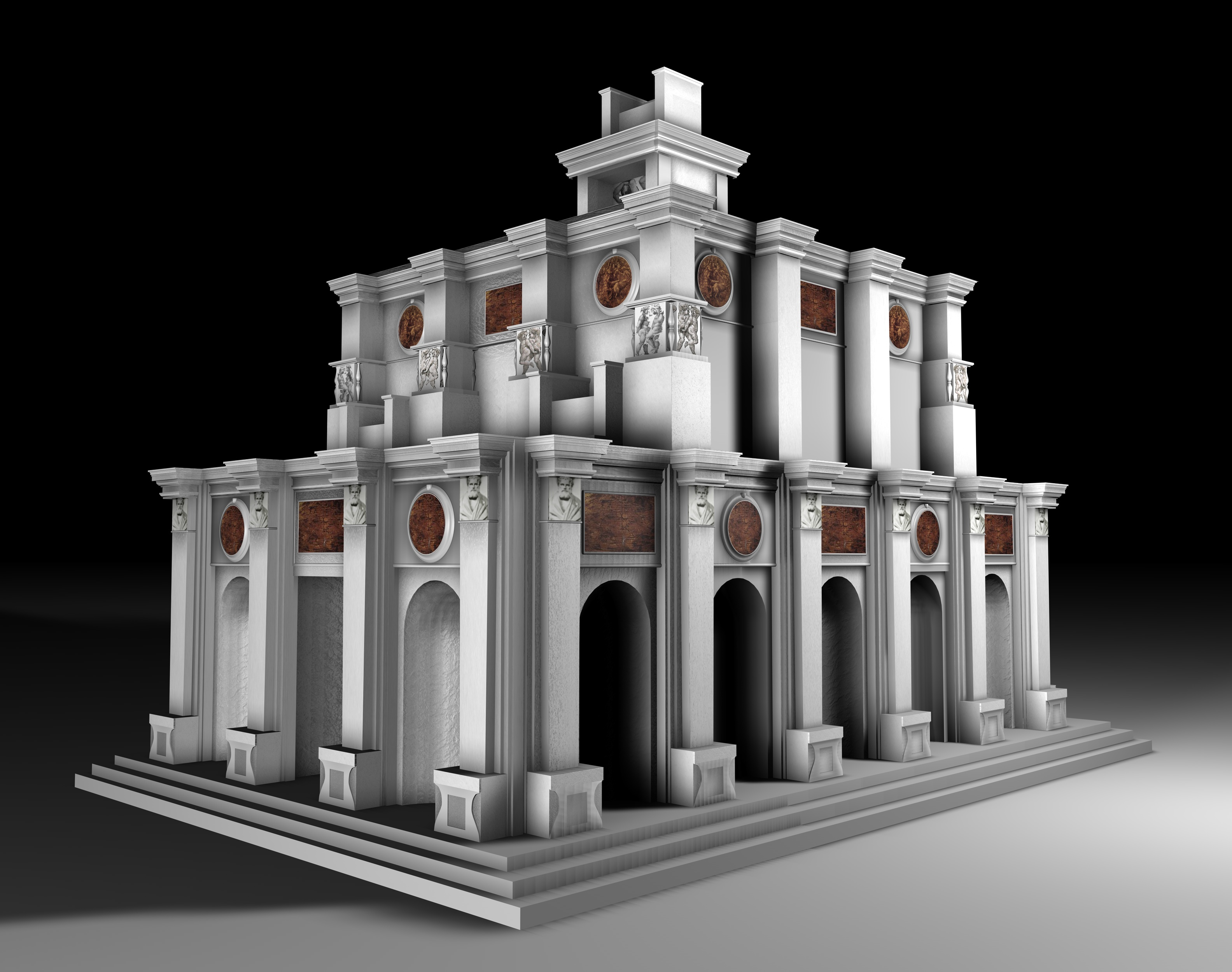
Hypothetical reconstruction of the first project for the tomb of Julius II (1505) according to an interpretation by Adriano Marinazzo (2018)

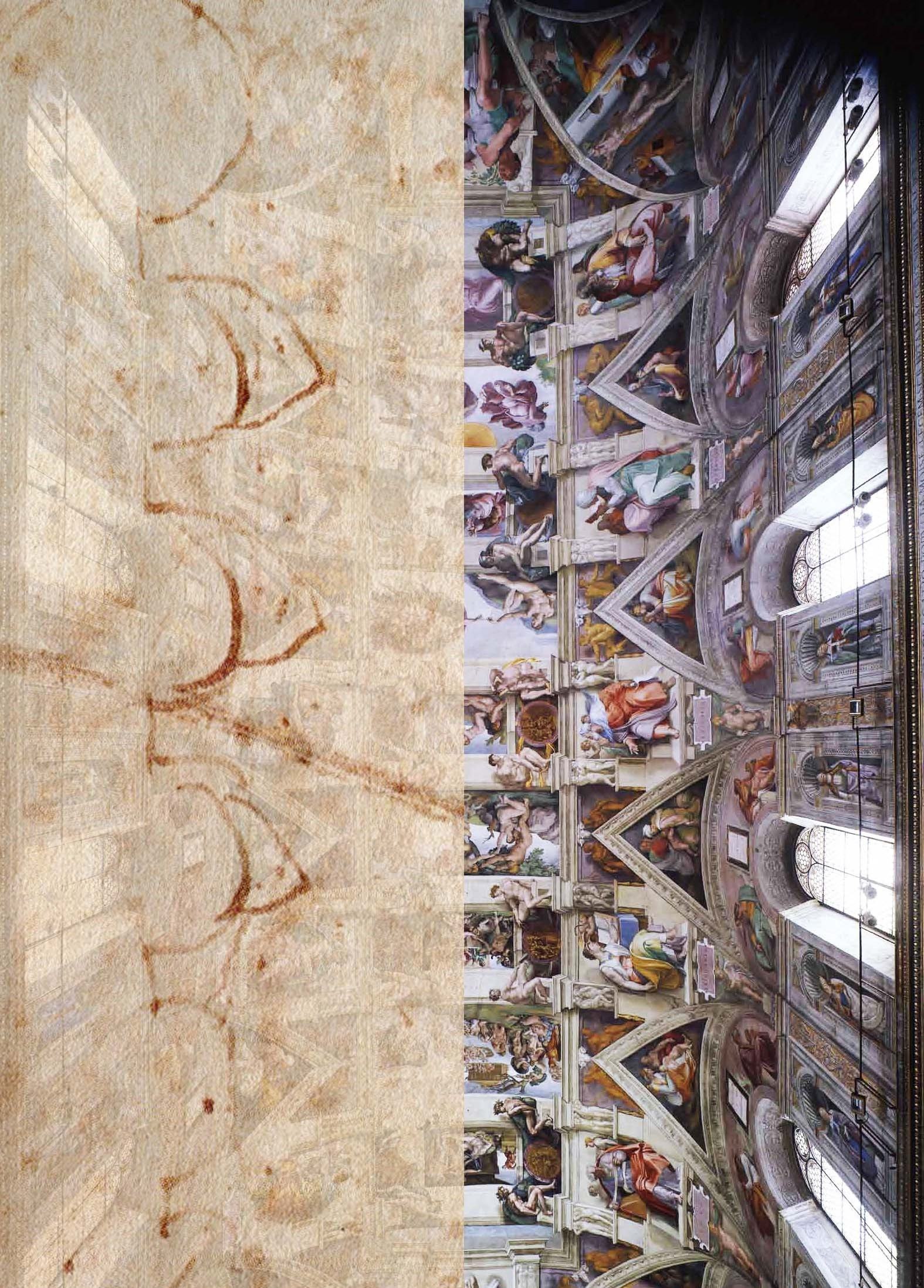
Michelangelo's structural sketch (Archivio Buonarroti, XIII, 175v) overlaid on the Chapel ceiling

In 1506, the same year the foundation stone was laid for the new St. Peter's, (Note: This engaged Julius II's attention and by February 1513, when he died, little work had been done on his tomb. It had been a grand commission, with 40 large figures to be carved. Its original design was never begun. Ultimately Michelangelo finished only three figures for the completed monument of 1545, reduced successively to a series of more modest designs, and built finally in the Church of San Pietro in Vincoli, including the c. 1515 statue of Moses. The tomb commission lasted decades, and Michelangelo lamented, "I have wasted all my youth chained to this tomb." Michelangelo's pupil and biographer Ascanio Condivi described the affair as the "Tragedy of the Tomb".) Julius II conceived a programme to paint the ceiling of the Sistine Chapel. It is probable that, because the chapel was the site of regular meetings and Masses of an elite body of officials known as the Papal Chapel (who would observe the decorations and interpret their theological and temporal significance), it was Julius II's intention and expectation that the iconography of the ceiling was to be read with many layers of meaning.

The scheme proposed by the pope was for twelve large figures of the Apostles to occupy the spandrels. Michelangelo negotiated for a grander, much more complex scheme and was finally permitted, in his own words, "to do as I liked". (Note: It is unknown and the subject of speculation among art historians whether Michelangelo was really able to paint the ceiling completely as he wished.) It has been suggested that Augustinian friar and cardinal Giles of Viterbo could have influenced the ceiling's theological layout. Many writers consider that Michelangelo had the intellect, the biblical knowledge, and the powers of invention to have devised the scheme himself. This is supported by Michelangelo's biographer Ascanio Condivi's statement that the artist read and reread the Old Testament while he was painting the ceiling, drawing his inspiration from the words of the scripture, rather than from the established traditions of sacral art.

On 10 May 1506, Piero Roselli wrote to Michelangelo on behalf of the pope. In this letter, Roselli mentions that papal court architect Donato Bramante doubted that Michelangelo could take on such a large fresco project, as he had limited experience in the medium. (Note: Seeming to contradict Roselli's letter, Ascanio Condivi theorized that Bramante put Michelangelo's name forward for the project in a scheme to humiliate him, as he was more skilled as a sculptor.) According to Bramante, Michelangelo stated his refusal. In November 1506 Michelangelo went to Bologna, where he received a commission from the pope to construct a colossal bronze statue of him conquering the Bolognese. (Note: The Bolognese destroyed the bronze in 1511.) After he completed this in early 1508, Michelangelo returned to Rome expecting to resume work on the papal tomb, but this had been quietly set aside. (Note: The tomb project, which Michelangelo would return to, was reinvigorated by Julius II's family after the pope's 1513 death.)

Michelangelo was instead commissioned for a cycle of frescoes on the vault and upper walls of the Sistine Chapel. Michelangelo, who was not primarily a painter but a sculptor, was reluctant to take on the work; he suggested that his young rival Raphael take it on instead. The pope was persistent; according to Giorgio Vasari, he was provoked by Bramante to insist that Michelangelo take on the project, leaving him little choice but to accept. The contract was signed on 8 May 1508, with a promised fee of 3,000 ducats (approximately US$600,000 in gold in 2021). At the pope's behest, Bramante built the initial scaffolding, hung via ropes from holes in the ceiling. This method displeased Michelangelo as it would force him to paint around the holes, and he had freestanding scaffolding constructed instead. This was built by Piero Roselli, who subsequently roughcast the ceiling. Michelangelo initially sought to engage assistants who were more well-versed in fresco-painting, but he was unable to find suitable candidates and decided to paint the whole ceiling alone. Among the Florentine artists whom Michelangelo brought to Rome in the hope of assisting in the fresco, Vasari names Francesco Granacci, Giuliano Bugiardini, Jacopo di Sandro, l'Indaco the Elder, Agnolo di Domenico, and Aristotile.

Michelangelo soon began his work, starting at the west end with the Drunkenness of Noah and the Prophet Zechariah and working backwards through the narrative to the Creation of Eve, in the vault's fifth bay, finished in September 1510. The first half of the ceiling was unveiled with a preliminary showing on 14 August 1511 and an official viewing the next day. A long hiatus in painting occurred as new scaffolding was made ready. The second half of the ceiling's frescoes were done swiftly, and the finished work was revealed on 31 October 1512, All Hallows' Eve, being shown to the public by the next day, All Saints' Day. Michelangelo's final scheme for the ceiling includes over 300 figures. (Note: By one count, there are 343 figures.)

Vasari states that "When the chapel was uncovered, people from everywhere [rushed] to see it, and the sight of it alone was sufficient to leave them amazed and speechless." At the age of 37, Michelangelo's reputation rose such that he was called il divino ('the divine'), and he was henceforth regarded as the greatest artist of his time, who had elevated the status of the arts themselves, a recognition that lasted the rest of his long life. The ceiling was immediately considered one of the greatest masterpieces of all time, a distinction which continues to endure.

=== Method ===
Michelangelo probably began working on the plans and sketches for the design from April 1508. The preparatory work on the ceiling was complete in late July the same year and on 4 February 1510, Francesco Albertini recorded that Michelangelo had "decorated the upper, arched part with very beautiful pictures and gold". The main design was largely finished in August 1510, as Michelangelo's texts suggest. From September 1510 until February, June, or September 1511, Michelangelo did no work on the ceiling on account of a dispute over payments for work done; in August 1510 the pope left Rome for the Papal States' campaign to reconquer Bologna and despite two visits there by Michelangelo, resolution only came months after the pope's return to Rome in June 1511. On 14 August 1511, Julius held a papal mass in the chapel and saw the progress of the work so far for the first time. This was the vigil for Assumption Day on 15 August, the Sistine Chapel's patronal feast. The whole design was revealed to visitors on 31 October 1512 with a formal papal mass the following day, the feast of All Saints. Clerical use of the chapel continued throughout, except when the work on the scaffolding necessitated its closure, and disruption to the rites was minimized by beginning the work at the west end, furthest from the liturgical centre around the altar at the east wall. Debate exists on what sequence the parts of the ceiling were painted in and over how the scaffold that allowed the artists to reach the ceiling was arranged. There are two main proposals.

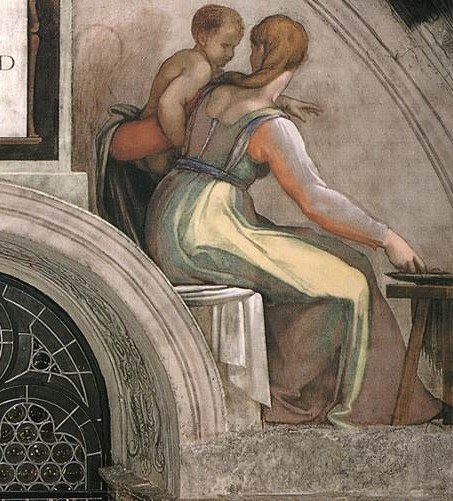
The mark of the scaffolding used for painting the ceiling is evident on the lower right of this lunette.

The majority theory is that the ceiling's main frescoes were applied and painted in phases, with the scaffolding each time dismantled and moved to another part of the room, beginning at the chapel's west end. The first phase, including the central life of Noah, was completed in September 1509 and the scaffolding removed; only then were the scenes visible from the floor level. The next phase, in the middle of the chapel, completed the Creation of Eve and the Fall and Expulsion from Paradise. The Cumaean Sibyl and Ezekiel were also painted in this phase. Michelangelo painted the figures at a larger scale than in the previous section; this is attributed to the artist's ability to effectively judge the foreshortening and composition from ground level for the first time. The figures of the third phase, at the east end, were at still grander scale than the second; The Creation of Adam and the other Creation panels were finished at this stage, which took place in 1511. The lunettes above the windows were painted last, using a small movable scaffold. In this scheme, proposed by Johannes Wilde, the vault's first and second registers, above and below the fictive architectural cornice, were painted together in stages as the scaffolding moved eastwards, with a stylistic and chronological break westwards and eastwards of the Creation of Eve. After the central vault the main scaffold was replaced by a smaller contraption that allowed the painting of the lunettes, window vaults, and spandrels. This view supplanted an older view that the central vault formed the first part of the work and was completed before work began on the other parts of Michelangelo's plan.

Another theory is that the scaffolding must have spanned the entire chapel for years at a time. To remove the existing decoration of the ceiling, the entire area had to be accessible for workmen to chisel away the starry-sky fresco before any new work was done. On 10 June 1508, the cardinals complained of the intolerable dust and noise generated by the work; by 27 July 1508, the process was complete and the corner spandrels of the chapel had been converted into the doubled-spandrel triangular pendentives of the finished design. Then the frame of the new designs had to be marked out on the surface when frescoeing began; this too demanded access to the whole ceiling. This thesis is supported by the discovery during the modern restoration of the exact numbers of the giornate employed in the frescoes; if the ceiling was painted in two stages, the first spanning two years and extending to the Creation of Eve and the second lasting just one year, then Michelangelo would have to have painted 270 giornate in the year-long second phase, compared with 300 painted in the first two years, which is scarcely possible. By contrast, if the ceiling's first register – with the nine scenes on rectangular fields, the medallions, and the ignudi – was painted in the first two years, and in the second phase, Michelangelo painted only their border in the second register with the Prophets and Sibyls, then the giornate finished in each year are divided almost equally. Ulrich Pfisterer, advancing this theory, interprets Albertini's remark on "the upper, arched part with very beautiful pictures and gold" in February 1510 as referring only to the upper part of the vault – the first register with its nine picture fields, its gnudi, and its medallions embellished with gold – and not to the vault as a whole since the fictive architectural attic with its prophets and prophetesses were yet to be started.

The scaffolding needed to protect the chapel's existing wall frescoes and other decorations from falling debris and allow the religious services to continue below, but also to allow in air and some light from the windows below. The chapel's cornice, running around the room below the lunettes at the springing of the window arches themselves, supported the structure's oblique beams, while the carrying beams were set into the wall above the cornice using putlog holes. This open structure supported catwalks and the movable working platform itself, whose likely stepped design followed the contour of the vault. Beneath was a false ceiling that protected the chapel. Though some sunlight would have entered the workspace between the ceiling and the scaffolding, artificial light would have been required for painting, candlelight possibly influencing the appearance of the vivid colors used.

Restoration overseer Fabrizio Mancinelli speculates that Michelangelo may have only installed scaffolding platforms in one half of the room at a time to cut the cost of timber and to allow light to pass through the uncovered windows. The areas of the wall covered by the scaffolding still appear as unpainted areas at the base of the lunettes.

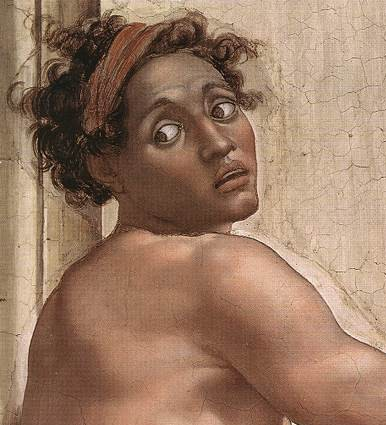
The evidence of the plaster laid for a day's work can be seen around the head and arm of this ignudo.

The entire ceiling is a fresco, which is an ancient method for painting murals that relies upon a chemical reaction between damp lime plaster and water-based pigments to permanently fuse the work into the wall. Michelangelo had been an apprentice in the workshop of Domenico Ghirlandaio, one of the most competent and prolific of Florentine fresco painters, at the time that the latter was employed on a fresco cycle at Santa Maria Novella and whose work was represented on the walls of the Sistine Chapel. At the outset, the plaster, intonaco, began to grow mildew or mould because it was too wet. When Michelangelo despaired of continuing, the pope sent Giuliano da Sangallo, who explained how to remove the fungus. Because Michelangelo was painting al fresco, the plaster was laid in a new section every day, called a giornata. At the beginning of each session, the edges would be scraped away and a new area laid down.

The work commenced at the end of the building furthest from the altar with the last chronological part of the narrative and progressed towards the altar with the scenes of the Creation. The first three scenes, from The Drunkenness of Noah, contain crowded compositions of smaller figures than other panels, evidently because Michelangelo misjudged the ceiling's size. Also painted in the early stages was the Slaying of Goliath. After painting the Creation of Eve adjacent to the marble screen which divided the chapel, (Note: It now stands further from the altar.) Michelangelo paused in his work to move the scaffolding to the other side. After having seen his completed work so far, he returned to work with the Temptation and Fall, followed by the Creation of Adam. As the scale of the work got larger, Michelangelo's style became broader; the final narrative scene of God in the act of creation was painted in a single day.

According to Vasari, the ceiling was unveiled before it could be reworked with a secco and gold to give it "a finer appearance" as had been done with the chapel's wall frescoes. Both Michelangelo and Pope Julius II wanted these details to be added, but this never took place, in part because Michelangelo did not want to rebuild the scaffolding; he also argued that "in those days men did not wear gold, and those who are painted ... were holy men who despised wealth." Julius II died only months after the ceiling's completion, in February 1513.

According to Vasari and Condivi, Michelangelo painted in a standing position, not lying on his back, as another biographer, Paolo Giovio, imagined. Vasari wrote: "These frescos were done with the greatest discomfort, for he had to stand there working with his head tilted backwards." Michelangelo may have described his physical discomfort in a poem, accompanied by a sketch in the margin, which was probably addressed to the humanist academician Giovanni di Benedetto da Pistoia, a friend with whom Michelangelo corresponded. Leonard Barkan compared the posture of Michelangelo's marginalia self-portrait to the Roman sculptures of Marsyas Bound in the Uffizi Gallery; Barkan further connects the flayed Marsyas with Michelangelo's purported self-portrait decades later on the flayed skin of St Bartholomew in his Last Judgment but cautions that there is no certainty the sketch represents the process of painting the chapel ceiling. Michelangelo wrote the poem describing the arduous conditions under which he worked. Michelangelo's illustrated poem reads:

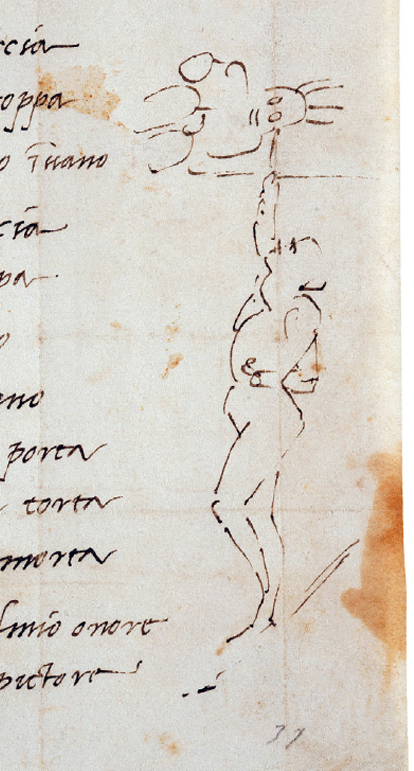
Michelangelo's illustration to his poem shows him painting the ceiling.

I' ho già fatto un gozzo in questo stento,
coma fa l'acqua a' gatti in Lombardia
o ver d'altro paese che si sia,
c'a forza 'l ventre appicca sotto 'l mento.
La barba al cielo, e la memoria sento
in sullo scrigno, e 'l petto fo d'arpia,
e 'l pennel sopra 'l viso tuttavia
mel fa, gocciando, un ricco pavimento.
E' lombi entrati mi son nella peccia,
e fo del cul per contrapeso groppa,
e' passi senza gli occhi muovo invano.
Dinanzi mi s'allunga la corteccia,
e per piegarsi adietro si ragroppa,
e tendomi com'arco sorïano.
Però fallace e strano
surge il iudizio che la mente porta,
ché mal si tra' per cerbottana torta.
La mia pittura morta
difendi orma', Giovanni, e 'l mio onore,
non sendo in loco bon, né io pittore.

— No. 5. A Giovanni quel propio da Pistoia
Translation:

I've grown a goitre by dwelling in this den–
As cats from stagnant streams in Lombardy,
Or in what other land they hap to be–
Which drives the belly close beneath the chin:
My beard turns up to heaven; my nape falls in,
Fixed on my spine: my breast-bone visibly
Grows like a harp: a rich embroidery
Bedews my face from brush-drops thick and thin.
My loins into my paunch like levers grind:
My buttock like a crupper bears my weight;
My feet unguided wander to and fro;
In front my skin grows loose and long; behind,
By bending it becomes more taut and strait;
Crosswise I strain me like a Syrian bow:
Whence false and quaint, I know,
Must be the fruit of squinting brain and eye;
For ill can aim the gun that bends awry.
Come then, Giovanni, try
To succour my dead pictures and my fame;
Since foul I fare and painting is my shame.

— No. 5: To Giovanni a Pistoia – On the Painting of the Sistine Chapel,
trans. John Addington Symonds, 1878

Jelbert has suggested that the physical pain described in this poem, and the pose of Michelangelo in his illustration for it, resonate with the agonised postures of the Vatican's 'Laocoön Group'. In the illustration, suggests Jelbert, Michelangelo appears to have drawn himself as the dying son on the right-hand side of the group (his arm sheered at the wrist), and the figure he is painting has the raised knees, wild eyes and broken right arm of Laocoön himself. Michelangelo's reference to the 'Laocoön Group' in the 'Brazen Serpent' has been noted above, but the artist also alluded to this sculpture in other areas of the Sistine ceiling, including the 'Punishment of Haman', and a pair of ignudi between the 'Sacrifice of Noah' and the 'Prophet Isiah'.

== Content ==
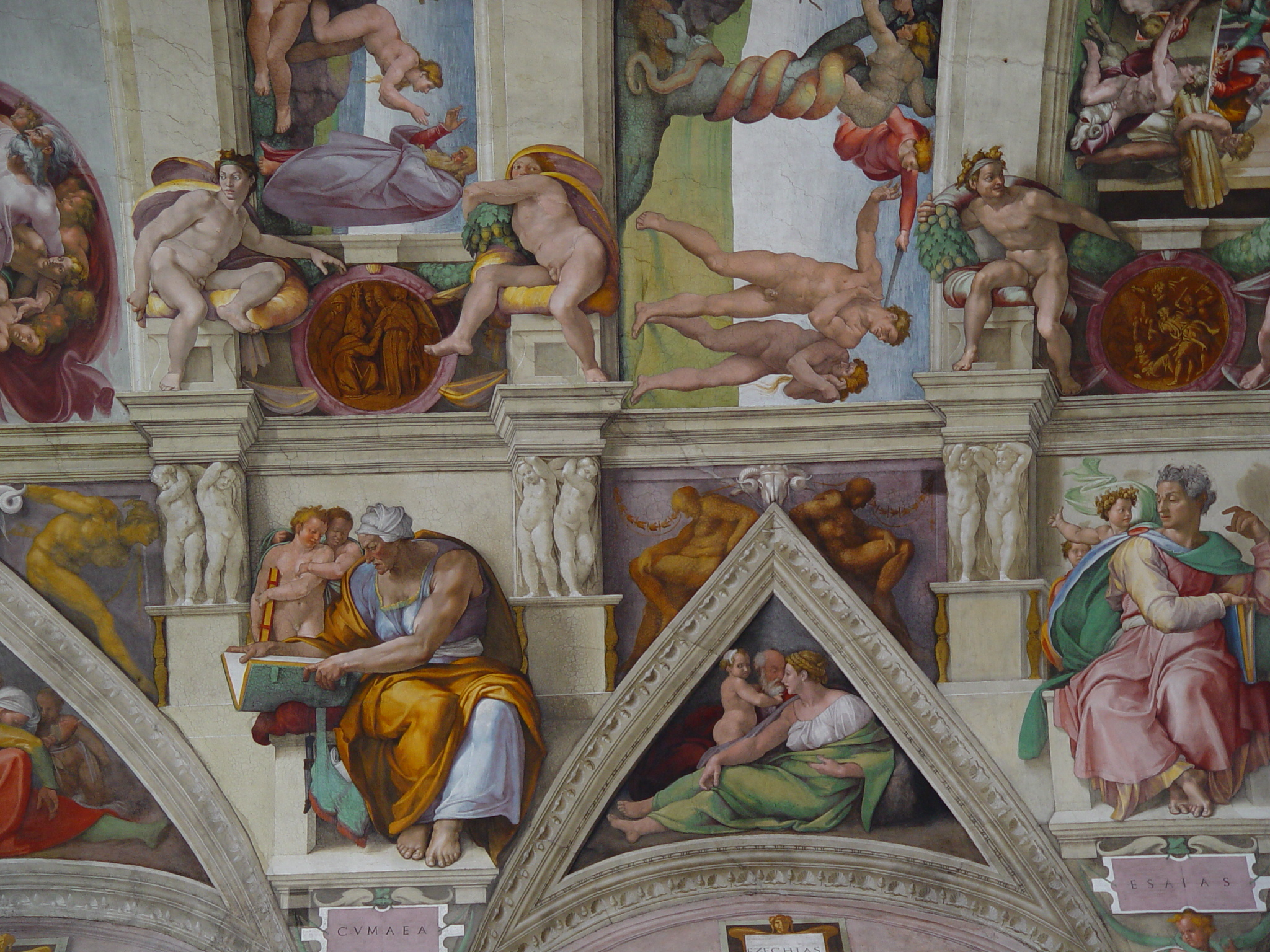
Detail showing intersection of first and second registers, with: a prophet, a lunette, a sibyl, ignudi, medallions, bronze figures, and telamones

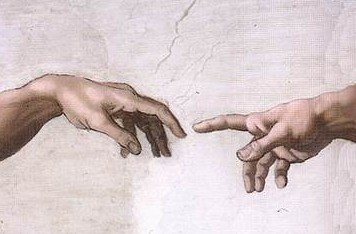
Detail from The Creation of Adam, portraying the creation of mankind by God. The two index fingers are separated by a small gap [3/4 inch (1.9 cm)]: some scholars think that it represents the unattainability of divine perfection by man.

Michelangelo's frescoes form the backstory to the 15th-century narrative cycles of the lives of Moses and Jesus Christ by Perugino and Botticelli on the chapel's walls. While the main central scenes depict incidents in the Book of Genesis, the first book of the Bible, much debate exists on the multitudes of figures' exact interpretation. The Sistine Chapel's ceiling is a shallow barrel vault around 35 metres (118 feet) long and around 14 m (46 ft) broad. The chapel's windows cut into the vault's curve, producing a row of lunettes alternating with spandrels.

Though Michelangelo claimed he eventually had a free hand in the artistic scheme, this claim was also made by Lorenzo Ghiberti about his monumental bronze doors for the Florence Baptistery, for which it is known Ghiberti was constrained by stipulations on how the Old Testament scenes should appear and was able to decide merely the forms and number of the picture fields. It is likely that Michelangelo was free to choose forms and presentation of the design, but that the subjects and themes themselves were decided by the patron.

The central, almost flat field of the ceiling is delineated by a fictive architectural cornice and divided into four large rectangles and five smaller ones by five pairs of painted ribs which cut laterally across the central rectangular field. Michelangelo painted these rectangles, which appear open to the sky, with scenes from the Old Testament.

The narrative begins at the chapel's east end, with the first scene above the altar, focus of the Eucharistic ceremonies performed by the clergy. The small rectangular field directly above the altar depicts the Primal Act of Creation. The last of the nine central fields, at the west end, shows the Drunkenness of Noah; below this scene is the door used by the laity. Furthest from the altar, the Drunkenness of Noah represents the sinful nature of man.

Above the cornice, at the four corners of each of the five smaller central fields, are nude male youths, called ignudi, whose precise significance is unknown. Close to the sacred scenes in the uppermost register and unlike the figures of the lower register shown in perspective, they are not foreshortened. They probably represent the Florentine Neoplatonists' view of humanity's ideal Platonic form, without the mar of Original Sin, to which the lower figures are all subject. Kenneth Clark wrote that "their physical beauty is an image of divine perfection; their alert and vigorous movements an expression of divine energy".

Below the painted cornice around the central rectangular area is a lower register depicting a continuation of the chapel's walls as a trompe-l'œil architectural framework against which figures press, with powerful modelling. The figures are drastically foreshortened and are at larger scale than the figures in the central scenes, which according to Harold Osborne and Hugh Brigstocke creates "a sense of spatial disequilibrium".

The ceiling at the chapel's four corners forms a doubled spandrel painted with salvific scenes from the Old Testament: The Brazen Serpent, The Crucifixion of Haman, Judith and Holofernes, and David and Goliath. On the crescent-shaped areas, or lunettes, above each of the chapel's windows are tablets listing the ancestors of Christ and accompanying figures. Above them, in the triangular spandrels, a further eight groups of figures are shown, but these have not been identified with specific biblical characters. The scheme is completed by four corner doubled-spandrels, also referred to less accurately as pendentives, each illustrating a dramatic biblical story.

Each of the chapel's window arches cuts into the curved vault, creating above each a triangular area of vaulting. The arch of each window is separated from the next by these triangular spandrels, in each of which are enthroned Prophets alternating with the Sibyls. These figures, seven Old Testament prophets and five of the Graeco-Roman sibyls, were notable in Christian tradition for their prophesies of the Messiah or the Nativity of Jesus. The lunettes above the windows are themselves painted with scenes of the "purely human" Ancestors of Christ, as are the spaces either side of each window. Their position is both the lowest in the vault and the darkest, in contrast with the airy upper vault.

=== Interpretation ===
The overt subject matter of the ceiling is the Christian doctrine of humanity's need for salvation as offered by God through Jesus. It is a visual metaphor of humankind's need for a covenant with God. The Old Covenant of the Children of Israel through Moses and the New Covenant through Christ had already been represented around the walls of the chapel. Some experts, including Benjamin Blech and Vatican art historian Enrico Bruschini, have also noted less overt subject matter, which they describe as being "concealed" and "forbidden."

The main scheme of the ceiling illustrates God creating the perfect world prior to creating humanity, which causes its own fall into disgrace and is punished by being made mortal; humanity then sinks further into sin and disgrace, and is punished by the Great Flood. The ceiling's creation narrative ends with Noah's drunkenness, which Jesuit theologian John W. O'Malley says could be interpreted as focusing on the separation of Gentiles from Jews as the chosen people. Then, through a lineage of ancestors – from Abraham to Joseph – God sends the saviour of humanity, Jesus, whose coming is claimed in the New Testament to have been prophesied by prophets of Israel (to whom Michelangelo adds sibyls of the Classical world) and whose second coming the same artist returned to paint on the altar wall in his Last Judgment. The prophet Jonah, recognizable over the altar by the great fish beside him, (Note: The prophet Jonah (restored)) is cited by Jesus in the gospels as being related to his own coming death and resurrection, (Note: Gospel of Matthew 12:39–40.) which Staale Sinding-Larsen says "activates the Passion motif". In the Gospel of John, moreover, Jesus compares his being raised (i.e. his crucifixion) to Moses lifting the Brazen Serpent (Note: Gospel of John 3:14–15) to heal Israelites from fiery serpent bites; (Note: Numbers 21:4–9) the latter is painted on the doubled spandrel/pendentive above the altar to the left, opposite the Punishment of Haman, depicted as a crucifixion instead of a hanging.

Of the three Twelve Minor Prophets depicted on the ceiling, O'Malley discusses Jonah and Zechariah as carrying a particular significance. In addition to Jonah's connection to Jesus, O'Malley points out that he is a spokesman to the Gentiles. Zechariah prophesied that the Messiah would arrive on a donkey. (Note: Zechariah, chapter 9, verse 9; Matthew, chapter 21, verses 4–5) His place in the chapel is directly above the doorway across from the altar, through which the pope is carried in procession on Palm Sunday, the day on which Jesus rode a donkey into Jerusalem.

Much of the symbolism of the ceiling dates from the early church, but the ceiling also has elements that express the specifically Renaissance thinking that sought to reconcile Christian theology with the philosophy of Renaissance humanism. During the 15th century in Italy, and in Florence in particular, there was a strong interest in Classical literature and the philosophies of Plato, Aristotle and other Classical writers. Michelangelo, as a young man, had spent time at the Platonic Academy established by the Medici family in Florence. He was familiar with early humanist-inspired sculptural works such as Donatello's bronze David and had himself responded by carving the enormous nude marble David, which was placed in the Piazza della Signoria near the Palazzo Vecchio, the home of Florence's council. The humanist view of spirituality was that it is rooted in human nature and independent from intermediaries such as the Church, which emphasized humanity as essentially sinful and flawed. A synthesis, with man dignified and created in God's image, was epitomized by Giovanni Pico Della Mirandola's Oration on the Dignity of Man, which was referenced in sermons given at the papal court.

The iconography of the ceiling has had various interpretations in the past, some elements of which have been contradicted by modern scholarship. (Note: Both Vasari and Condivi mistake the Sacrifice of Noah for the sacrifices by Cain and Abel.) Others, such as the identity of the figures in the lunettes and spandrels poppets, continue to defy interpretation. Modern scholars have sought, as yet unsuccessfully, to determine a written source of the theological program of the ceiling and have questioned whether or not it was entirely devised by Michelangelo, who was both an avid reader of the Bible and is considered to be a genius. Art historian Anthony Bertram argues that the artist expressed his inner turmoil in the work, saying: "The principal opposed forces in this conflict were his passionate admiration for classical beauty and his profound, almost mystical Catholicism, his [presumed] homosexuality, and his horror of carnal sin combined with a lofty Platonic concept of love."

Edgar Wind postulated that the ten medallions represented violations of the Ten Commandments, with the obscured one above the Persian Sibyl standing for adultery. O'Malley points out that, if this is the case, the infractions of the commandments are arranged out of order.

=== The ceiling as a Renaissance puzzle ===
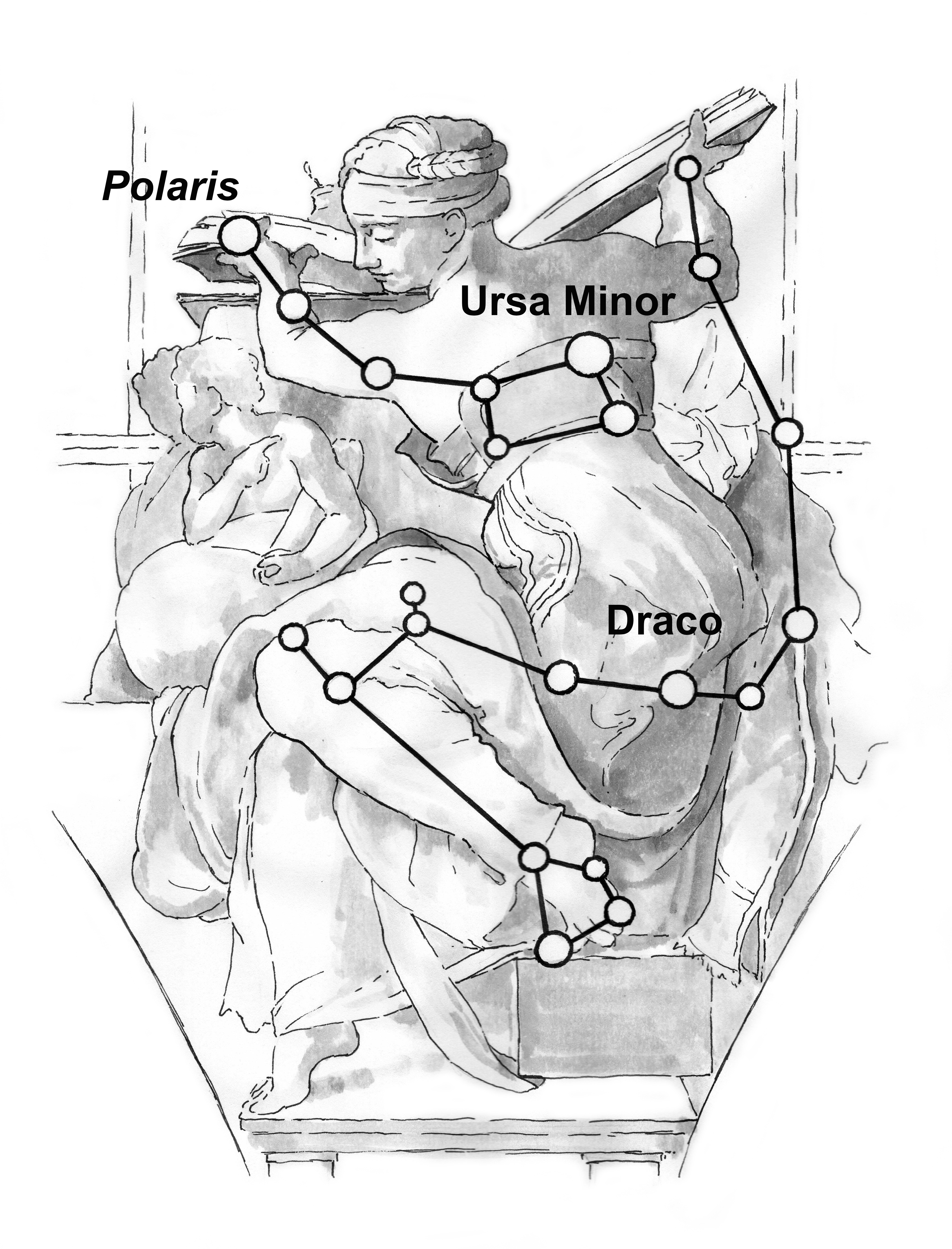
Libyan Sibyl, Sistine Chapel ceiling, with constellations of Draco and Ursa Minor superimposed (stars from International Astronomical Union diagrams - Ursa Minor very slightly enlarged and rotated). Sketch by Rebecca Jelbert, after Michelangelo.

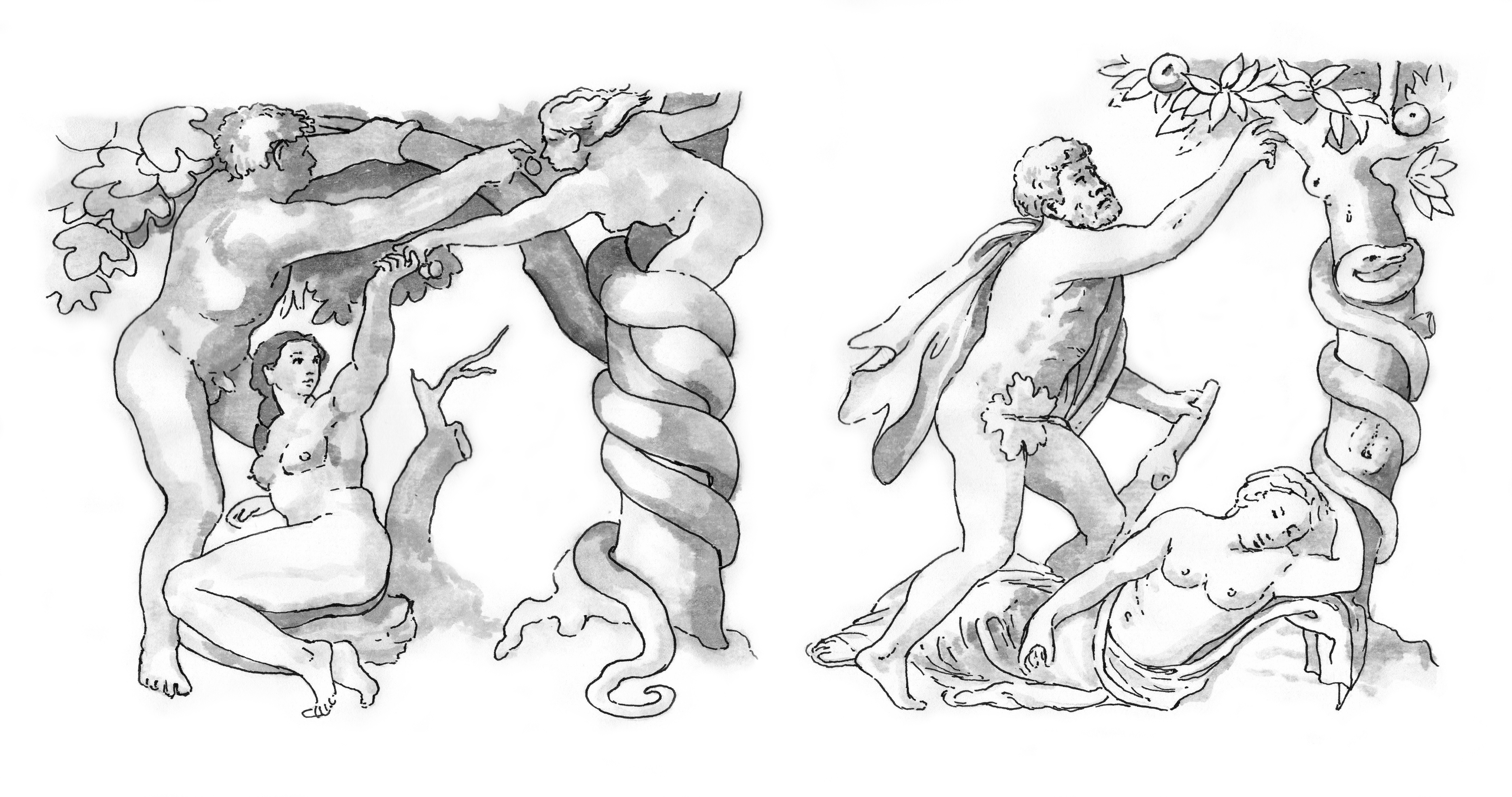
Image on left: Fall and Expulsion, Sistine Chapel ceiling (detail). Image on right: Hercules picking apples in the Garden of Hesperides. Engraving of this ancient Roman relief in Ferrari, G.B. (1646). Hesperides, siue, De malorum aureorum cultura et vsu libri quatuor / Io. Baptistae Ferrarii e Societate Iesu. Rome , p.27. Sketches by Rebecca Jelbert, after the originals.

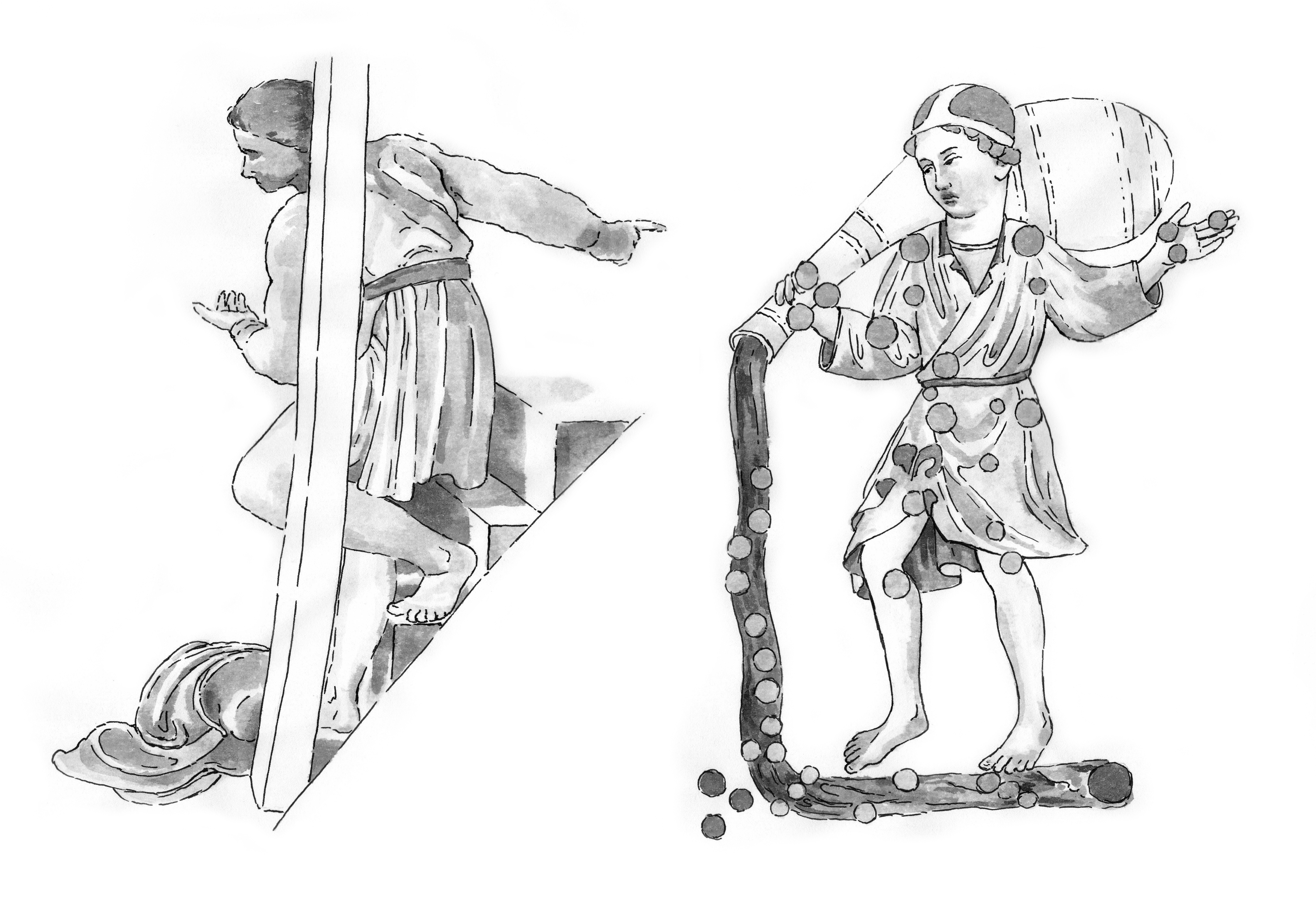
Image on left: Punishment of Haman, Sistine Chapel ceiling (detail). Image of right: Aquarius. Sufi latinus, North Italian, 15th-century illustration from Pergamenthandschrift M II 141 (Forschungbibliothek Gotha, Germany), after Al Sufi’s Liber locis stellarum fixarum, AD 964. Both figures are dressed in yellow, and in the diagonally opposite pendentive Judith's blue and yellow hat is very similar to Aquarius'. Sketches by Rebecca Jelbert, after the originals.

Much remains unknown about the circumstances of the Sistine Chapel ceiling commission. De Tolnay and Ramsden have noted that despite so much having been written about the Sistine ceiling, the main unifying, inspirational theme behind it remains illusive. Jelbert has suggested that one reason for the complex, enigmatic nature of Michelangelo's Sistine ceiling is that the artist created it as an intellectual Renaissance puzzle, based on celestial imagery and the symbolic meaning of the stars.

Michelangelo painted the Sistine Chapel ceiling when Renaissance puzzle culture was at its height. There is evidence to show that Michelangelo - like Leonardo da Vinci - engaged in the production of intellectual, visual puzzles. It has been suggested, for instance, that along the spine of the ceiling, Michelangelo created compositions that mapped to anatomic structures of the human body. As an example, Michelangelo appears to have designed Creation of Adam and Separation of Light from Darkness so that they map to the structures of the brain and eyes. It has also been noted that Michelangelo included references to urological and gynaecological organs along the length of the ceiling. In each of these individual frescos, the intended puzzle is 'solved' when the observer recalls the details of the correct anatomical organ and superimposes these over the painting concerned. In the centre of the Last Judgment, created on the altar wall of the Sistine Chapel approximately 25 years after the ceiling, we find another example of a visual puzzle in the form of a disguised self-portrait. First reported in 1925, Michelangelo's painting of Saint Bartholomew includes two faces that are entirely different from each other; the seated saint has a bald head and large grey beard, whilst the flayed skin hanging from his fingers contains the distinctive facial features and short dark hair of the artist himself.

A number of important celestial ceilings were created during the sixteenth century in Rome, including ceilings in the Vatican, in which carefully concealed messages conveyed information that had personal significance for the patrons concerned. The Sistine ceiling was originally painted as a starry night sky by Piermatteo d’Amelia, who recorded his celestial design in a small painting that is now held in the Uffizi, Florence (c.1481-1506). Métral points out that the stars painted across d’Amelia's original design were not random, but represented a path of constellations that held meaning for Pope Sixtus IV, who commissioned the chapel. Jelbert suggests that Michelangelo's ceiling - painted just three decades later (commissioned by Pope Julius II, who was Pope Sixtus IV's nephew) - also referred to a hidden path of stars, inspired by the papal court's continued interest in astronomy and the strong contemporary fascination for intellectual puzzles.

It has been suggested that Michelangelo evoked his trail of hidden constellations in several ways: by mapping a number of individual frescos to the shape of constellations; by visually quoting famous artwork that featured characters from star lore; and by including figures posed as celestial illustrations. The path of stars across the Sistine ceiling appears to have bridged the constellations that were traditionally linked to the celestial gates, through which the soul was believed to arrive at birth and depart at death, thus evoking the notion of the journey of life.

According to Jelbert, Michelangelo's design for his celestial ceiling was initially inspired by the sculpture, Laocoön and His Son (the Laocoön Group), which was unearthed in January 1506 and bought soon afterwards by Pope Julius II for the Vatican's newly created Belvedere Courtyard. As the image of Laocoön being attacked by snakes was traditionally linked to the combined constellations of Ophiuchus and Serpens, Michelangelo was able to place the celebrated Laocoön Group (a sculpture of Laocoön being crushed to death by sea serpents) within the context of a heavenly star map.

== Architectural scheme ==
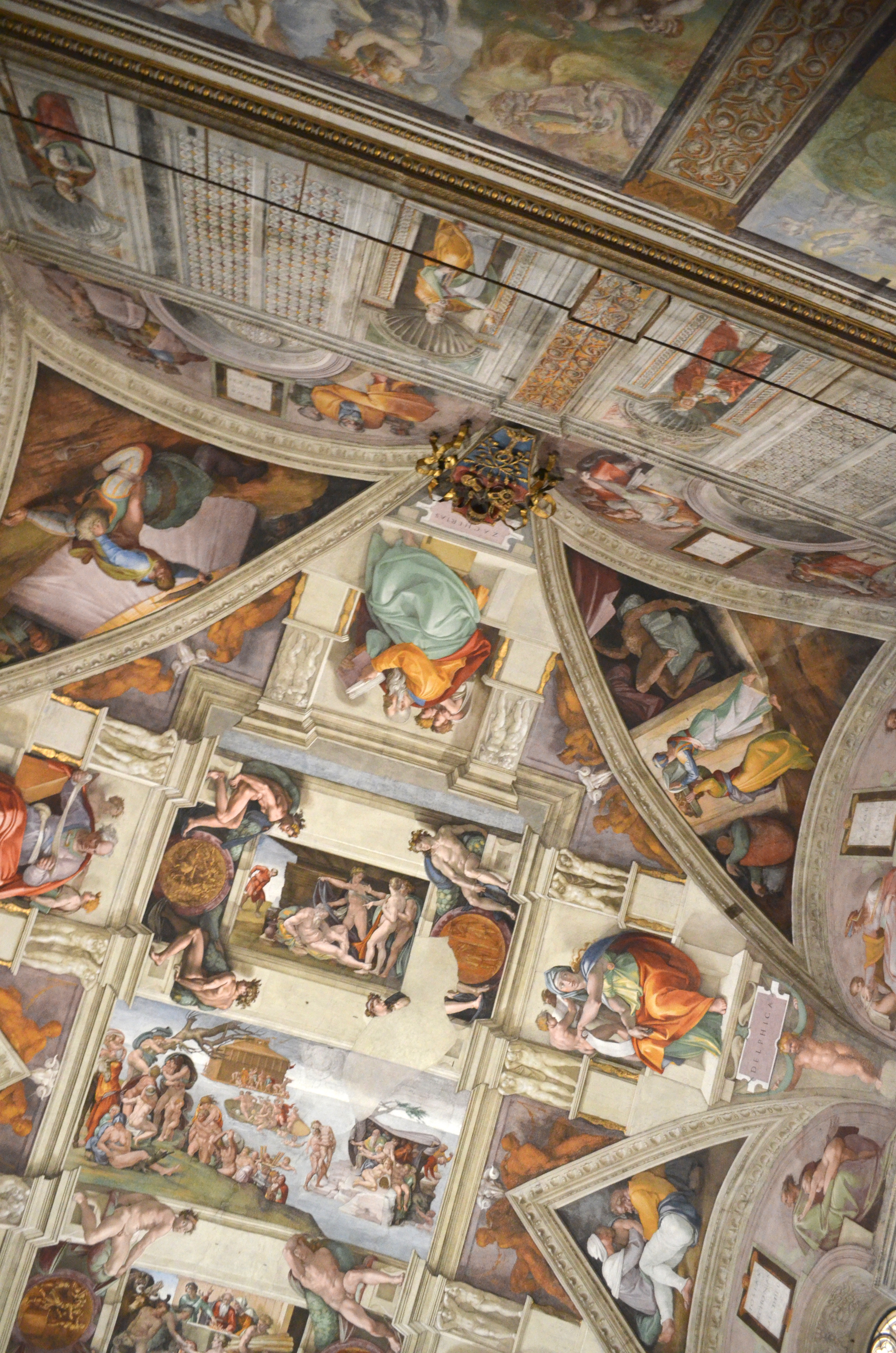
The ceiling's west end (above the entrance).

The Sistine Chapel is about 35 m (118 ft) long and 14 m (46 ft) wide, with the ceiling rising to about 20 m (66 ft) above the main floor. The vault is of quite a complex design and it is unlikely that it was originally intended to have such elaborate decoration.

The chapel walls have three horizontal tiers with six arched windows in the upper tier on each side. There were also two windows at each end; however, these were closed up above the altar when Michelangelo's The Last Judgment was painted, obliterating two lunettes. Between the windows are large spandrels that support the vault. Above each window, the ceiling features triangular spandrels that rise from the tops of the pilasters between the windows. At each corner of the chapel, there are doubled spandrels, also referred to as pendentives, which depict scenes of the miraculous salvation of the people of Israel: The Brazen Serpent, The Punishment of Haman, David and Goliath, and Judith and Holofernes. Above the height of these spandrels, the ceiling forms a flattened cross vault (or groin vault), springing from a continuous string course that encircles the walls at the level of the window arches.

The first element in Michelangelo's scheme of painted architecture is the visual clarification of the real architectural structure, achieved by accentuating the junctions between the vault and the supporting elements—namely, the triangular window spandrels and the four larger corner doubled spandrels (sometimes referred to as pendentives). Michelangelo achieved this by painting illusionistic architectural frames that both delineate and integrate these structural features into the overall compositional logic of the ceiling. Michelangelo painted these as decorative courses that look like sculpted stone mouldings. (Note: These are not marked on the drawn plan but are clearly visible in the photographs.) These have two repeating motifs: (Note: This evokes a formula common in Classical architecture, e.g. 'egg and dart' and 'bead and reel'.) the acorn and the scallop shell. The acorn is the symbol of the family of both Pope Sixtus IV, who built the chapel, and Julius II, who commissioned Michelangelo's work. (Note: Sixtus IV and Julius II were both of the Della Rovere family. "Rovere" in Italian means 'oak'.) The scallop shell is one of the symbols of the Madonna, to whose Assumption the chapel was dedicated in 1483. (Note: The scallop shell (and pearl) is a symbol of the doctrine of the Incarnation in Renaissance and baroque art.) The crown of the wall then rises above the spandrels, to a strongly projecting painted cornice that runs right around the ceiling, separating the pictorial areas of the biblical scenes from the figures of prophets, sibyls, and ancestors, who literally and figuratively support the narratives. Ten broad painted cross-ribs of travertine cross the ceiling and divide it into alternately wide and narrow pictorial spaces, a grid that gives all the figures their defined place.

A great number of small figures are integrated with the painted architecture, their purpose apparently purely decorative. These include pilasters with capitals supported by pairs of infant telamones, rams' skulls are placed at the apex of each spandrel like bucrania; bronze nude figures in varying poses, hiding in the shadows, propped between the spandrels and the ribs like animated bookends; and more putti, both clothed and unclothed, strike a variety of poses as they support the nameplates of the Prophets and Sibyls. Above the cornice and to either side of the smaller scenes are an array of medallions, or round shields. They are framed by a total of 20 more figures, the so-called ignudi, which are not part of the architecture but sit on plinths, their feet planted convincingly on the fictive cornice. Pictorially, the ignudi appear to occupy a space between the narrative spaces and the space of the chapel itself.

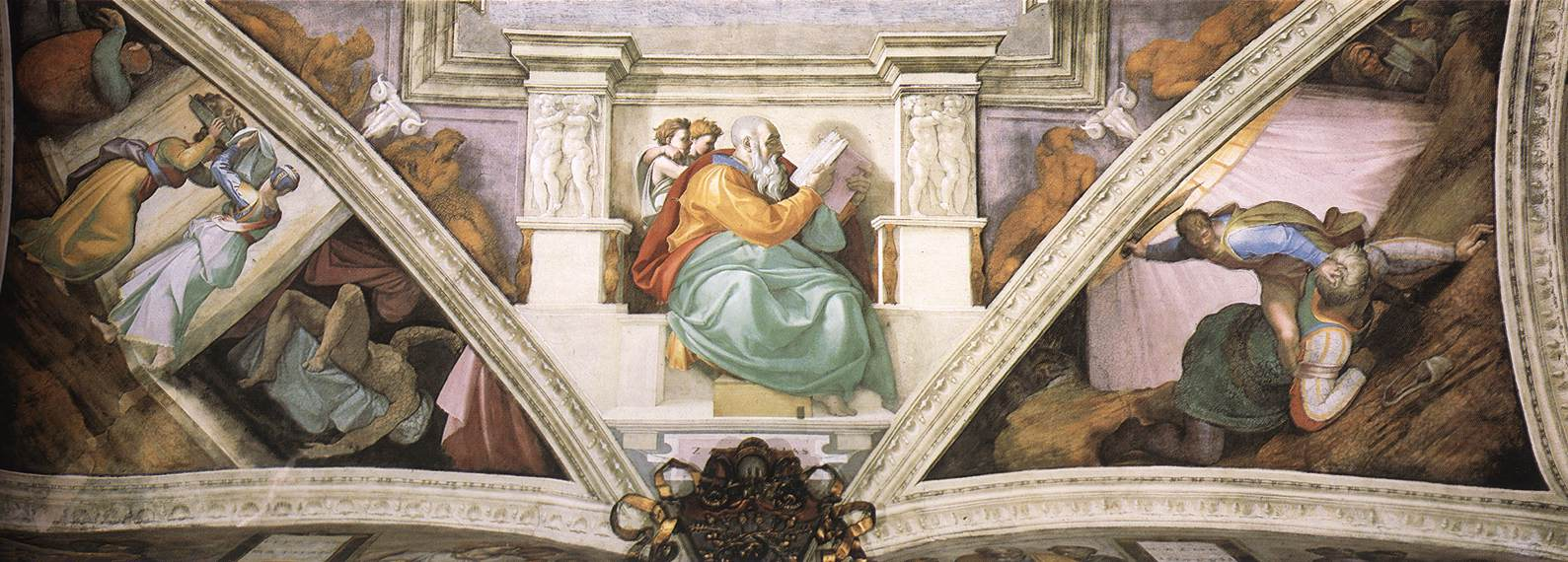
The ceiling's west end (detail), showing pendentives and the Prophet Zechariah

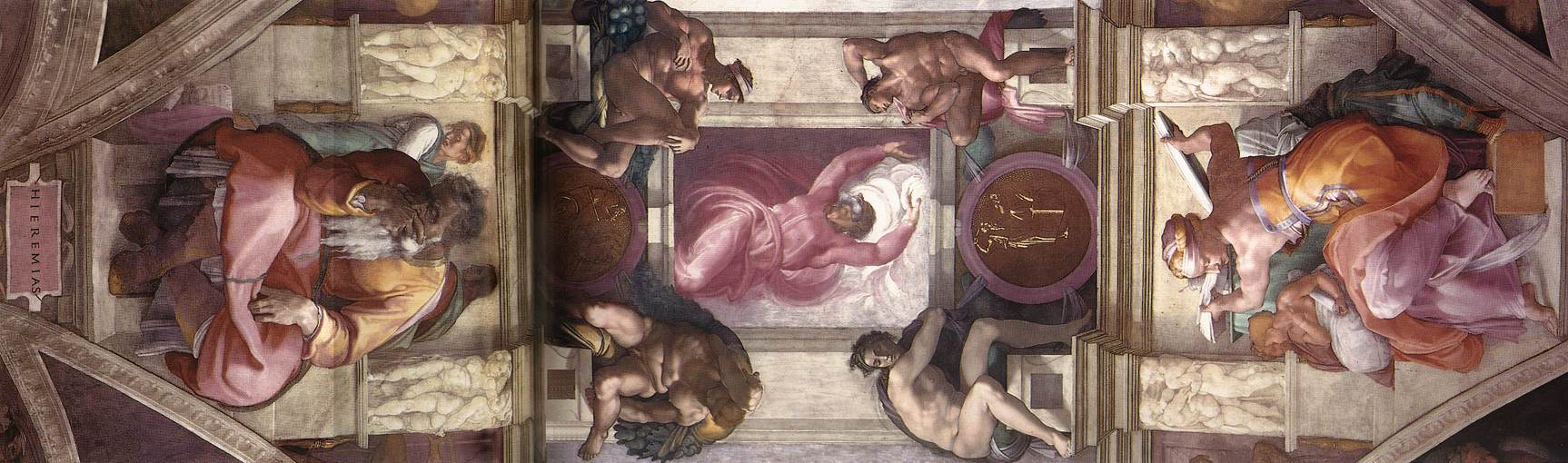
Separation of Light from Darkness, showing illusionary architecture and flanking Prophets

== Pictorial scheme ==
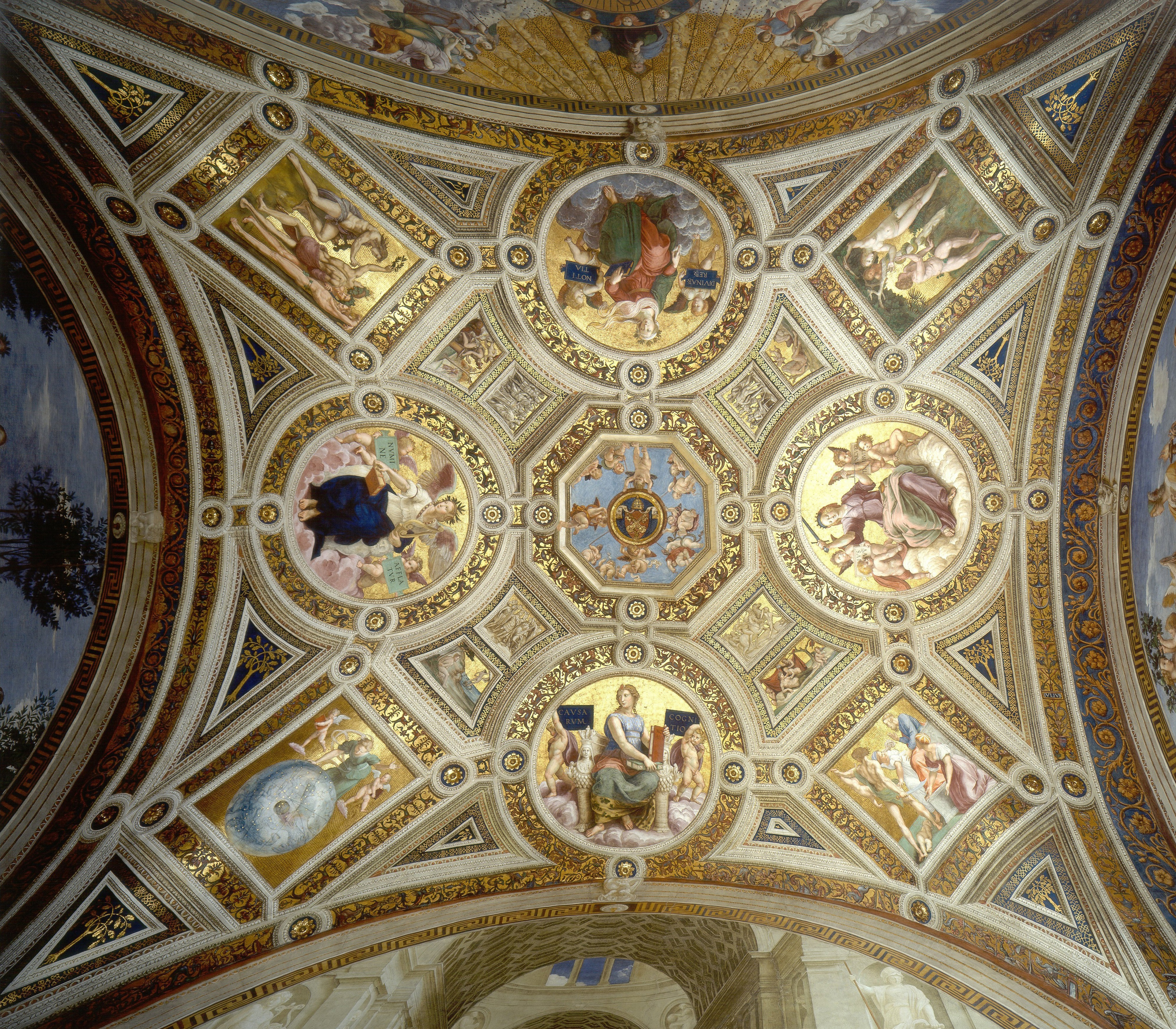
The ceiling of the Stanza della Segnatura in the Vatican Palace, commissioned by Julius in 1508

Like many Renaissance patrons, Pope Julius wanted the ceiling to follow a design he specified, and in early 1508 Michelangelo was presented with a scheme, which has not survived. The ceiling was to be divided into "an interlocking geometric pattern of squares and circles", and images were to include the Twelve Apostles on the spandrels. Other commissions by Julius in the same year, for ceilings in Santa Maria del Popolo and the Stanza della Segnatura in the Vatican Palace, also had geometric frameworks, all probably influenced by the Imperian Roman remains of Hadrian's Villa, Tivoli.

Michelangelo worked on drawings following the Pope's scheme, but eventually decided that it did not allow for sufficient numbers of human figures, his main interest in the commission. At a meeting later in the year, Julius allowed Michelangelo to change the design; according to Michelangelo's later account "he gave me a new commission, to do what I liked", a claim many art historians suspect is rather overstated.

The artist almost certainly worked with one or more specialist theologians, perhaps including Egidio da Viterbo, and perhaps the aristocratic papal diplomat Cardinal Francesco Alidosi, who Michelangelo used to help him dealing with Julius.

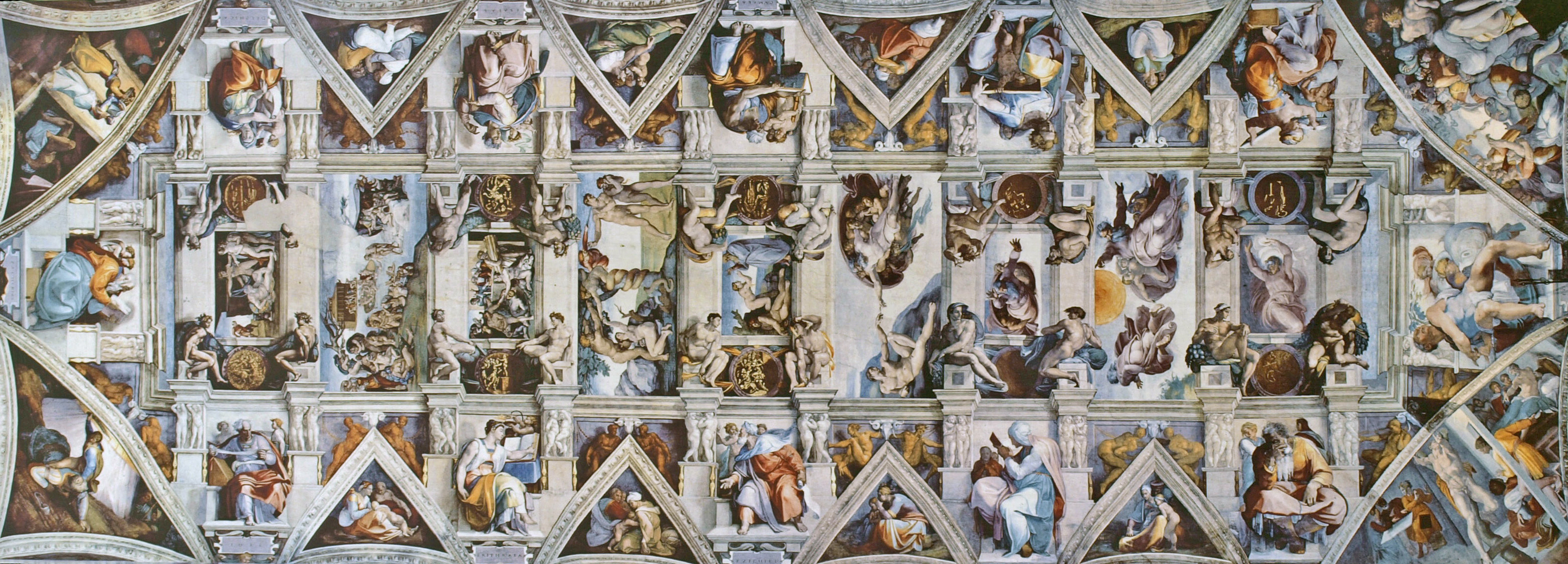
The ceiling of the Sistine Chapel
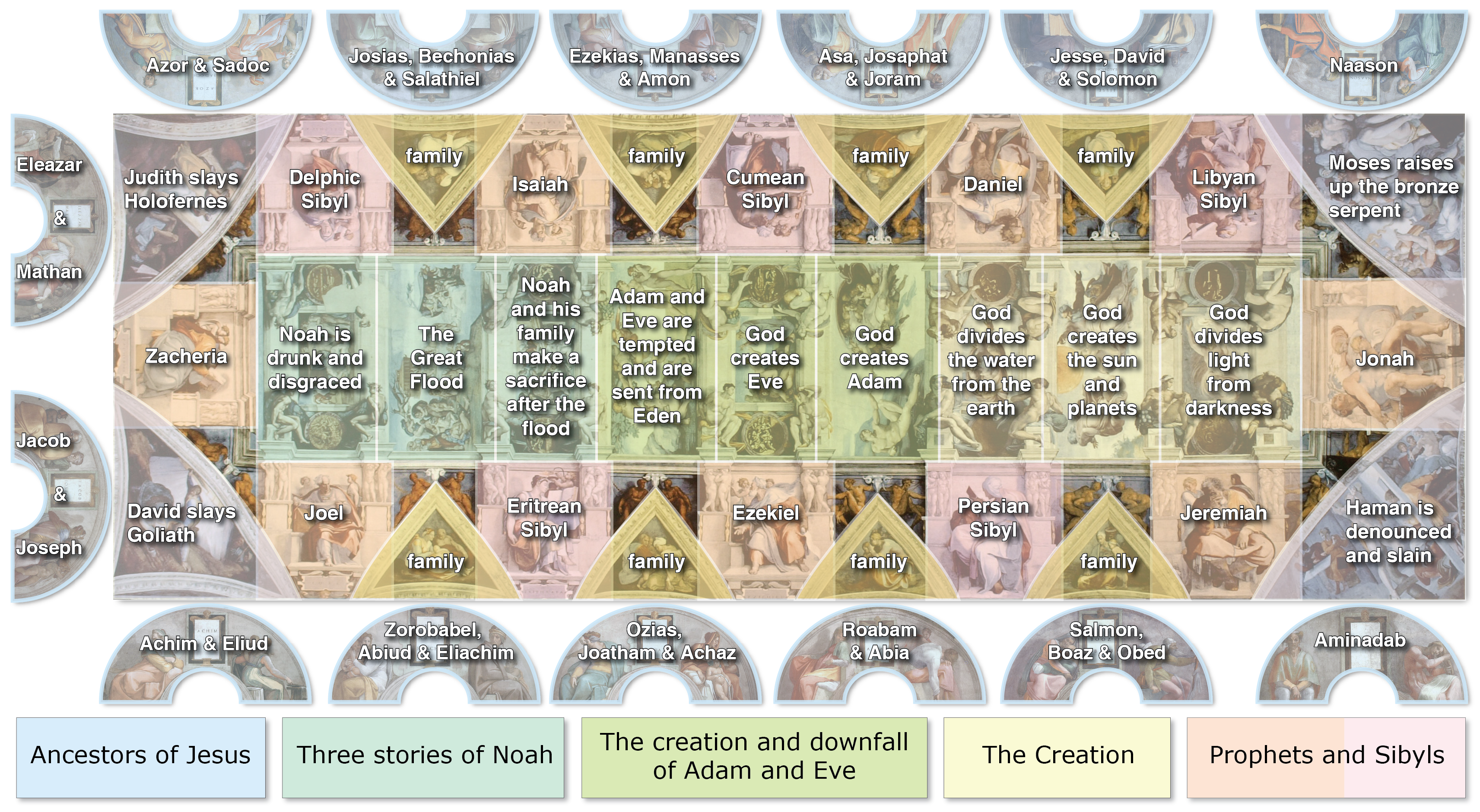
Plan of the pictorial elements of the ceiling showing the division of the narrative scenes into three-part themes

=== Nine scenes from the Book of Genesis ===
Along the central section of the ceiling, Michelangelo depicted nine scenes from the Book of Genesis, organized into three groups of three related scenes. The scenes alternate between smaller and larger pictures, with the former framed by two pairs of ignudi flanking a medallion. The first group depicts God creating the Heavens and the Earth. The second group shows God creating the first man and woman, Adam and Eve, and their disobedience of God and consequent expulsion from the Garden of Eden. The third group shows the plight of humanity and in particular the family of Noah.

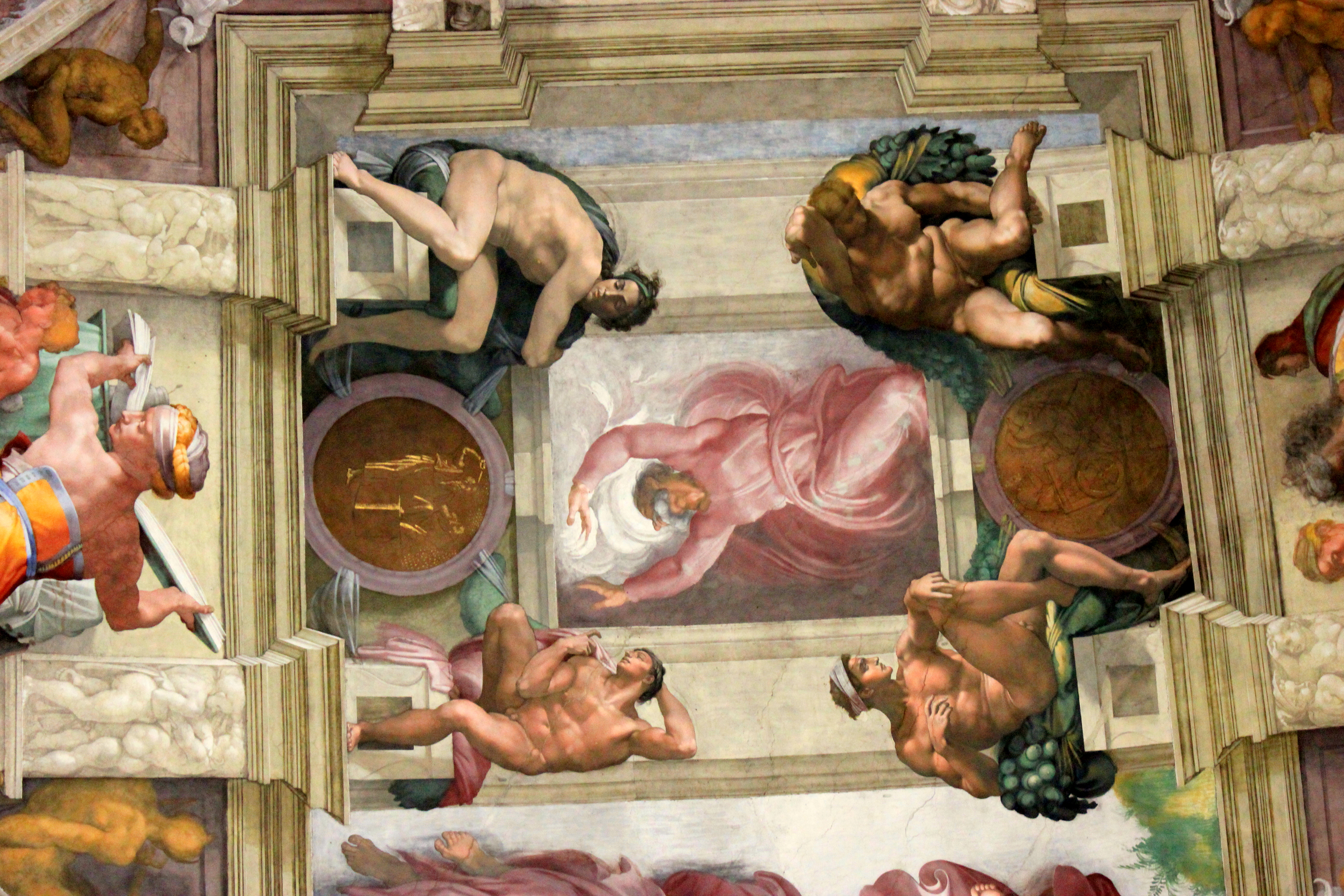
Separation of Light from Darkness

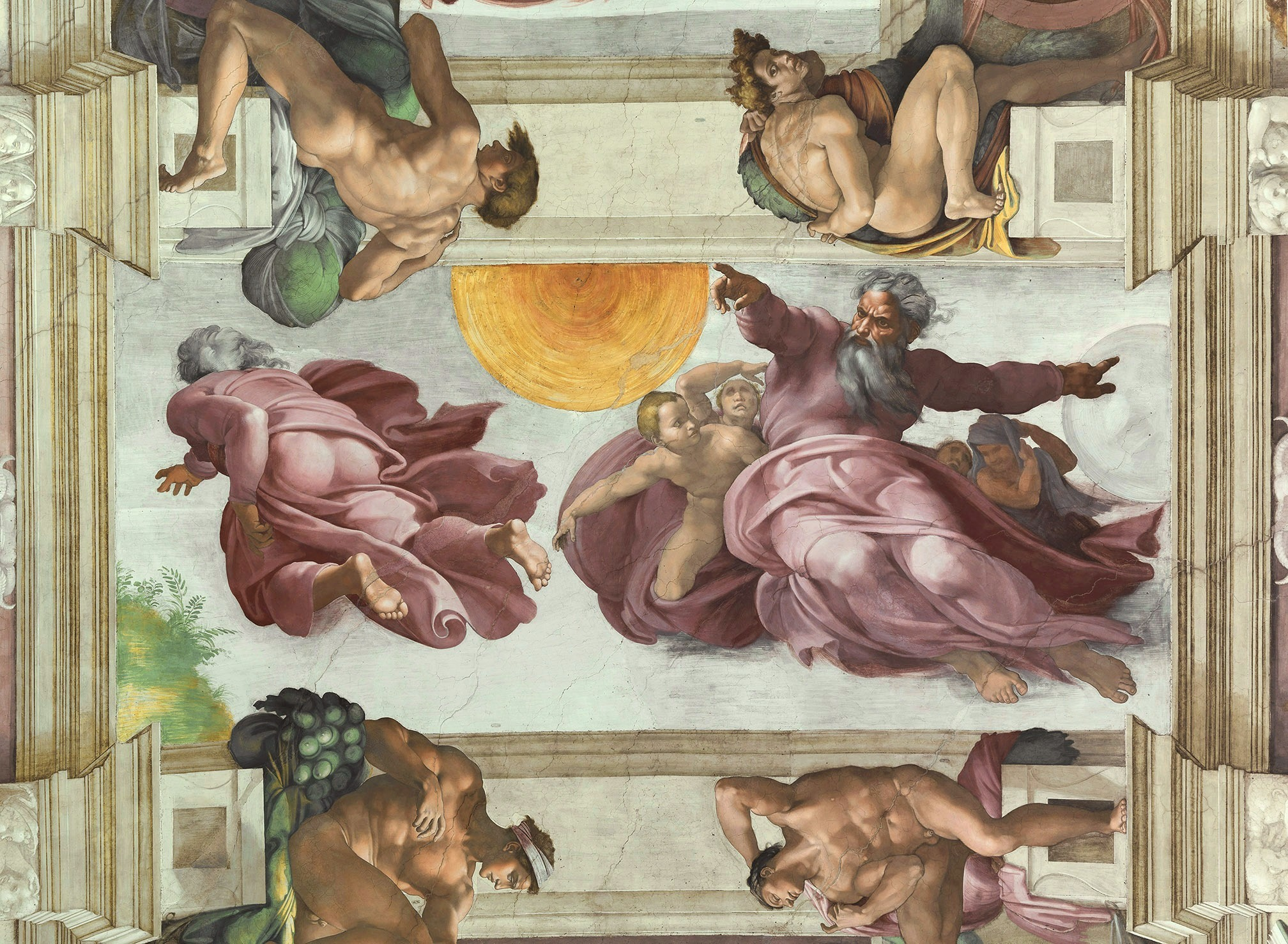
Creation of the Sun, Moon, and Plants

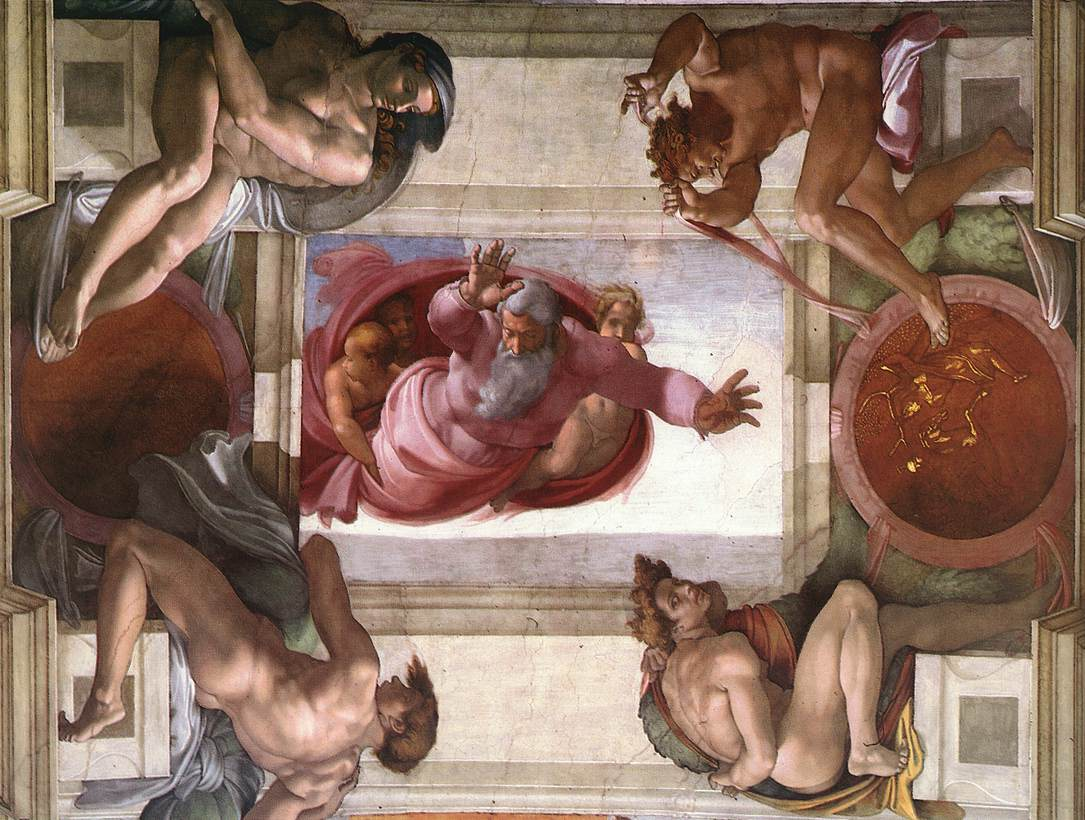
Separation of Land and Water

The pictures within the three groups link to one another, in the same way as was usual in Medieval art and stained glass. (Note: For instance, Poor Man's Bibles) The nine scenes are oriented to be viewed while facing the altar, chronologically unfolding towards the chapel entrance (except for the second and third scenes, and the seventh and eighth, which are each transposed). (Note: Genesis, chapters 1, 8–9) John T. Paoletti and Gary M. Radke suggest that this reversed progression symbolises a return to a state of grace.

The scenes, from the altar towards the main door, are as follows:

1. The Separation of Light from Darkness
2. The Creation of the Sun, Moon and Plants
3. The Separation of Land and Water
4. The Creation of Adam
5. The Creation of Eve
6. The Fall and Expulsion
7. The Sacrifice of Noah
8. The Great Flood
9. The Drunkenness of Noah

==== Creation ====
The three creation pictures show scenes from the first chapter of Genesis, which relates that God created the Earth and its inhabitants in six days, resting on the seventh day. In the first scene, the First Day of Creation, God creates light and separates light from darkness. (Note: First Day of Creation, in context with medallions and Ignudi (restored)) Chronologically, the next scene takes place in the third panel, in which, on the Second Day, God divides the waters from the heavens. (Note: Dividing Water and Heavens, in context with medallions and Ignudi (restored)) In the central scene, the largest of the three, there are two representations of God: on the Third Day, God creates the Earth and makes it sprout plants; on the Fourth Day, God puts the Sun and the Moon in place to govern the night and the day, the time and the seasons of the year. (Note: Creation of the Earth and the celestial bodies, (restored)) (Note: According to Genesis, on the fifth day, God created the birds of the air and fish and creatures of the deep, but this is not depicted, nor is God's creation of the creatures of the earth on the sixth day. (Note: Genesis, chapter 1))

These three scenes, completed in the third stage of painting, are the most broadly conceived, the most broadly painted and the most dynamic of all the pictures. Of the first scene Vasari says, "Michelangelo depicted God dividing the light from the darkness ... where He is seen in all His majesty as He sustains Himself alone with open arms in a demonstration of love and creative energy."

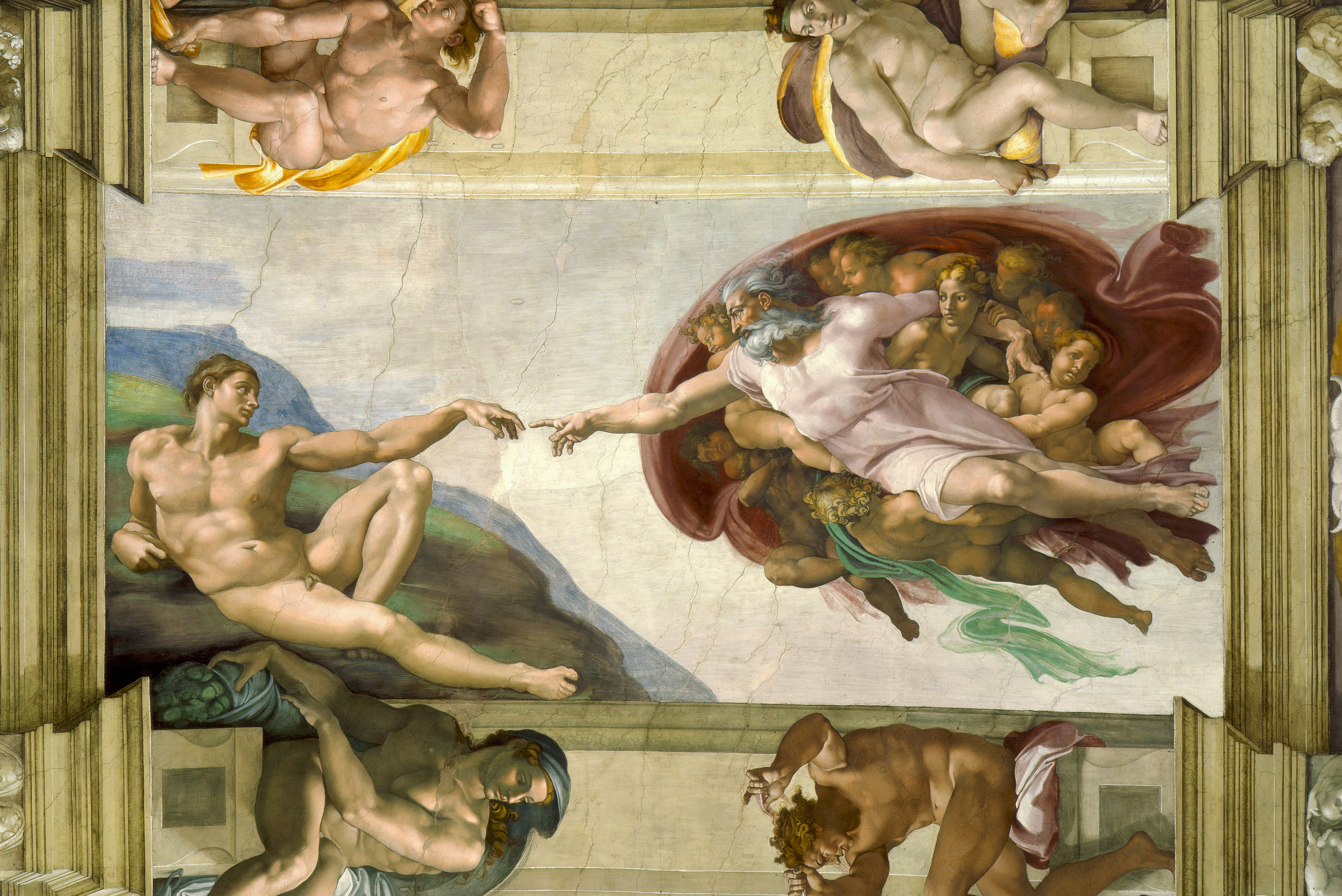
Creation of Adam

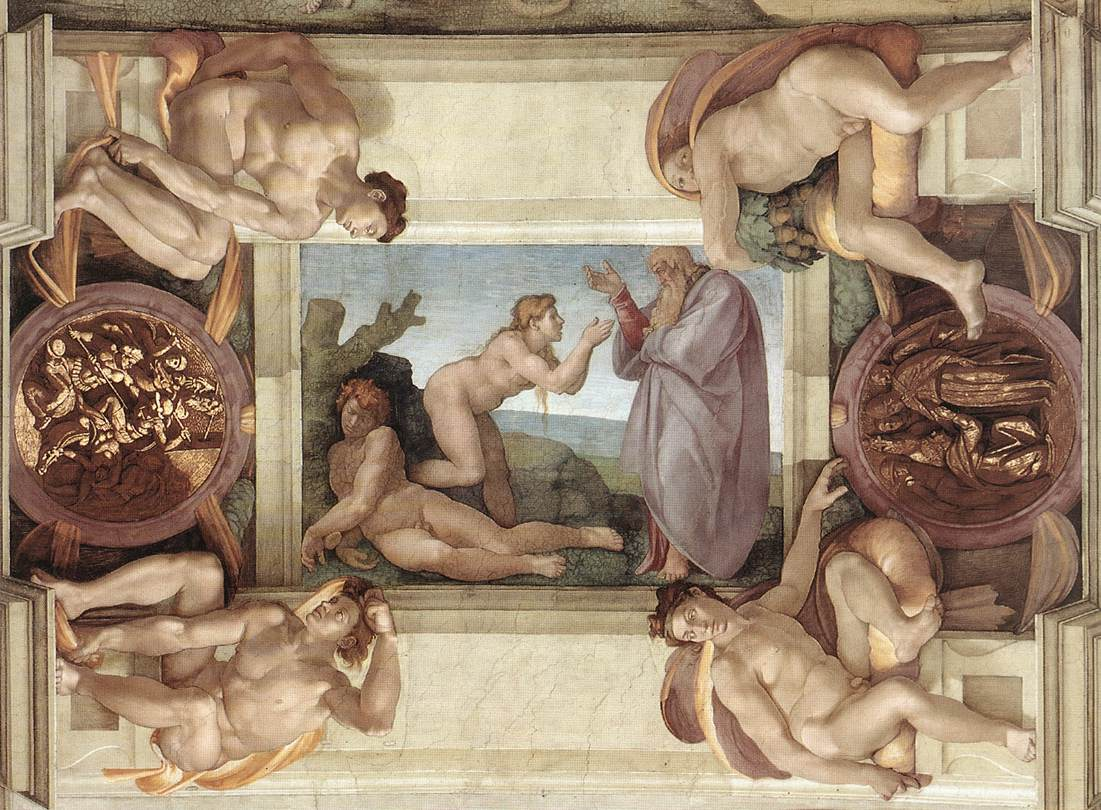
Creation of Eve

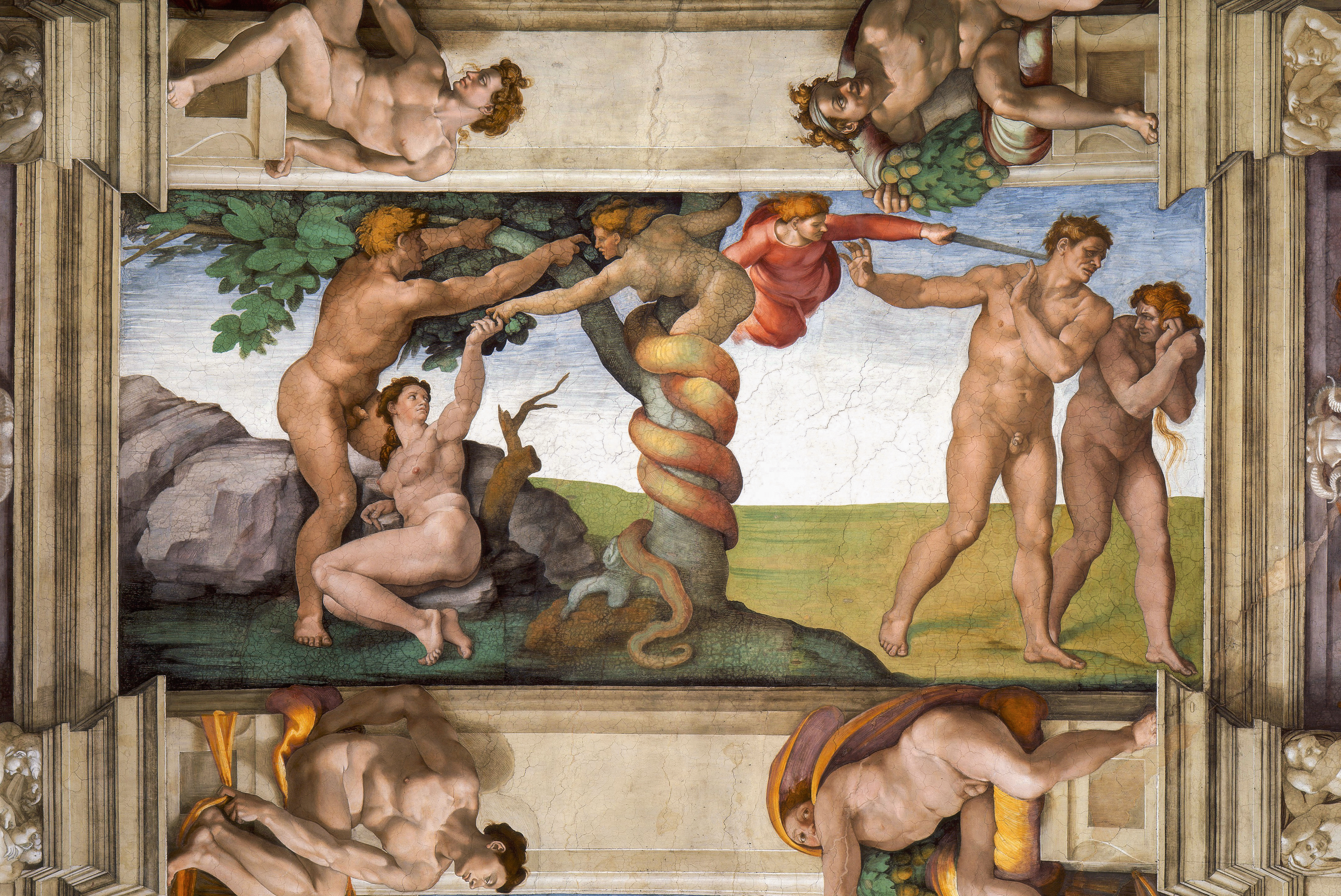
The Fall and Expulsion from Paradise

==== Adam and Eve ====
For the central section of the ceiling, Michelangelo took four episodes from the story of Adam and Eve as told in the first, second and third chapters of Genesis. In this sequence of three, two of the panels are large and one small.

In the first of the pictures, one of the most widely recognized images in the history of painting, Michelangelo shows God reaching out to touch Adam. Vasari describes Adam as "a figure whose beauty, pose, and contours are of such a quality that he seems newly created by his Supreme and First Creator rather than by the brush and design of a mere mortal." From beneath the sheltering arm of God, Eve looks out somewhat apprehensively. Correspondingly, Adam reaches out to the creator, who Walter Pater states "comes with the forms of things to be, woman and her progeny, in the fold of his garment". Pater wrote of the depiction of Adam in the Creation:

Fair as the young men of the Elgin marbles, the Adam of the Sistine Chapel is unlike them in a total absence of that balance and completeness which express so well the sentiment of a self-contained, independent life. In that languid figure there is something rude and satyr-like, something akin to the rugged hillside on which it lies. His whole form is gathered into an expression of mere expectation and reception; he has hardly strength enough to lift his finger to touch the finger of the creator; yet a touch of the finger-tips will suffice.

The central scene, of God creating Eve from the side of the sleeping Adam (Note: God creating Eve from the side of the sleeping Adam, in context with medallions and Ignudi (before restoration)) has been taken in its composition directly from another creation sequence, the relief panels that surround the door of the Basilica of San Petronio, Bologna, by Jacopo della Quercia, whose work Michelangelo had studied in his youth. In the final panel of this sequence, Michelangelo combines two contrasting scenes into one panel, (Note: Adam and Eve: temptation and banishment (restored)) that of Adam and Eve taking fruit from the forbidden tree (a fig and not an apple tree as commonly depicted in Western Christian art), Eve trustingly taking it from the hand of the Serpent (depicted as Lilith) and Adam eagerly picking it for himself, as well as their banishment from the Garden of Eden, where they have lived in the company of God, to the world outside where they have to fend for themselves and experience death. (Note: Genesis, chapters 1–3)

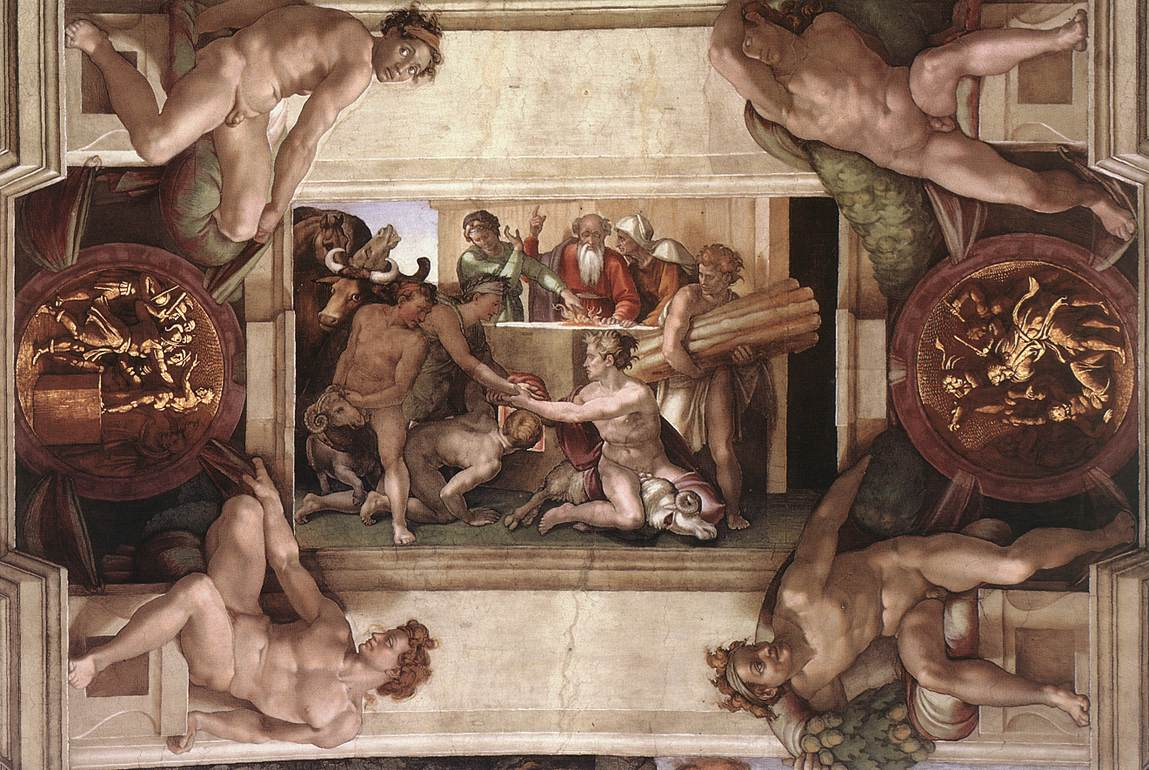
Sacrifice of Noah

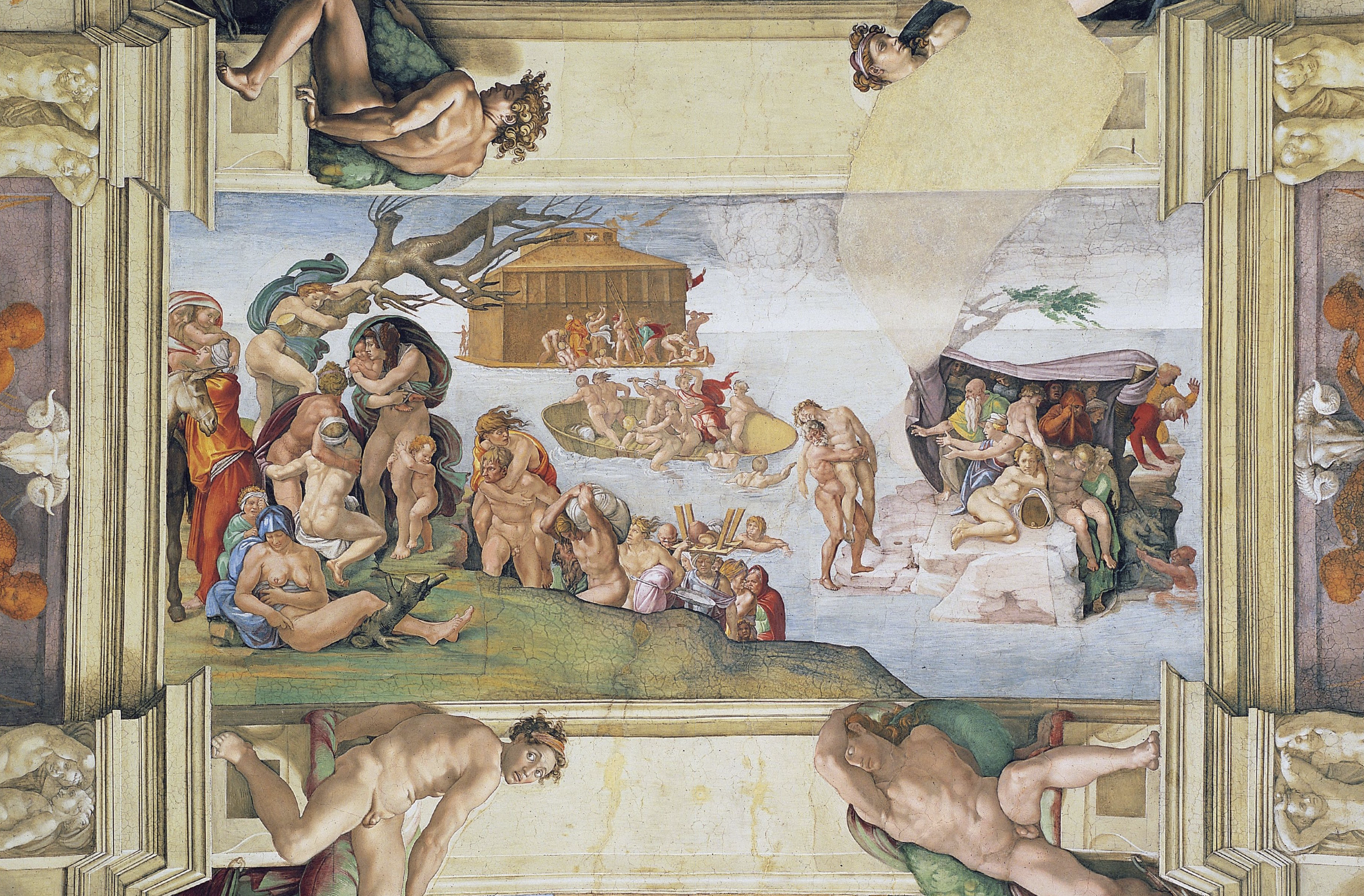
The Flood

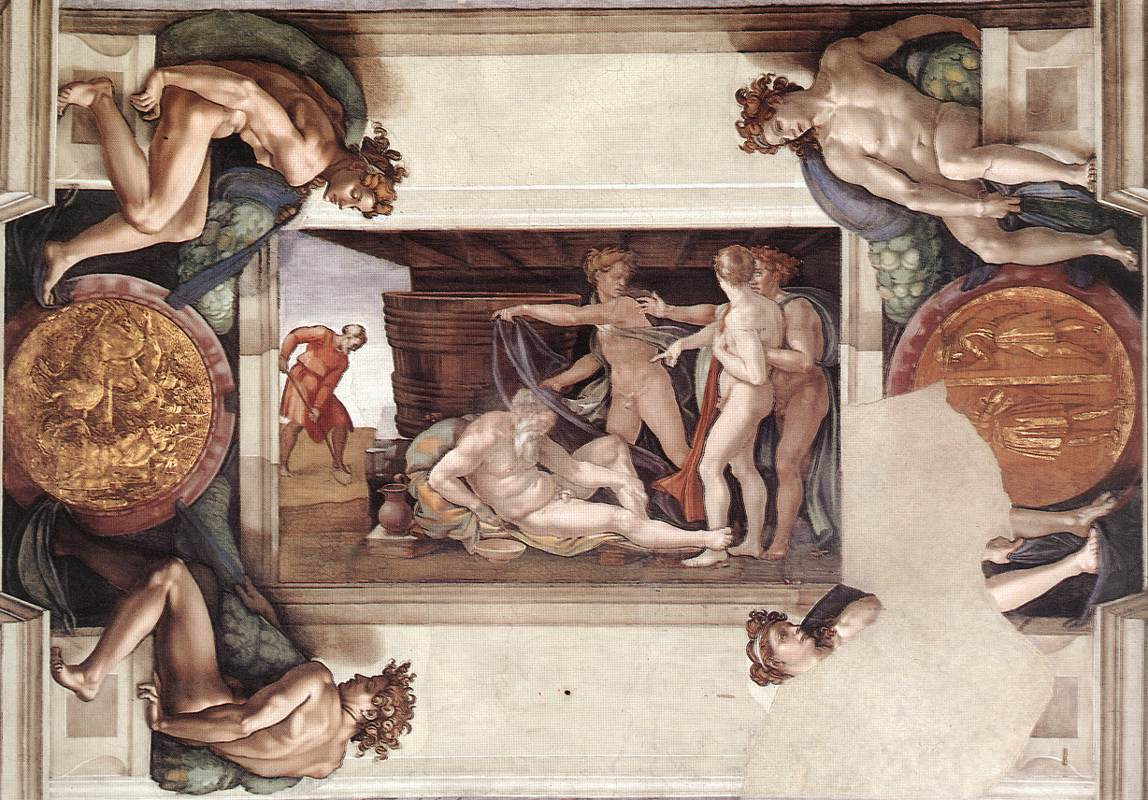
Drunkenness of Noah

==== Noah ====
As with the first sequence of pictures, the three panels concerning Noah, taken from the sixth to ninth chapters of Genesis are thematic rather than chronological. In the first scene is shown the sacrifice of a sheep. (Note: The Sacrifice of Noah (restored)) Both Vasari and Condivi mistake this scene for the sacrifices by Cain and Abel, in which Abel's sacrifice was acceptable to God and Cain's was not. What this image almost certainly depicts is the sacrifice made by the family of Noah, after their safe deliverance from the Great Flood which destroyed the rest of humanity.

The central, larger, scene shows the Great Flood. (Note: The Great Flood (before restoration)) The Ark in which Noah's family escaped floats at the rear of the picture while the rest of humanity tries frantically to scramble to some point of safety. A lightning bolt, which according to Condivi illustrated God's wrath, was smitten from the ceiling when the chapel was damaged in 1797.

The final scene is the story of Noah's drunkenness. (Note: Noah's drunkenness in context, with medallions and Ignudi (before restoration)) After the Flood, Noah tills the soil and grows vines. He is shown doing so in the background of the picture. He becomes drunk and inadvertently exposes himself. His youngest son, Ham, brings his two brothers Shem and Japheth to see the sight but they discreetly cover their father with a cloak. Ham is later cursed by Noah and told that the descendants of Ham's son Canaan will serve Shem and Japheth's descendants forever. (Note: Genesis, chapters 6–9)

Since Michelangelo executed the nine biblical scenes in reverse chronological order, some analyses of the frescoes of the vault commence with the Drunkenness of Noah. Charles de Tolnay's neoplatonic interpretation sees the story of Noah at the beginning and the act of creation by God as the conclusion of the process of deificatio and the return from physical to spiritual being.

==== Medallions ====
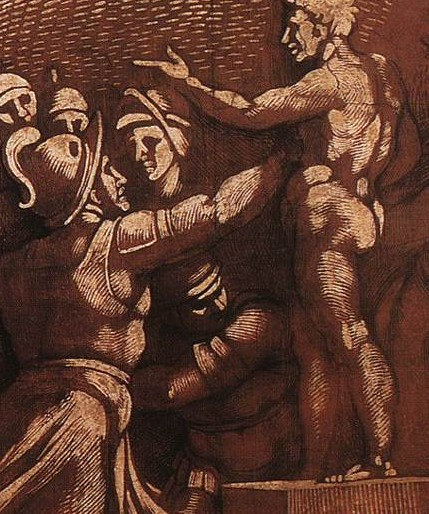
Detail of The Idol of Baal, showing the linear use of black paint and gold leaf defining forms

Adjacent to the smaller biblical scenes in the first register and supported by the paired ignudi are ten medallions. In four of the five most highly finished, the space is crowded with figures in violent action, similar to Michelangelo's cartoon for the Battle of Cascina. The subjects depicted are somewhat ambiguous, with Vasari merely saying they are taken from the Book of Kings. According to Ulrich Pfisterer, Michelangelo adapted the medallions from woodcut illustrations in the 1490 Malermi Bible, the first Italian-language Bible, named after its translator, Nicolò Malermi. The medallions have been interpreted as depicting:

- Abraham about to sacrifice his son Isaac
- The Destruction of the Statue of Baal
- The worshippers of Baal being brutally slaughtered
- Uriah being beaten to death (Note: The "Uriah" medallion)
- Nathan the priest condemning King David for murder and adultery
- King David's traitorous son Absalom caught by his hair in a tree while trying to escape and beheaded by David's troops
- Joab sneaking up on Abner to murder him
- Joram being hurled from a chariot onto his head
- Elijah being carried up to Heaven
- A subject which was either obliterated or left incomplete (Note: The incomplete medallion on the left-hand side of the "Separation of the Waters" panel)

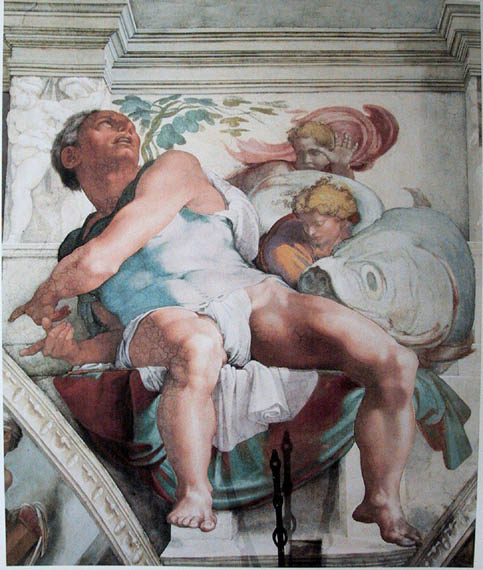
The Prophet Jonah

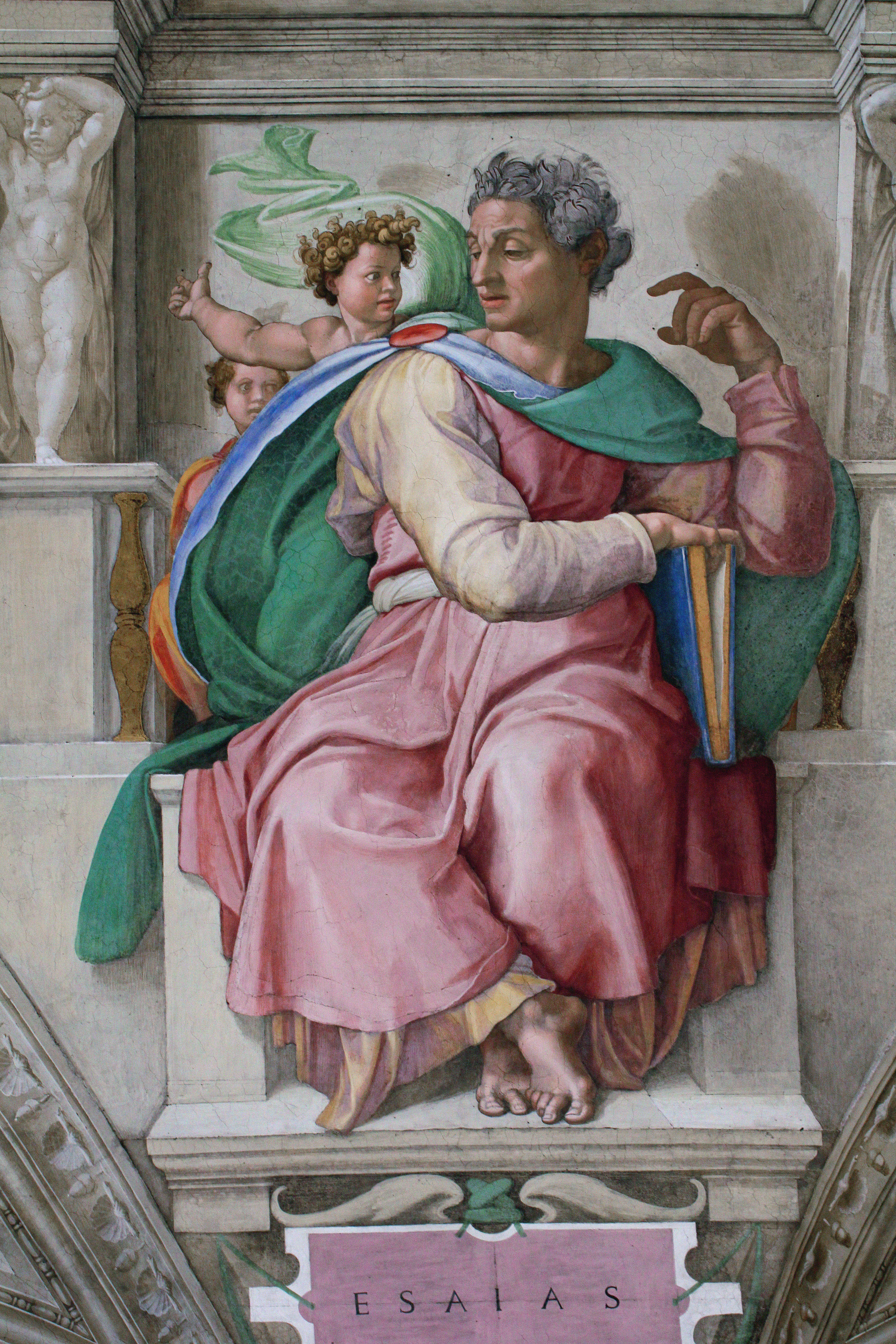
The Prophet Isaiah

=== Twelve prophetic figures ===
On the five spandrels along each side and the two at either end, Michelangelo painted the largest figures on the ceiling: twelve people who prophesied a Messiah. These twelve are seven male prophets of Israel and five Sibyls, prophetesses of classical mythology. Jonah is placed above the altar and Zechariah at the opposite end. The other five Prophets and Sibyls alternate down each long side, each being identified by an inscription on a painted marble tablet supported by a putto.

- Jonah (IONAS) – above the altar
- Jeremiah (HIEREMIAS) (Note: The prophet Jeremiah (restored))
- Persian Sibyl (PERSICHA) (Note: The Persian Sibyl (restored))
- Ezekiel (EZECHIEL) (Note: The prophet Ezekiel (restored))
- Erythraean Sibyl (ERITHRAEA) (Note: The Erithraean Sibyl (before restoration))
- Joel (IOEL) (Note: The prophet Joel (before restoration))
- Zechariah (ZACHERIAS) – above the main door of the chapel (Note: The prophet Zechariah (before restoration))
- Delphic Sibyl (DELPHICA) (Note: The Delphic Sibyl (restored))
- Isaiah (ESAIAS) (Note: The prophet Isaiah (restored))
- Cumaean Sibyl (CVMAEA) (Note: The Cumean Sibyl (restored))
- Daniel (DANIEL) (Note: The prophet Daniel (before restoration))
- Libyan Sibyl (LIBICA) (Note: The Libyan Sibyl (restored))

==== Prophets ====
Seven prophets of Israel are depicted on the ceiling, including the four so-called major prophets – Isaiah, Jeremiah, Ezekiel, and Daniel – and three of the Twelve Minor Prophets: Joel, Zechariah, and Jonah. The Book of Joel prophesies the triumph of Judah over its enemies, and includes the words, "Your sons and your daughters shall prophesy, your old men shall dream dreams [and] your young men shall see visions." (Note: Joel, chapter 2, verse 28.) Zechariah was the first Prophet to be painted.

Condivi praises Jonah, including its foreshortening. In Vasari's description of the Prophets and Sibyls he is particularly high in his praise of Isaiah, saying, "anyone who examines this figure will see details taken from Nature herself, the true mother of the art of painting, and will see a figure that with close study can in broad terms teach all the precepts of good painting."

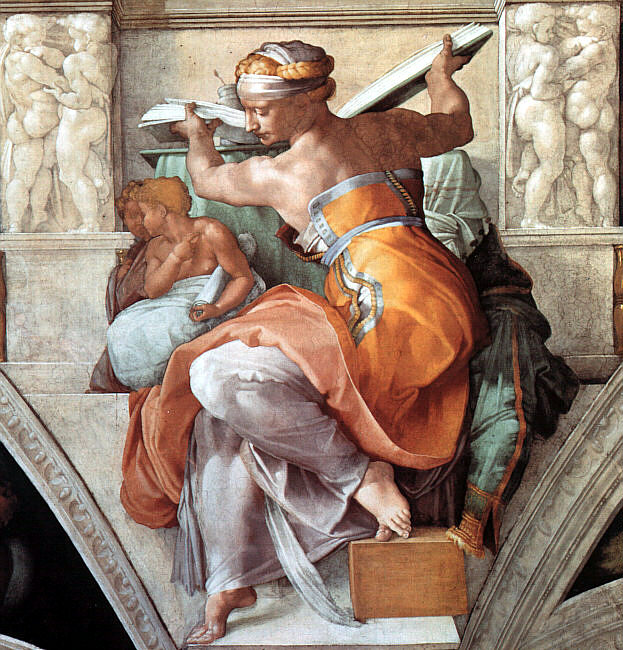
The Libyan Sibyl

==== Sibyls ====
The Sibyls were prophetic women who were resident at shrines or temples throughout the Classical world. These women were similar to Christian prophets in the sense that they were "spokeswomen for the divine oracles" and served as a "mouthpiece of the gods". Furthermore, the Sibyls embodied feminine figures that received messages from the gods and prophesized said messages to the ancient Greeks and Romans who heavily regarded their divinatory practices. Their prophecies predate those of the Christian prophets and were contextually paganistic due to the commonly known beliefs at that time.

Authors from antiquity utilized the Greco-Roman Sibyls to legitimize Christianity. The papal court generally regarded antiquity as setting the stage for Christianity. The text Divine Institutes by Lactanitus, a Christian author that was an advisor to Emperor Constantine in 280, was one of the first texts composed to legitimize Christianity and convert pagans and gentiles to the religion. In Divine Institutions, Lactantius states "Another Sibyl ... conveyed the word of God to man and said ‘I am the only god and there is no other.’", validating monotheism from the written account of a pagan Sibyl. Additionally, the Cumaean Sibyl is quoted by 1st-century BC Roman poet Virgil in his Fourth Eclogue as declaring that "a new progeny of Heaven" would bring about a return of the "Golden Age". Many people during the Renaissance interpreted this as foretelling the birth of Jesus.

This association of the Sibyls with Christianity also progresses into Christian worship in the Middle Ages, as they appeared in the Dies Irae Latin hymn produced by either the Franciscan or Dominican monastic order. The hymn utilizes the pagan Sybil as a witness to David's lineage to Christ and uses these figures from Greco-Roman antiquity to support the Christian beliefs of the coming of Christ from an era before the prophets. There was an increasing interest in the remains of Rome's pagan past within the Catholic Church; scholars had turned from reading Medieval ecclesiastical Latin texts to classical Latin and the philosophies of the Classical world were studied along with the writings of St Augustine. Thus, the presence of five pagan prophets in the Sistine Chapel is not surprising. Furthermore, this is not the first appearance of Sibyls within a Christian church. Michelangelo's mentor Domenico Ghirlandaio painted Sibyls on the ceiling of Santa Trinita's Sassetti Chapel approximately 20 years prior to the start of the Sistine Chapel ceiling.

It is not known why Michelangelo selected the five particular Sibyls that were depicted, given that there were ten possibilities. O'Malley suggests that the four besides the Cumaean Sibyl were selected for a wide geographic coverage, as they come from Africa, Asia, Greece and Ionia.

Vasari says of the Erythraean Sibyl: "This figure is extraordinarily beautiful owing to the expression of its face, the arrangement of its hair, and the style of its garments, not to mention its bare arms, which are as beautiful as the rest of the body."

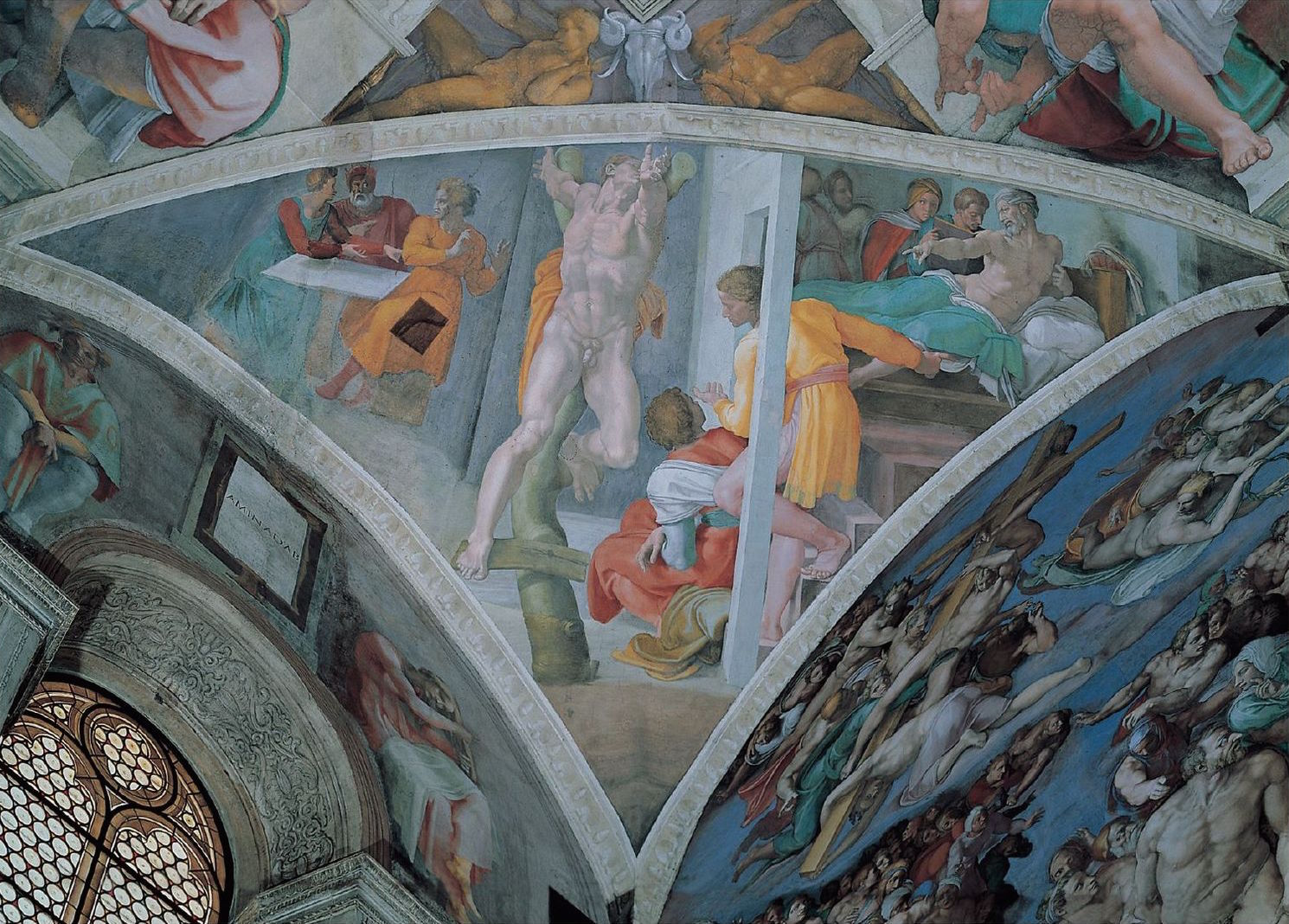
Punishment of Haman (east end, left)

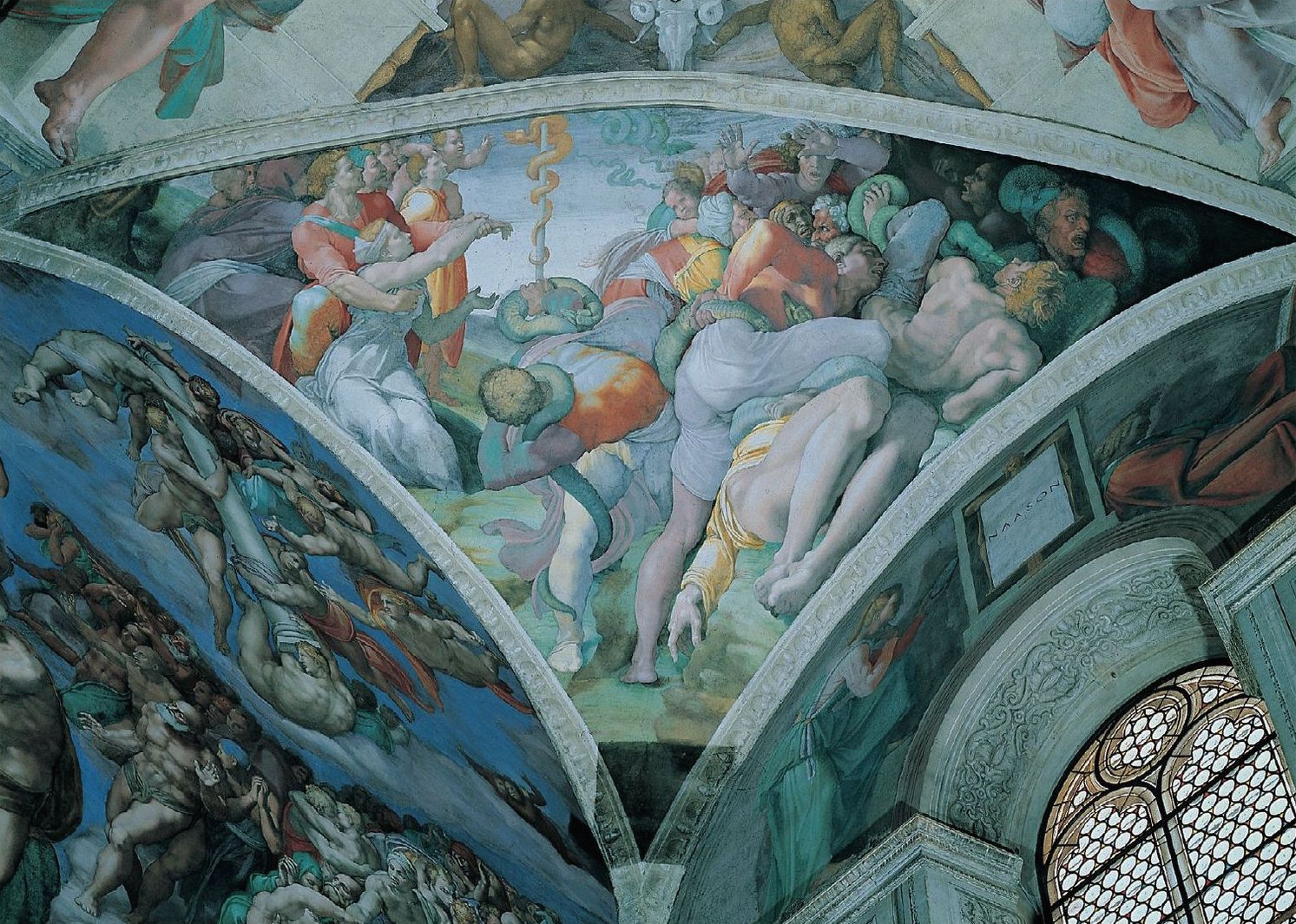
The Brazen Serpent (east end, right)

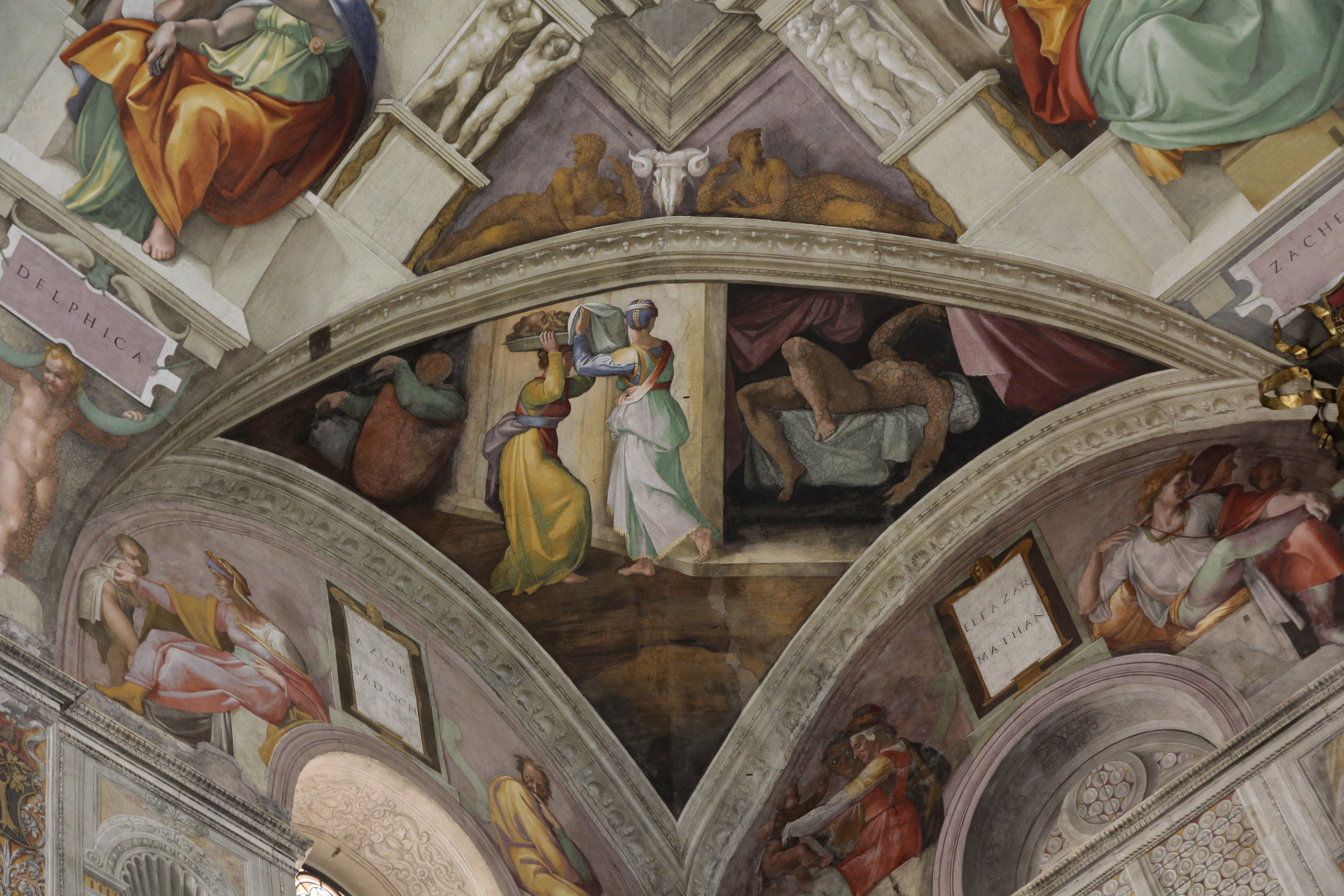
Judith and Holofernes (west end, left)

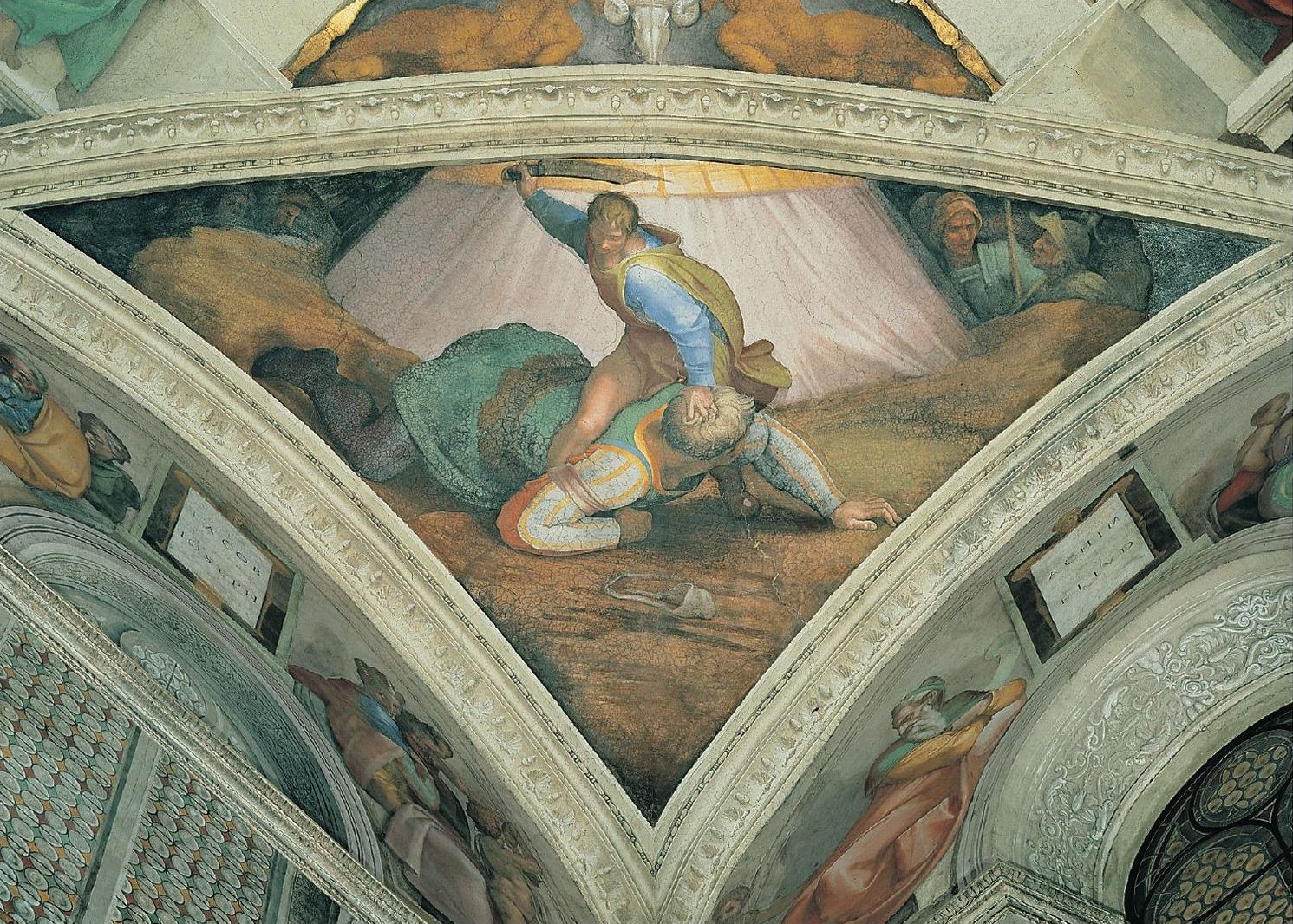
David and Goliath (west end, right)

=== Spandrels ===
In each corner of the chapel is a large triangular doubled spandrel, sometimes referred to less accurately as a pendentive, filling the space between the walls and the arch of the vault and forming a doubled spandrel above the windows nearest the corners. On these curving shapes Michelangelo has painted four scenes from biblical stories that are associated with the salvation of Israel by four great male and female heroes of the Jews: Moses, Esther, David and Judith. The first two stories were both seen in Medieval theology#Medieval Christian theology and Renaissance theology as prefiguring the Crucifixion of Jesus. The other two stories, those of David and Judith, were often linked in Renaissance art, particularly by Florentine artists as they demonstrated the overthrow of tyrants, a popular subject in the Republic.

- The Punishment of Haman – seen to the left when facing east, towards the altar
- The Brazen Serpent – seen to the right when facing east, towards the altar
- Judith and Holofernes – seen to the left when facing west, towards the rear
- David and Goliath – seen to the right when facing west, towards the rear

In the Book of Esther, it is related that Haman, a public servant, plots to get Esther's husband, the king of Persia, to slay all the Jewish people in his land. The king, who is going over his books during a sleepless night, realizes something is amiss. Esther, discovering the plot, denounces Haman, and her husband orders his execution on a scaffold he has built. The king's eunuchs promptly carry this out. (Note: The Book of Esther) Michelangelo shows Haman crucified (instead of hanged as in the original story) with Esther looking at him from a doorway and the king giving orders in the background. (Note: The crucifixion of Haman (Before restoration)) The composition shows Haman at the table with Esther, as well as being crucified. Mordechai sits on the steps, linking the scenes.

In the story of the Brazen Serpent, the people of Israel become dissatisfied and grumble at God. As punishment, they receive a plague of venomous snakes. God offers the people relief by instructing Moses to make a snake of brass and set it up on a pole, the sight of which gives miraculous healing. The composition is crowded with figures and separate incidents as the various individuals who have been attacked by snakes struggle and die or turn toward the icon that will save them. This is the most Mannerist of Michelangelo's earlier compositions at the chapel.

Writing in the 19th century, English art critic John Ruskin compares The Brazen Serpent (Note: The Brazen Serpent (Before restoration)) favourably to the canonical classical statue group Laocoön and His Sons, which Michelangelo saw upon its discovery in 1506. Both works are crowded compositions of figures attacked by supernatural reptiles: the "fiery serpents" of the book of Numbers and the sea monsters of Virgil's Aeneid. Ruskin states that he prefers the sublimity expressed by Michelangelo's "gigantic intellect" in "the grandeur of the plague itself, in its multitudinous grasp, and its mystical salvation" and his "awfulness and quietness" to the "meagre lines and contemptible tortures of the Laocoön" and argued that "the grandeur of this treatment results, not merely from choice, but from a greater knowledge and more faithful rendering of truth". Attacking the sculpture's unnaturalistic snakes as "pieces of tape with heads to them" and criticizing the unrealistic struggle, he praises the painting

in the rendering of these circumstances; the binding of the arms to the body, and the knotting of the whole mass of agony together, until we hear the crashing of the bones beneath the grisly sliding of the engine folds. Note also the expression in all the figures of another circumstance, the torpor and cold numbness of the limbs induced by the serpent venom, which, though justifiably over-looked by the sculptor of the Laocoön, as well as by Virgil – in consideration of the rapidity of the death by crushing, adds infinitely to the power of the Florentine's conception.

Judith and Holofernes depicts the episode in the Book of Judith. As Judith loads the enemy's head onto a basket carried by her maid and covers it with a cloth, she looks towards the tent, apparently distracted by the limbs of the decapitated corpse flailing about. (Note: Judith carrying the head of Holofernes (Before restoration)) The composition is vertically split, not unlike the Punishment of Haman at the opposite corner of the chapel.

In David and Goliath, the shepherd boy, David, has brought down the towering Goliath with his sling, but the giant is alive and is trying to rise as David forces his head down to chop it off. (Note: David slaying Goliath (Before restoration)) David and Goliath is a relatively simple composition, with the two protagonists centrally placed and the only other figures being background observers.

=== Ancestors of Christ ===
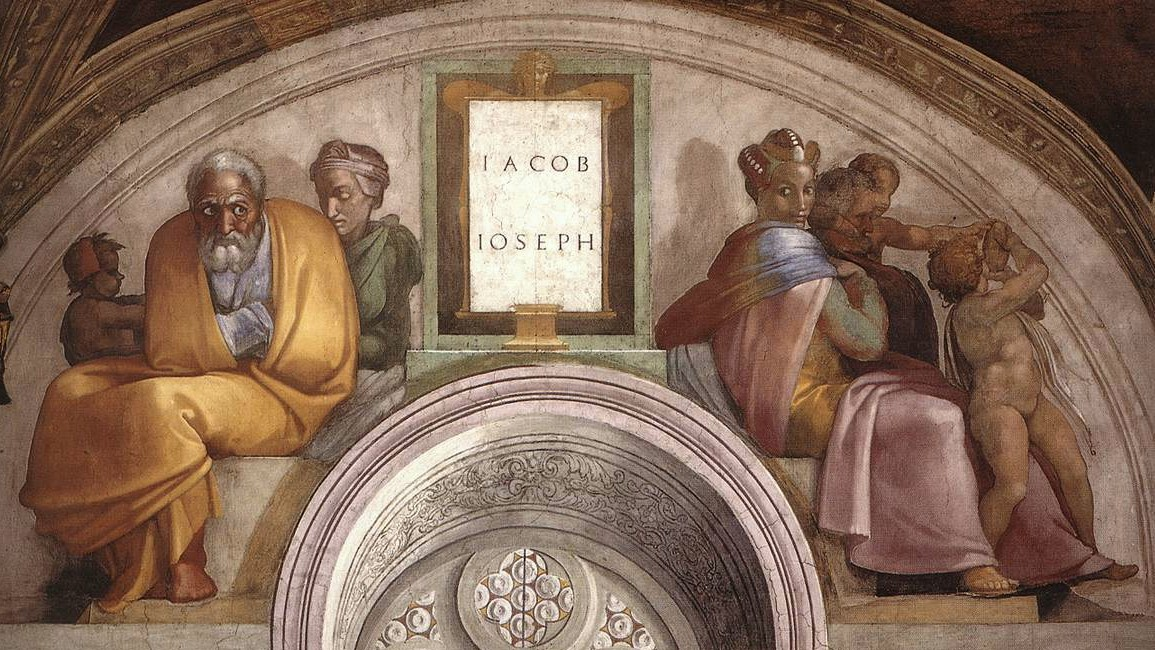
The lunette of Jacob and his son Joseph, the husband of Mary. The suspicious old man is thought to be Jacob, but resembles depictions of Joseph. (Note: In accordance with chapter 9 of the apocryphal Gospel of James, where Joseph says "I am an old man", Renaissance art used to depict him in this way. See also The Cherry-Tree Carol: "Joseph was an old man, and a bad old man was he, when he wedded Mary in the land of Galilee" (English 15th century). Traditionally, he is often dressed in a blue garment with a yellow cloak, e.g. Fra Angelico's Adoration.)

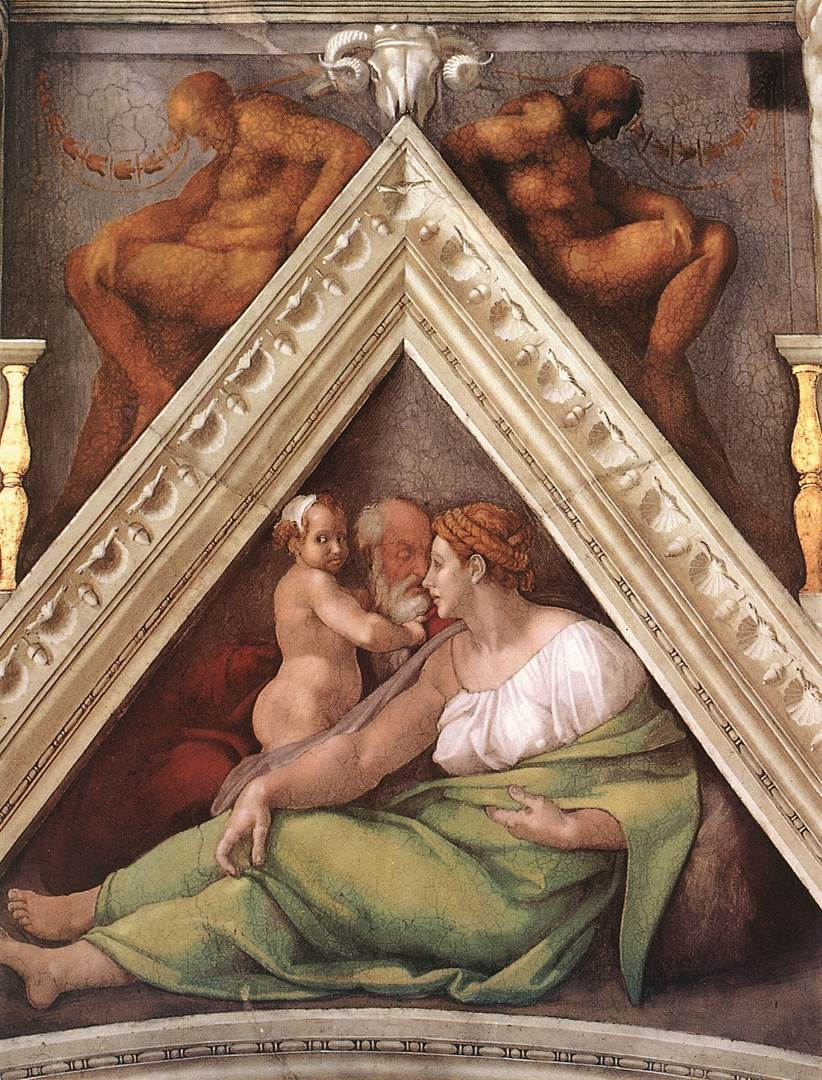
Ezekias spandrel

Either side of the chapel has six windows, as well as two closed windows at the rear, and two above the altar which were covered by The Last Judgment. Above each window is an arched shape, referred to as a lunette. Above each of the eight most central side lunettes is a triangular spandrel (topped by symmetrical pairs of bronze nudes); the other six lunettes are below the corner spandrels, sometimes referred to as pendentives as noted earlier.

These regions link the walls and the ceiling; the figures painted on them are intermediate in size (approximately 2 m tall), between the very large prophets on the ceiling and the much smaller papal portraits which had been painted on either side of each window in the 15th century. Michelangelo chose the ancestors of Christ as the subject of these images, thus juxtaposing Jesus' physical lineage with the popes, his spiritual successors according to the Church.

Centrally placed above each window is a faux marble tablet with a decorative frame. On each is painted the names of the male line by which Jesus, through his earthly father, Joseph, is descended from Abraham, according to the Gospel of Matthew. (Note: Gospel of Matthew 1:16) (Note: The lunettes specifically follow the genealogy according to Matthew, not the somewhat longer genealogy according to Luke. Over large stretches, the two genealogies differ, and choosing Matthew's over Luke's has interesting theological implications.) However, the genealogy is now incomplete, since the two lunettes of the windows in the altar wall were destroyed by Michelangelo when he returned to the chapel in 1537 to paint The Last Judgment. Only engravings, based on a drawing that has since been lost, remain of them. (Note: The destroyed lunettes: Abraham / Isaac / Jacob / Judah and Pharez / Hezron / Ram, engravings by William Young Ottley.) The sequence of tablets seems somewhat erratic as one plaque has four names, most have three or two, and two plaques have only one. Moreover, the progression moves from one side of the building to the other, but not consistently, and the figures the lunettes contain do not coincide closely with the listed names. These figures vaguely suggest various family relationships; most lunettes contain one or more infants, and many depict a man and a woman, often sitting on opposing sides of the painted plaque that separates them. O'Malley describes them as "simply representative figures, almost ciphers".

The figures in the lunettes appear to be families, but in every case they are families that are divided. The figures in them are physically divided by the name tablet but they are also divided by a range of human emotions that turn them outward or in on themselves and sometimes towards their partner with jealousy, suspicion, rage or simply boredom. In them Michelangelo has portrayed the anger and unhappiness of the human condition, painting, in Andrew Graham-Dixon's words, "the daily round of merely domestic life as if it were a curse". In their constraining niches, Gabriele Bartz and Eberhard König say, the ancestors "sit, squat and wait". Of the 14 lunettes, the two that were probably painted first, the families of Eleazar and Mathan (Note: Eleazar and Mathan lunette (before restoration)) (Note: Mancinelli notes that Eleazar is executed similarly to the ignudi.) and of Jacob and his son Joseph, are the most detailed. They become progressively broader towards the altar end, as Michelangelo painted faster and more furiously.

Because of the constraints of the triangular shape, in each spandrel the figures are seated on the ground. Six include groups of figures, mostly adults with a child. Of the two remaining, one shows a woman with shears trimming the neck of a garment she is making while her toddler looks on. (Note: Woman cutting garment, the "Salmon Spandrel" (restored)) The biblical woman who is recorded as making a new garment for her child is Hannah, the mother of Samuel, whose child went to live in the temple; the male figure in the background is wearing a distinctive hat that might suggest that of a priest. (Note: First Book of Samuel, chapter 2:18) Another female figure sits staring out of the picture. (Note: Woman looking from a spandrel before and after restoration)

In the restoration process, the figure of Amminadab was shown to be wearing a contemporary Jewish badge, the wearing of which was being rigorously enforced at the time. Depictions normally occur in a pejorative context, and seem to link this figure from the Jewish past to the Renaissance present. In this case, it appears to place Amminadab as permanently exiled from salvation.

Prior to restoration, of all the paintings in the chapel, the lunettes and spandrels were the dirtiest. Added to this, there has always been a problem of poor daytime visibility of the panels nearest the windows because of halination, the effect of bright areas blurring over less bright ones.

=== Ignudi ===
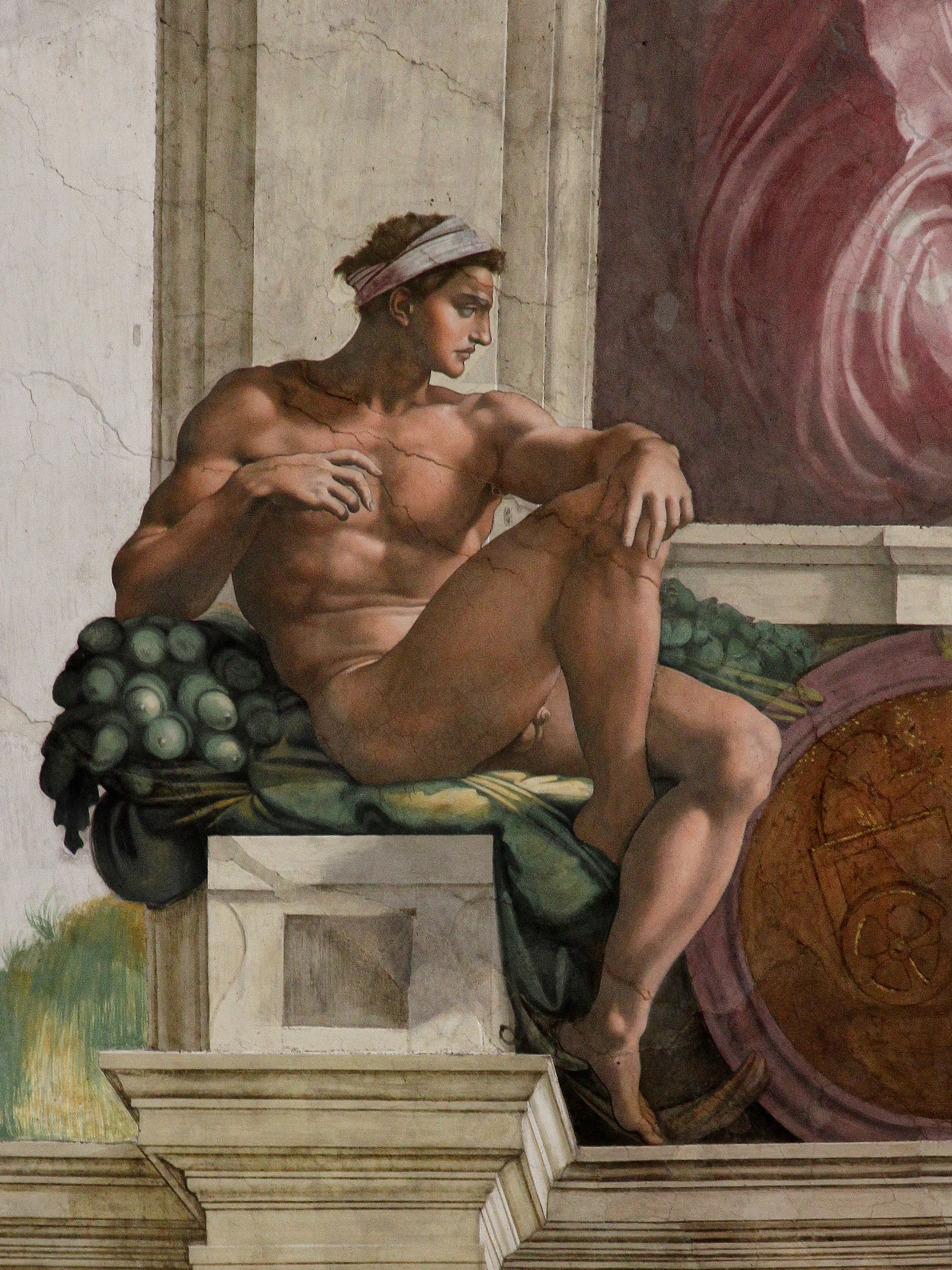
An ignudo commonly reproduced by other artists.

The ignudi (Note: Singular: Ignudo; from the Italian adjective nudo, meaning "naked") are the 20 athletic, nude males that Michelangelo painted as supporting figures at each corner of the five smaller creation scenes on the ceiling, each pair enclosing a medallion supported by ribands above the Prophets and Sibyls. The figures hold, are draped with, or lean on items like ribbons, pillows, and large garlands of acorns, in widely varying postures. Mostly decorative, they provided Michelangelo a prime opportunity to express himself. The poses were copied by other Renaissance artists, including Bartolommeo Bandinelli and the workshop of Raphael (for The Baptism of Constantine).

Some have suggested that the ignudi could represent angels, similar to cherubs. (Note: Michelangelo later included over forty angels in The Last Judgment, which it has been claimed resemble the ignudi.) O'Malley compares them to sculptures of Atlas or Michelangelo's Slaves from Julius II's tomb. In their reflection of classical antiquity they resonate with Pope Julius's aspirations to lead Italy towards a new 'age of gold'; at the same time, they staked Michelangelo's claim to greatness. Contrarily, a number of critics were angered by their presence and nudity, including Pope Adrian VI.

== Stylistic analysis and artistic legacy ==
Possible influences on Michelangelo for the ceiling
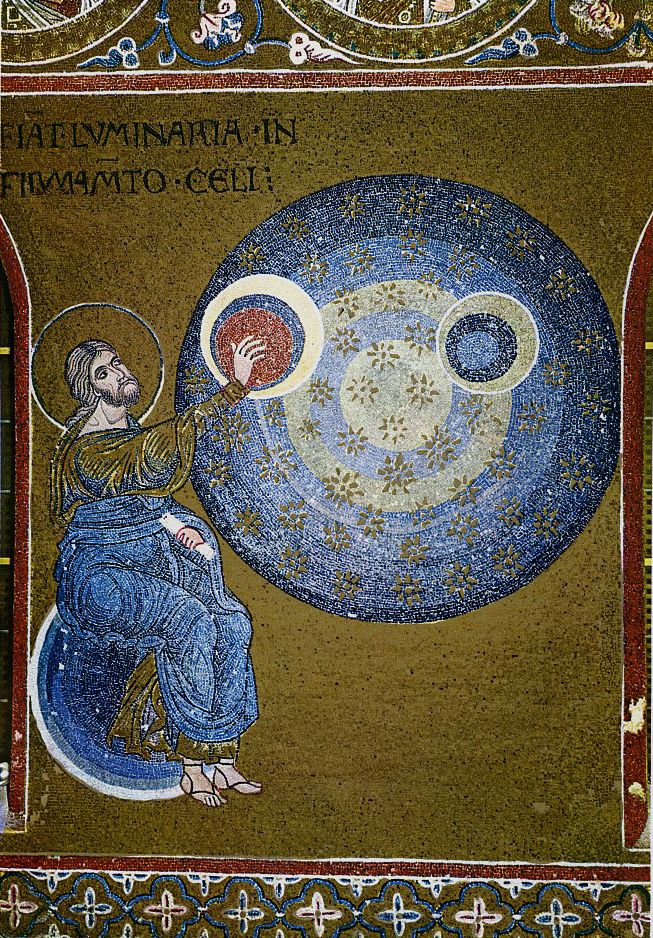
Creation of the Sun, Moon, and Stars mosaic (12th century), Monreale Cathedral

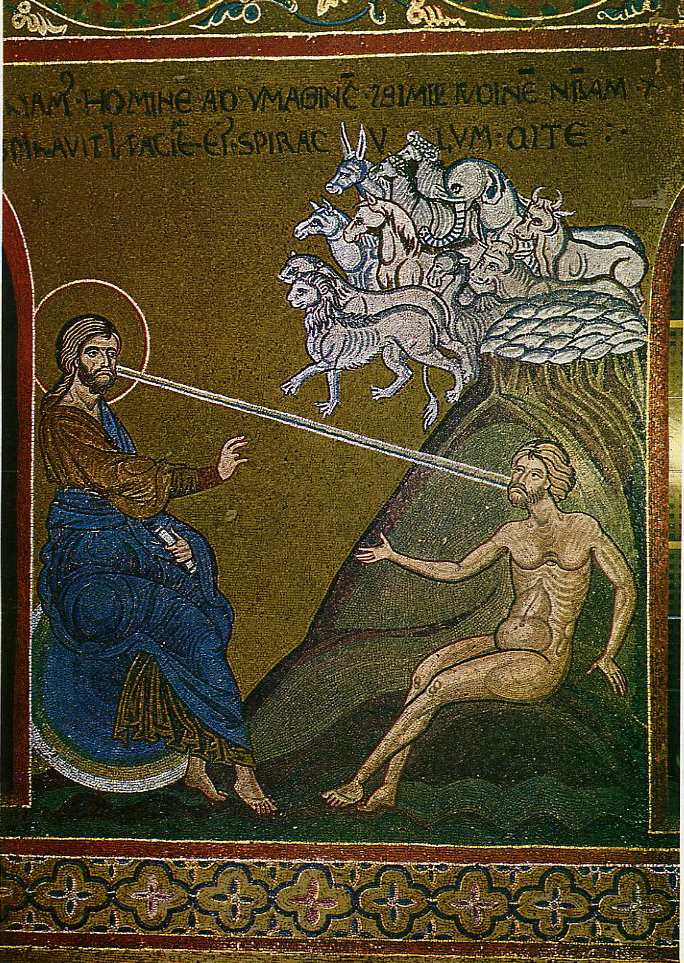
Creation of Adam mosaic, Monreale Cathedral

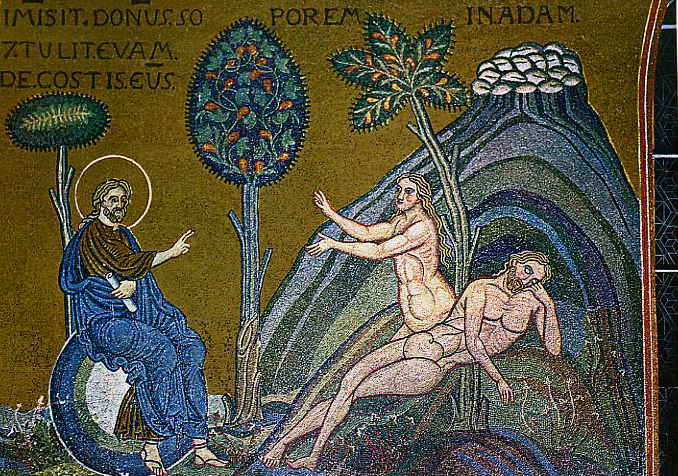
Creation of Eve, Monreale Cathedral

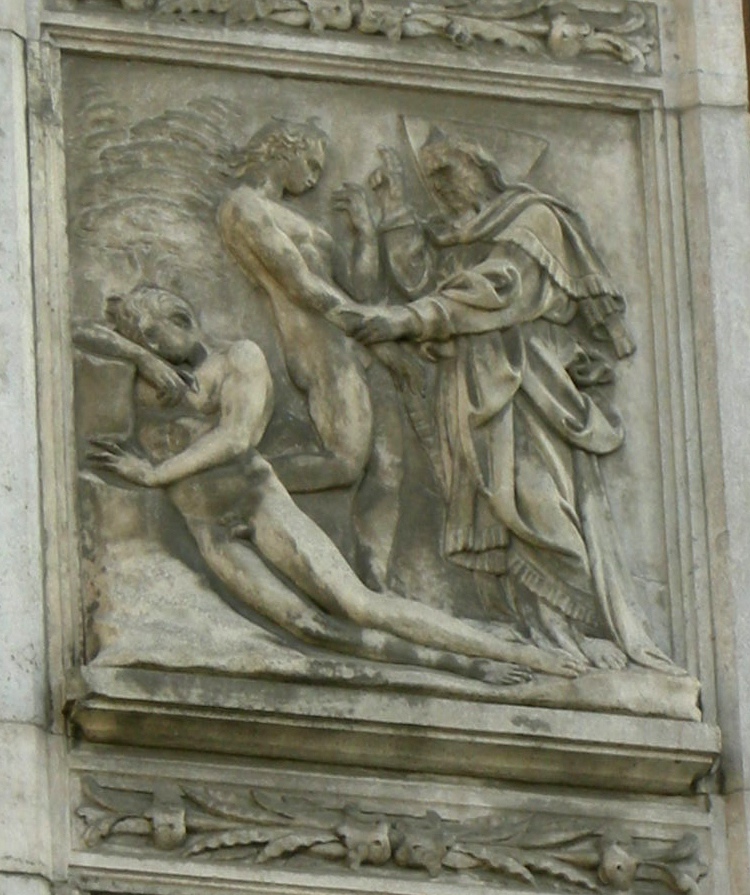
Creation of Eve relief, Jacopo della Quercia (c. 1374–1438), Bologna Cathedral

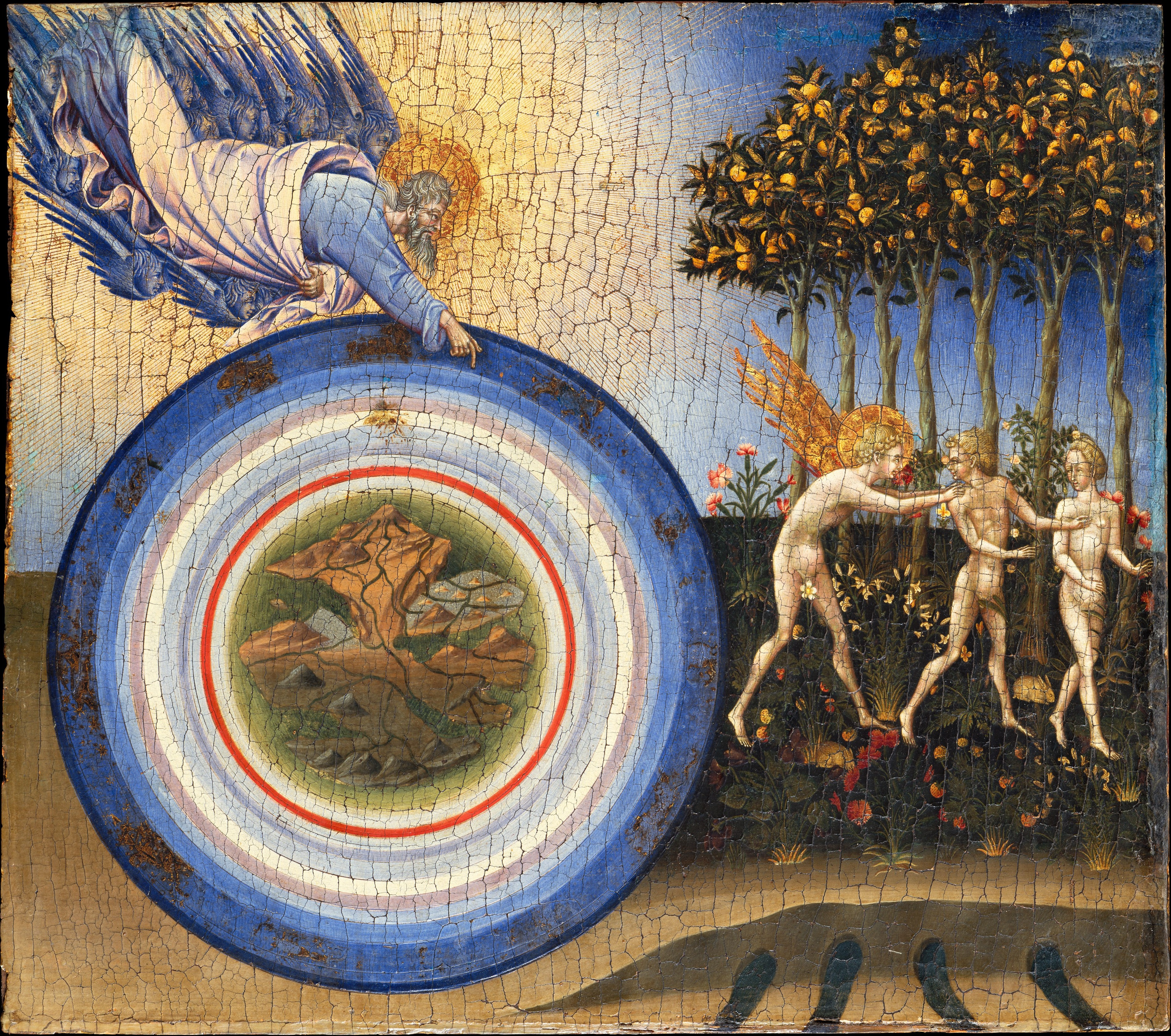
Creation and Expulsion from Paradise (1445), Giovanni di Paolo

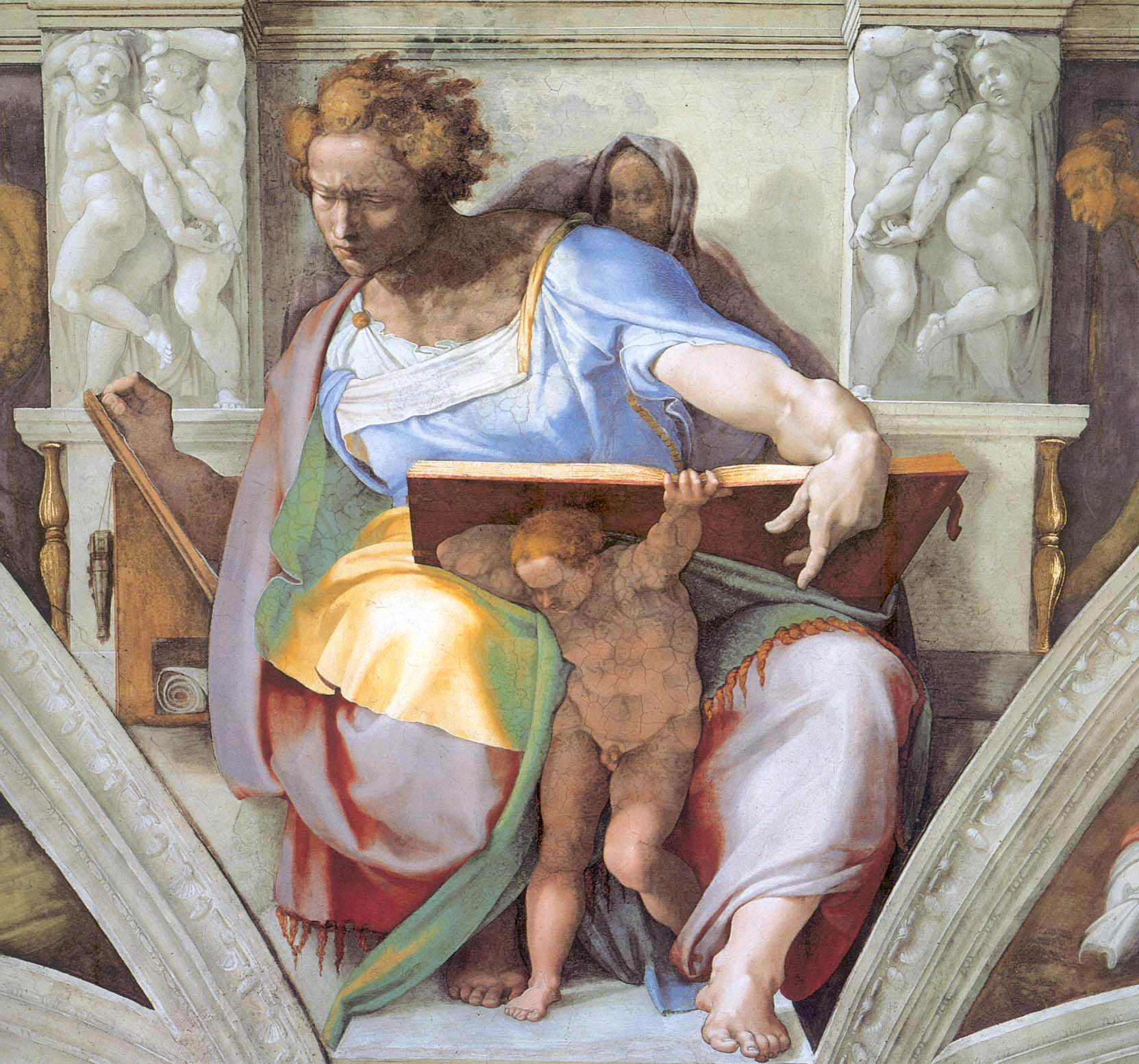
The prophet Daniel demonstrates the cangiantismo technique that was the primary painting style used in the Chapel.

Michelangelo was the artistic heir to the great 15th-century sculptors and painters of Florence. He learned his trade first under the direction of a masterly fresco painter, Domenico Ghirlandaio, known for two great fresco cycles in the Sassetti Chapel and Tornabuoni Chapel, and for his contribution to the cycle of paintings on the walls of the Sistine Chapel. As a student Michelangelo studied and drew from the works of some of the most renowned Florentine fresco painters of the early Renaissance, including Giotto and perhaps Masaccio. Masaccio's figures of Adam and Eve being expelled from the Garden of Eden had a profound effect on the depiction of the nude in general, and in particular on its use to convey human feeling. (Note: Masaccio: The Expulsion from the Garden of Eden fresco, 208 cm × 88 cm (82 in × 35 in) Cappella Brancacci, Santa Maria del Carmine, Florence) Helen Gardner says that in the hands of Michelangelo, "the body is simply the manifestation of the soul, or of a state of mind and character."

Michelangelo was also almost certainly influenced by the paintings of Luca Signorelli, whose paintings, particularly the Death and Resurrection Cycle in Orvieto Cathedral, contain a great number of nudes and inventive figurative compositions. (Note: Luca Signorelli: Resurrection of the Flesh (1499–1502) Chapel of San Brizio, Duomo, Orvieto) In Bologna, Michelangelo saw the relief sculptures of Jacopo della Quercia around the Porta Magna of the minor basilica. In Michelangelo's depiction of the Creation of Eve the whole composition, the form of the figures and the relatively conservative concept of the relationship between Eve and her Creator adheres closely to Jacopo's design. Other panels on the ceiling, most particularly the iconic Creation of Adam show what Bartz and König call "unprecedented invention"; the pair call the ceiling in general "an artistic vision without precedent".

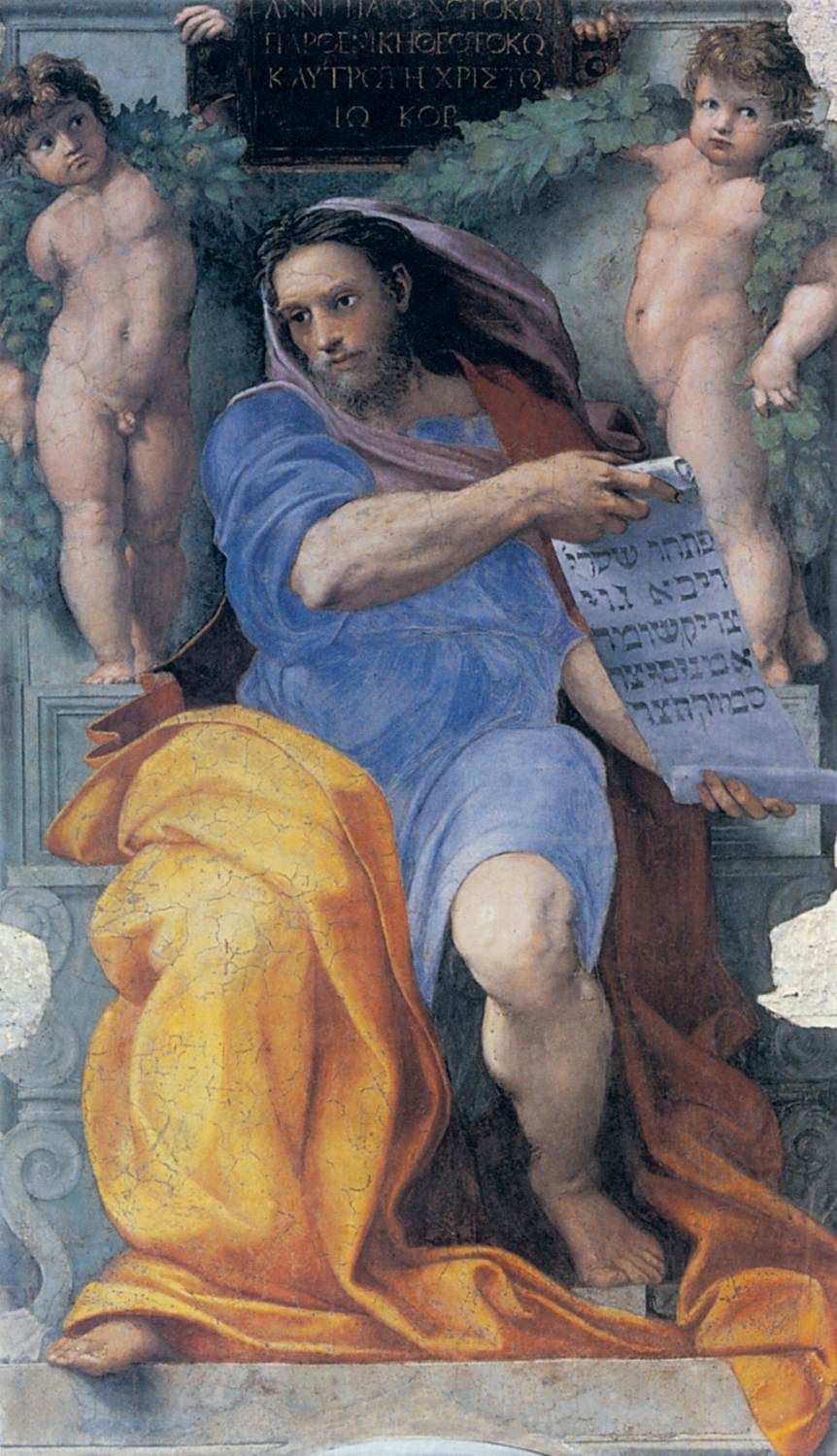
Raphael's The Prophet Isaiah, painted in imitation of Michelangelo's prophets.

Older depictions of the creation scenes had depicted God as mostly immobile, a static, enthroned image whose activity was indicated by a gesture of the hand, as in the creation scenes of the medieval Byzantine-style mosaics of Monreale Cathedral. Michelangelo, influenced by the Paradiso of Dante Alighieri, shows God in full-bodied movement, an innovation Giovanni di Paolo had made in his Creation and Expulsion from Paradise. Paolo Uccello also had shown some movement in his scene of the creation of Adam and Eve in the cloister of Santa Maria Novella. In di Paolo's painting, as in Michelangelo's fresco, God is accompanied and apparently carried aloft by attendant putti. Raphael employed movement somewhat more in his contemporary The Prime Mover, next door to the Sistine Chapel in the stanza della segnatura and painted 1509–11; Perugino's slightly earlier Creator in fresco, in the room named for Raphael's Incendio del Borgo, shows a seated, static divinity.

Michelangelo is considered the greatest master of cangiante — the technique of using different colors to represent shading, producing a vivid, luminous image — primarily because of the Sistene Chapel, where he first demonstrated the technique. An extreme example of this is his rendering of the prophet Daniel, where his blue robes darken to green and lighten to yellow.

The Sistine Chapel ceiling was to have a profound effect upon other artists, even before it was completed. Vasari, in his "Life of Raphael", tells us that Bramante, who had the keys to the chapel, let Raphael in to examine the paintings in Michelangelo's absence; on seeing Michelangelo's prophets, Raphael went back to the picture of Isaiah that he was painting on a column in the Church of Sant'Agostino and, although it was finished, he scraped it off the wall and repainted it in a much more powerful manner in imitation of Michelangelo. O'Malley points out that even earlier than the Isaiah is Raphael's inclusion of the figure of Heraclitus in the School of Athens, a brooding figure similar to Michelangelo's Jeremiah, but with the countenance of Michelangelo himself, and leaning on a block of marble. (Note: Raphael (c. 1509) Heraclitus detail from the School of Athens, a portrait of Michelangelo) Bartz and König state of the ignudi, "There is no image that has had a more lasting effect on following generations than this. Henceforth similar figures disported themselves in innumerable decorative works, be they painted, formed in stucco or even sculpted."

In January 2007, it was claimed that as many as 10,000 visitors passed through the Vatican Museums in a day, double the quantity of the previous decade.

== Damage and restoration ==
The ceiling had suffered a degree of damage as early as the mid-16th century. In 1797, a gunpowder explosion in the Castel Sant'Angelo damaged part of the Flood fresco and one of the ignudi (the latter being preserved by a drawing by a pupil of Michelangelo).

Over the centuries after the ceiling's painting, it became so aged by candle smoke and layers of varnish as to significantly mute the original colours. Some restorations took place in the early and mid-20th century. After preliminary tests taking place in 1979, the ceiling was restored between 1980 and 1992. The first stage of restoration, the work upon Michelangelo's lunettes, was performed between June 1980 and October 1984. The work then proceeded to the ceiling, completed on 31 December 1989, and from there to The Last Judgment. The restoration was unveiled by Pope John Paul II on 8 April 1994.

The restoration of the ceiling was directed by Fabrizio Mancinelli and performed by Gianluigi Colalucci, Maurizio Rossi, Pier Giorgio Bonetti, and Bruno Baratti. The restoration has removed the filter of grime to reveal colours closer to the paintings at the time of their completion. The ceiling now appears to depict daytime scenes and a springlike atmosphere with bright saturated colours. (Note: Sources showing the work before the restoration was complete feature colours which are more saturated than they are in the final product.) The restoration was met with both praise and criticism. Critics assert that much original work by Michelangelo – in particular pentimenti, highlights and shadows, and other detailing painted a secco – was lost in the removal of various accretions.

In 2007, the Vatican, anxious at the possibility that the newly restored frescoes would suffer damage, announced plans to reduce visiting hours and raise the price in an attempt to discourage visitors.

== Quotations ==
This work has been and truly is the beacon of our art, and it has brought such benefit and enlightenment to the art of painting that it was sufficient to illuminate a world which for so many hundreds of years had remained in the state of darkness. And, to tell the truth, anyone who is a painter no longer needs to concern himself about seeing innovations and inventions, new ways of painting poses, clothing on figures, and various awe-inspiring details, for Michelangelo gave to this work all the perfection that can be given to such details.

— Vasari, "Life of Michelangelo"

Without having seen the Sistine Chapel one can form no appreciable idea of what one man is capable of achieving.

— Johann Wolfgang Goethe, 23 August 1787

It seems that Michelangelo, in his own way, allowed himself to be guided by the evocative words of the Book of Genesis which, as regards the creation of the human being, male and female, reveals: "The man and his wife were both naked, yet they felt no shame". The Sistine Chapel is precisely – if one may say so – the sanctuary of the theology of the human body. In witnessing to the beauty of man created by God as male and female, it also expresses in a certain way, the hope of a world transfigured, the world inaugurated by the Risen Christ.

— Pope John Paul II

In a world where all experience was based in the glorious lost past of Antiquity, he made a new beginning. Michelangelo, more even than Raphael or Leonardo, embodies a standard of artistic genius which reveals a radically changed image of human beings and their potential ...

— Gabriele Bartz and Eberhard König

The art critic and television producer Waldemar Januszczak wrote that when the Sistine Chapel ceiling was recently cleaned, he "was able to persuade the man at the Vatican who was in charge of Japanese TV access to let me climb the scaffold while the cleaning was in progress."

I sneaked up there a few times. And under the bright, unforgiving lights of television, I was able to encounter the real Michelangelo. I was so close to him I could see the bristles from his brushes caught in the paint; and the mucky thumbprints he'd left along his margins. The first thing that impressed me was his speed. Michelangelo worked at Schumacher pace. ... I also enjoyed his sense of humour, which, from close up, turned out to be refreshingly puerile. If you look closely at the angels who attend the scary prophetess on the Sistine ceiling known as the Cumaean Sibyl, you will see that one of them has stuck his thumb between his fingers in that mysteriously obscene gesture that visiting fans are still treated to today at Italian football matches.

== See also ==
- List of works by Michelangelo
- Index of Vatican City–related articles
- The Agony and the Ecstasy

== Notes ==
Preceded by Raphael Rooms	Landmarks of Rome; Sistine Chapel ceiling	Succeeded by Aurelian Walls
