= Oakes (surname) =

Origin
- Language: Old English
- Meaning: Lives by the oak
- Region of origin: England

Other names
- Variant forms: Oaks, Noakes, Nokes

Oakes is a surname of Old English origin, meaning someone who lives by an oak tree or oak wood. It originates from the Old English word 'ac' meaning oak. The first recorded mention of the surname is in Somerset.

- Alan Oakes (born 1962), English football player and coach
- Alf Oakes (1901–1967), English footballer
- Andy Oakes (author) (born 1952), English author
- Andy Oakes (footballer) (born 1977), English footballer
- Blackford Oakes, fictional protagonist in a series of books by William F. Buckley Jr.
- Bunny Oakes (1898–1970), American football player and coach
- Cadel Oakes (born 2010), Australian basketball player
- Charles Oakes (1861–1928), Australian politician
- Charles Oakes (cricketer) (1912–2007), English cricketer
- Charles Chandler Oakes (1856–1934), American sea captain
- Coralee Oakes (born 1972), Canadian politician
- Danny Oakes (1911–2007), American racing driver
- David Oakes (born 1983), British actor
- Dennis Oakes (born 1946), English cricketer and footballer
- Don Oakes (American football) (born 1938), American footballer
- Don Oakes (footballer) (1928–1977), English footballer
- Edwin Randolph Oakes (1818–1889), Canadian politician
- Elizabeth Oakes Smith (1806–1893), American poet, writer, and women's rights activist
- Frank L. Oakes (1850–1912), American sea captain
- Fred Oakes, English footballer
- Gary Oakes (born 1958), British athlete
- Geoffrey Oakes (born 1938), English frugby player
- George Oakes (Australian politician) (1813–1881), Australian politician
- George Oakes (Wisconsin) (1861–1937), American politician
- Gordon Oakes (1931–2005), British politician
- Sir Harry Oakes, 1st Baronet (1874–1943), British-Canadian entrepreneur
- Heather Oakes (born 1959), English athlete
- Sir Henry Oakes, 2nd Baronet (1756–1827), British lieutenant-general
- Sir Hildebrand Oakes, 1st Baronet (1754–1822), British army Lieutenant-General who served during the American War of Independence
- Jack Oakes (1905–1992), English footballer
- Jackie Oakes (1919–1995), Scottish footballer
- James L. Oakes (1924–2007), American senior circuit judge
- Jason Oakes (cricketer) (born 1995), South African cricket player
- Jill Oakes (born 1984), American soccer player
- Jimmy Oakes (1902–1992), English footballer
- John B. Oakes (1913–2001), American journalist
- John Cogswell Oakes (1906–1982), US Army Lieutenant General
- John Wright Oakes (1820–1887), English landscape painter
- Judy Oakes (born 1958), British Olympic athlete
- Kaya Oakes, American poet and writer
- Keith Oakes (born 1956), English footballer
- Laurie Oakes (born 1943), Australian journalist
- Lee Oakes (born 1976), English actor
- Levi Oakes (1925–2019), American-Canadian Mohawk code talker
- Maud Oakes (1903–1990), American ethnologist
- Meredith Oakes (born 1946), Australian playwright
- Michael Oakes (born 1973), English footballer
- Nancy Oakes, American chef
- Nigel Oakes (born 1962), British businessman
- Oliver Oakes (born 1988), English motor racing driver
- Randi Oakes (born 1951), American actress and model
- Rebel Oakes (1883–1948), American baseball player
- Richard Oakes (activist) (1942–1972), Native American Mohawk activist
- Richard Oakes (guitarist) (born 1976), English guitarist for alternative rock band Suede
- Royal F. Oakes (born 1952), American radio show host and media legal commentator
- Russell J. Oakes (1909–1952), Australian dramatist
- Scott Oakes (born 1972), English footballer
- Simon Oakes (cricketer) (born 1974), English cricketer
- Simon Oakes (executive), English CEO of Hammer Films
- Stacy Erwin Oakes (born 1973), American politician
- Stefan Oakes (born 1978), English footballer
- Thomas Oakes (representative) (1644–1719), American physician and politician
- Thomas Oakes (engineer) (died 1823), American engineer
- Thomas Fletcher Oakes (1843–1919), American President of the Northern Pacific Railway
- Thomas Oakes (footballer) (1874–after 1900), English footballer
- Urian Oakes (1631–1681), English-born American minister and President of Harvard College
- Warren Oakes (born 1981), American drummer
- William Oakes (botanist) (1799–1848), American botanist
- William H. Oakes (died 1890), American music publisher

== As a given name ==
Oakes is also less commonly used as a masculine given name. Notable people with the given name Oakes include

- Oakes Ames (1804–1873), U.S. Representative from Massachusetts
- Oakes Ames (botanist) (1874–1950), American botanist
- Oakes Angier Ames (1829–1899), American businessman and philanthropist
- Oakes Murphy (1849–1908), Governor of the Arizona Territory
- Oakes Fegley (2004-), American Actor from Allentown, Pennsylvania

== See also ==
- Oakes (disambiguation)
- Oaks (disambiguation)
