= The Oaks =

The Oaks may refer to:

== Places ==
=== Australia ===
- The Oaks, New South Wales, a small town near Sydney

=== United Kingdom ===
- The Oaks, Ascot, an 18th-century country mansion later renamed the Royal Berkshire
- The Oaks railway station, Bromley Cross, Lancashire

=== United States ===
==== Alabama ====
- The Oaks (Tuscumbia, Alabama), listed on the National Register of Historic Places in Colbert County, Alabama
- The Oaks (Tuskegee University) at Tuskegee University, the house of Booker T. Washington, listed on the National Register of Historic Places

==== California ====
- The Oaks, Los Angeles County, California, a place in California
- The Oaks (Monrovia, California), also known as William N. Monroe House, in Los Angeles County
- The Oaks, Mendocino County, California, an unincorporated community
- The Oaks, Nevada County, California, a neighborhood or community
- The Oaks (Thousand Oaks, California), a regional shopping mall located in Thousand Oaks, California

==== Florida ====
- The Oaks Mall, a mall in Gainesville, Florida

==== Louisiana ====
- The Oaks (Hardwood, Louisiana), listed on the listed on the NRHP in West Feliciana Parish, Louisiana
- The Oaks (Keachi, Louisiana), listed on the National Register of Historic Places listings in De Soto Parish, Louisiana

==== Mississippi ====
- The Oaks House Museum, in Jackson, also known as The Oaks

==== New Jersey ====
- The Oaks Historic District (Merchantville, New Jersey), listed on the National Register of Historic Places listings in Camden County, New Jersey

==== South Carolina ====
- The Oaks (Coronaca, South Carolina), listed on the NRHP in Greenwood County, South Carolina
- The Oaks (Frogmore, South Carolina), listed on the NRHP in Beaufort County, South Carolina
- The Oaks (Winnsboro, South Carolina), listed on the NRHP in Fairfield County, South Carolina

==== Virginia ====
- The Oaks (Christiansburg, Virginia), listed on the NRHP in Montgomery County, Virginia
- The Oaks (Kents Store, Virginia), listed on the NRHP in Fluvanna County, Virginia
- The Oaks (Staunton, Virginia), listed on the NRHP in Staunton, Virginia
- The Oaks (Warrenton, Virginia), listed on the NRHP in Fauquier County, Virginia\

== Sports ==
=== Horse races ===
- Cheshire Oaks (horse race), at Chester Racecourse, England
- Epsom Oaks (officially The Oaks Stakes), at Epsom Downs Racecourse in Epsom, Surrey, England
- Irish Oaks, at Curragh Racecourse in County Kildare, Ireland
- Lancashire Oaks, at Haydock Park Racecourse, Merseyside, England
- Kentucky Oaks, at Churchill Downs in Louisville, Kentucky
- Yorkshire Oaks, at York Racecourse, England
- Yushun Himba, at Tokyo Racecourse, Fuchū, Tokyo

=== Other sports ===
- Oaks (greyhounds), a greyhound race at Belle Vue Stadium in Manchester, England
- Romania national rugby union team, nicknamed Stejarii (The Oaks)

== Other uses ==
- The OaKs (band), a band from Orlando, Florida
- The Oaks (TV series), a Fox television show
- The Oak Ridge Boys, a Country/ Gospel quartet

== See also ==
- Oak (disambiguation)
- Oaks (disambiguation)
- Thousand Oaks (disambiguation)
