= Noakes =

Noakes is a surname of English origin. It means "near the oaks". Notable people with the surname include:

- Andrew Noakes, British academic and writer
- Benedict Grant Noakes (born 1965), British television producer
- Catherine Noakes, British engineer
- Chris Noakes (born 1985), New Zealand rugby union player
- David Noakes (born 1953), English businessman and political candidate
- Edward Noakes (1863–1944), English clergyman
- George Noakes (1924–2008), Bishop of St Davids and Archbishop of Wales
- John Noakes (1934–2017), British actor, presenter and television personality
- John Noakes (cricketer) (1802–1840), English cricketer
- Kim Noakes (born 1982), New Zealand field hockey player
- Michael Noakes (1933–2018), English artist and portrait painter
- Rab Noakes (1947–2022), Scottish singer-songwriter
- Ray Noakes (1906–1928), executed for the murder of Fred N. Selak, the Hermit of Grand Lake, Colorado
- Roy Noakes (1936–2002), British sculptor
- Sam Noakes (born 1997), English professional boxer
- Sean Noakes (born 1995), English professional boxer
- Sheila Noakes, Baroness Noakes (born 1949), British Conservative politician and former corporate executive
- Tim Noakes (born 1949), professor of exercise and sports science at the University of Cape Town
- Vivien Noakes (1937–2011), English writer and literary critic

== Fictional characters ==
- Camilla "Chummy" Noakes, from the British television series Call the Midwife
- John Noakes (pseudonym), or John O'Noakes, or John Nokes, a fictitious name for a person involved in litigation (see John Doe)

== See also ==
- Noake (disambiguation)
- Nokes (disambiguation)
