= Benedict Rattigan =

English writer and philosopher

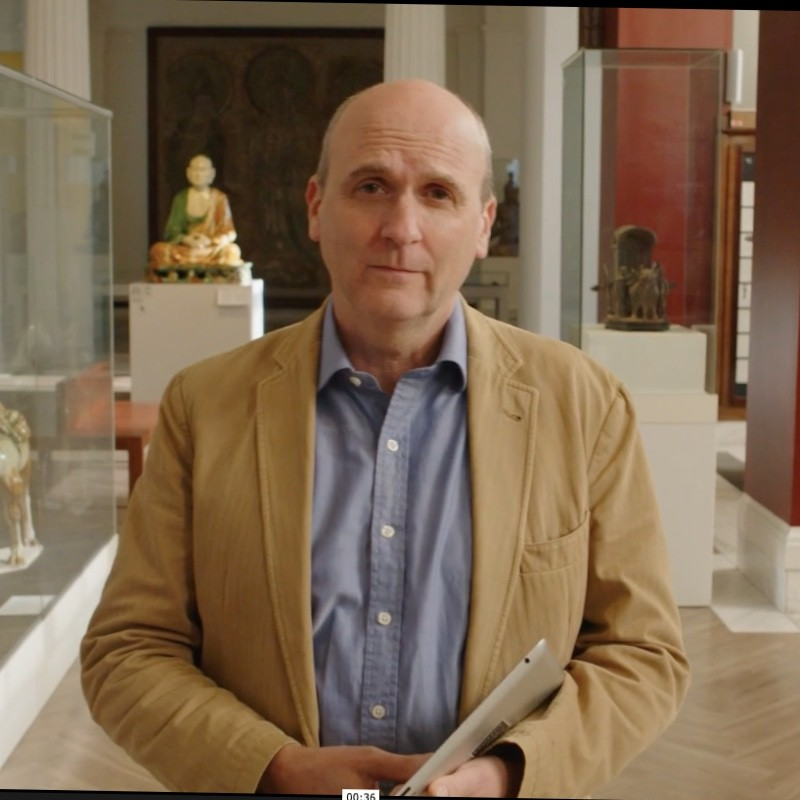
Benedict Rattigan at the British Museum

Benedict Rattigan (born Benedict Grant Noakes, 1965) is an English writer and philosopher. His theory of dynamic symmetry has been described by the Oxford University scientist Professor Denis Noble CBE as 'one of the most deep theoretical insights you could have about the nature of the Universe'. The theory gave rise to a symposium at the British Museum, 'The Language of Symmetry', in which ten leading Oxford University professors participated, as well as a Balliol College conference and a book, which was published by Routledge in 2023.

Between 1994-2004 Rattigan was a documentary film maker. As a television producer, he made films for the BBC, NBC, C4 and Granada Television. In 2004, he founded The Schweitzer Institute for Environmental Ethics, where he remains Director. Since 2024, the Institute has been affiliated with Peterhouse, University of Cambridge.

He was educated at Eton College ('79–'83) and Oxford University ('92–'93), where he read philosophy. The son of the Royal portrait painter Michael Noakes and the writer and academic Dr Vivien Noakes, he legally adopted the surname Rattigan in 2015.

A friend of Paul McCartney and Heather Mills, his phone was allegedly hacked on numerous occasions by Glenn Mulcaire at the time of the McCartneys' divorce in 2006. He is one of 46 claimants who brought a claim for compensation against Mulcaire and News International in April 2012.
