= Oak (disambiguation) =

An oak is a tree or shrub in the genus Quercus in the plant family Fagaceae. When all capitalized, OAK most frequently refers to Oakland International Airport in Oakland, California.

Oak or OAK may also refer to:

== Plants ==
- Allocasuarina, she-oak
  - Allocasuarina decaisneana, desert oak
- Casuarina, she-oak
  - Casuarina glauca, swamp oak
- Lagunaria, white oak
- Grevillea robusta, silky oak
  - Silky oak (disambiguation)
- Toxicodendron, poison oak
- Grey oak
- Various tanbark oak or stone oak species in genera:
  - Lithocarpus
  - Notholithocarpus

== People ==
- P. N. Oak (1917–2007), controversial Indian historian
- Oak Felder, songwriter and record producer
- Arnold Schwarzenegger, whose long term nickname in the world of bodybuilding is 'The Oak'

== Places ==
In the United States

- Oak, Missouri
- Oak, Nebraska
- Oak, West Virginia
- Oak Township, Stearns County, Minnesota
- OAK is the standard designation for Oakland International Airport

Elsewhere

- Oakleigh railway station, in suburban Melbourne, Australia, MTM station code
- Oak Village, street in London, England

== Other uses ==
- Donar's Oak, an oak tree believed to be sacred by Germanic pagans
- Oak & Luna, an American jewelry company
- Oak (band), English folk band
- Oak (programming language), a programming language that evolved into Java
- OAK Racing, endurance racing team
- OAK (flavoured milk), an Australian brand of flavoured milk
- Oak Industries, a defunct American electronics company
- Oak Technology, a defunct chipset maker
- Mr. Oak, a fictional character from the Doctor Who story Fury from the Deep
- Professor Oak, a fictional character of the anime, manga, and RPG series Pokémon
- Oakland Athletics, a Major League Baseball team based in Oakland, California
- Oak (wine), the use of oak in winemaking
- United Aircraft Building Corporation (Russian: OAK), company formed by merger of several Russian aerospace firms
- The Oak, 1992 Romanian film by Lucian Pintilie

== See also ==
- Quercus (disambiguation)
  - List of Quercus species
- Oaks (disambiguation)
- Oak Creek (disambiguation)
- Oak Island (disambiguation)
- Oak Tree (disambiguation)
