= Benedict Grant Noakes =

English television producer and writer (born 1965)

Benedict Grant Noakes (born 1965) is an English television producer and writer. As a television producer, he has made films for the BBC, NBC, C4 and Granada Television. In 2006, he founded and the UK branch of the Albert Schweitzer Institute, campaigning on issues relating to animal welfare, human rights and the environment.

He is the son of the royal portrait painter Michael Noakes and the writer and academic Vivien Noakes. Noakes was educated at Eton College (1979–1983) and Oxford University (1992–93), where he read philosophy.

A friend of Paul McCartney and Heather Mills, his phone was allegedly hacked on numerous occasions by Glenn Mulcaire at the time of the McCartneys' divorce in 2006. He is one of 46 claimants who brought a claim for compensation against Mulcaire and News International in April 2012.
