= Don Oakes =

Don Oakes may refer to:

- Don Oakes (American football) (1938–2025), American football player
- Don Oakes (footballer) (1928–1977), English footballer
