= Oakes =

Oakes may refer to:

- Oakes (surname)
- Oakes, Huddersfield, England
- Oakes, North Dakota, US

== See also ==
- Oakes test, a legal analysis used in Canada to determine under what situations infringements on rights and freedoms are justifiable
  - R. v. Oakes, a 1986 decision of the Supreme Court of Canada that established the Oakes test
- Oaks (disambiguation)
