= Paolo Guinigi =

Lord of Lucca in Italy (c. 1372 – 1432)

- Lord of Lucca
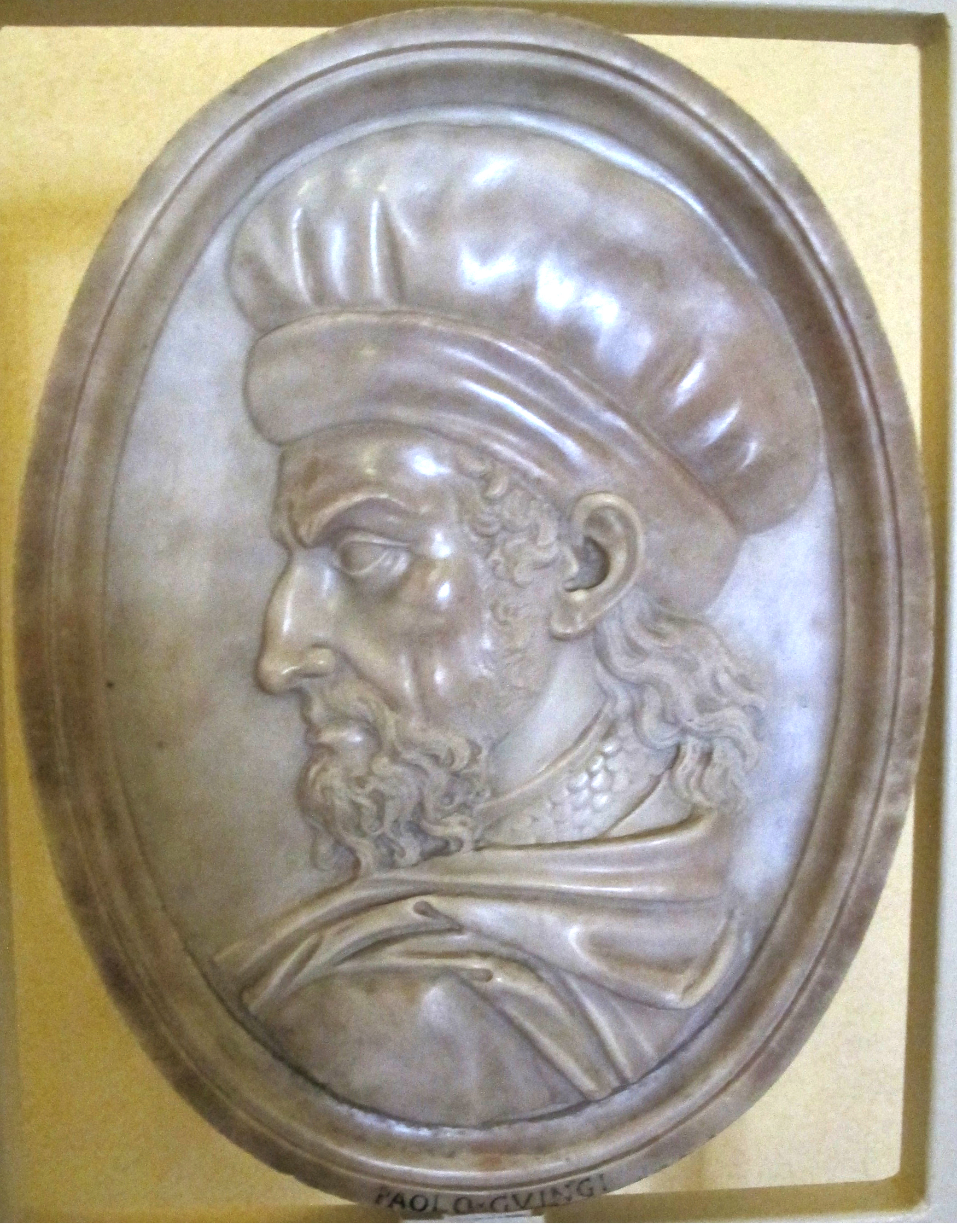
- Born: 1372; Lucca, Republic of Lucca
- Died: 1432 (aged 59–60); Pavia, Kingdom of Sardinia
- Buried: San Pietro in Ciel d'Oro
- Noble family: Guinigi
- Spouse: Ilaria del Carretto
- Father: Francesco Guinigi
- Mother: Filippa di Arbore Serpenti

Paolo Guinigi (c. 1372 – 1432) was the lord of Lucca from 1400 until 1430.

== Biography ==
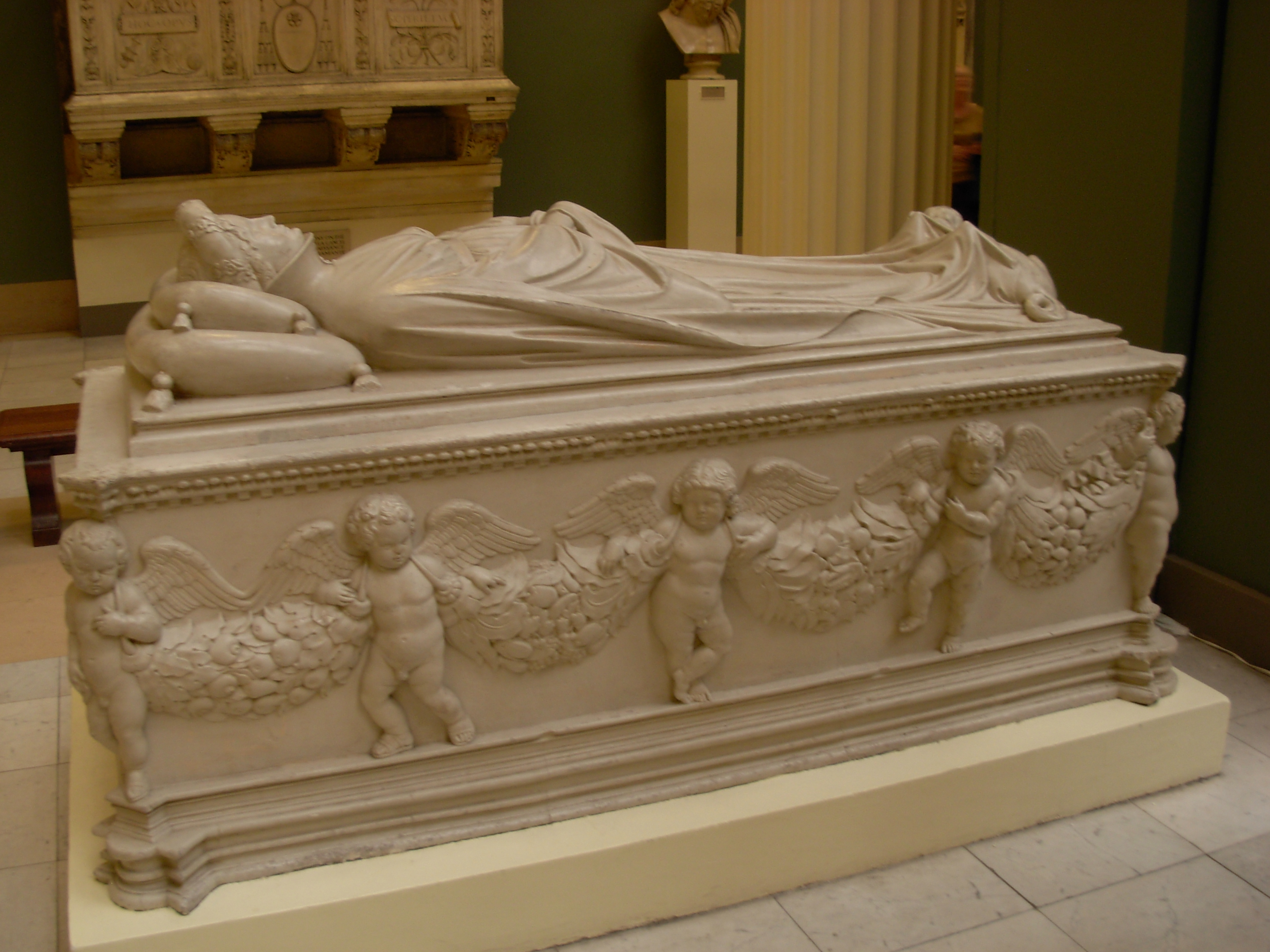
Funerary monument of Ilaria del Carretto.

Paolo was born in Lucca in 1372. He was the youngest son of Francesco Guinigi, member of one of the most outstanding families of Lucca. He was sent to London in 1389 and then to Flanders (1390–1392) to care for the family's affairs. In 1392, he entered Lucca's General Council and later held the position of Anziano (Elder). He fought against his brother, Antonio Guinigi, who had killed the head of the family, his elder brother Lazzaro. Another brother Bartolomeo and others died in a plague which had struck Lucca. Paolo also fell ill. Paolo became the effective lord of Lucca on 21 November 1400 when he received the titles of Capitano e Difensore del Popolo.

In the same year he escaped a plot hatched by his distant relative, Nicolao Guinigi, Bishop of Lucca, and he married Maria Caterina Antelminelli, establishing a link with the early 14th century condottieros and lord of Lucca Castruccio Castracani. However, she died childless, and Guinigi married Ilaria del Carretto, a member of a noble Ligurian family, who gave him a son, Ladislao. She too died early, in 1406, and Paolo Guinigi commissioned to sculptor Jacopo della Quercia a funerary monument, now housed in the Cathedral of Lucca. As a patron of the arts, he commissioned another work by Jacopo della Quercia, the "Polyptych of Madonna with Child and Saints Lawrence, Jerome, and Frediano", in the Basilica of San Frediano, as well as the Villa Guinigi within Lucca walls, now home to the Guinigi Museum.

As a lord, Paolo strengthened the fortifications of Lucca and, in 1401, began the reconstruction of the Augustan Fortress built by Castracani in 1322 and dismantled in 1370. He also boosted the commerce of Carrara marble, the bank activities and the manufacturing of silk products, calling masters from all Europe. To obtain this, he held peaceful relationships or alliances with the other Italian states, including the Papal States.

In 1429, the Republic of Florence attacked Lucca due to its alliance with Filippo Maria Visconti of Milan. The Florentine troops, led by Niccolò Piccinino, ravaged the Lucchese countryside and besieged the city. Only the intervention of Ladislao Guinigi and Francesco Sforza saved the city. However, a popular revolt followed, causing Guinigi's fall in 1430 and the restoration of the Republic. He died in Pavia in 1432.

== Bibliography ==
- Bongi, Salvatore (1871). Di Paolo Guinigi e delle sue ricchezze. Lucca: Tip. Benedetti-Guidotti.
- Lazzareschi, Eugenio (1916). Francesco Sforza e Paolo Guinigi. Lucca: Baroni.
- Sabbatini, Renzo (1979). I Guinigi tra '500 e '600: il fallimento mercantile e il rifugio nei campi. Lucca: Pacini Fazzi.
- De Giovanni, Neria (1999). Ilaria Del Carretto. La donna del Guinigi. Storie e leggende. Lucca: Pacini Fazzi.
- Altavista, Clara (2005). Lucca e Paolo Guinigi: la costruzione di una corte rinascimentale. Lucca: ETS. ISBN 88-467-1212-9.
