= Quercia =

Quercia is a surname of Italian origin, meaning "Oak". Notable people with this name include:

- Boris Quercia (born 1967), Chilean actor, director, writer, and producer
- Dylan Quercia (born 1985), American chess player
- Jacopo della Quercia (c. 1374–1438), Italian sculptor
- Julien Quercia (born 1986), French footballer
- Orestes Quércia (1938–2010), Brazilian politician
- Priamo della Quercia (c. 1400–1467), Italian painter and miniaturist

== See also ==
- Quercus (disambiguation)
