= Ilaria del Carretto =

Italian noblewoman

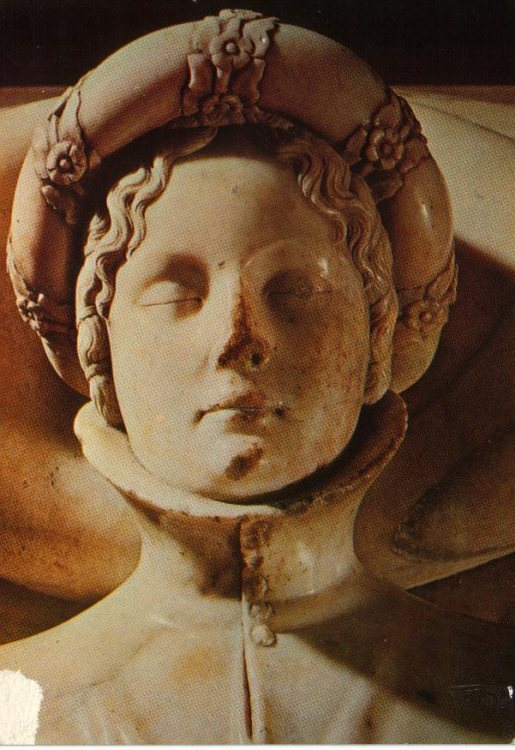
The face of Ilaria del Carretto from her tomb, sculpted by Jacopo della Quercia.

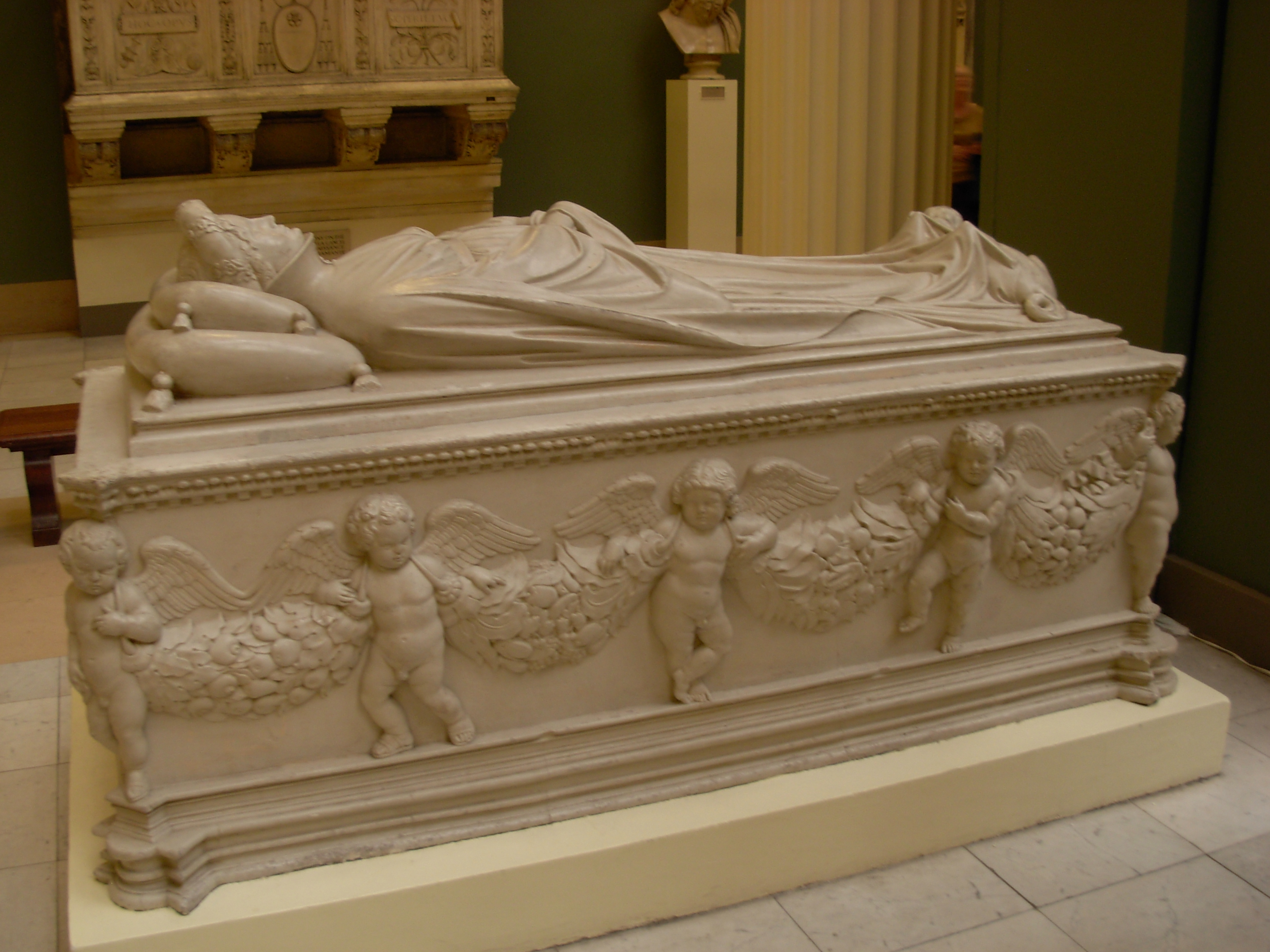
Tomb and monument of Ilaria del Carretto by Jacopo della Quercia, ca. 1413 (plaster cast in Moscow)

Coat of arms of the House of Del Carretto

Ilaria del Carretto (1379 – 8 December 1405) was an Italian noblewoman, and the second wife of Paolo Guinigi, the lord of Lucca from 1400 to 1430. She is mainly remembered for her very fine (though empty) tomb, sculpted by Jacopo della Quercia in Lucca Cathedral.

== Biography ==
Ilaria del Carretto was born in Zuccarello, the daughter of Carlo, the Marchese del Carretto. In 1403, she married Paolo Guinigi. They had two children: Ladislao Guinigi, and a daughter, also named Ilaria. She died in Lucca at the age of twenty-six after giving birth to her daughter.

== Tomb ==
Upon her death, Paolo commissioned the sculptor Jacopo della Quercia to create a marble sarcophagus, still in Lucca Cathedral. In the finished work, she reclines peacefully with a dog, a symbol of fidelity, at her feet.

The sarcophagus was not actually used, and Ilaria del Carretto is buried in the Guinigi chapel of Santa Lucia in San Francesco.

In 1991, James Beck, an American art historian and authority on the sculpture of Jacopo della Quercia, severely criticized a 1990 restoration of the tomb which removed the patina. He was unsuccessfully sued for defamation by the conservator.

The sarcophagus features some of the earliest putti in sculpture since classical antiquity, and predates those of Donatello.
