= A. O. J. Cockshut =

British academic and author (1927–2021)

Anthony Oliver John Cockshut (1927 – 5 November 2021), published as A. O. J. Cockshut, was a British academic and writer. He wrote extensively about nineteenth-century English literature and also published books about the history of religious thought.

Born in 1927, Cockshut attended Winchester College, where he played cricket. He then studied at the University of Oxford, where he was awarded an MA and where he was A. C. Bradley Fellow at Balliol College from 1950 to 1954.

He met his wife, author Gillian Avery, in 1951 when they were both in Oxford. They married in 1952 at the Church of SS Gregory and Augustine in North Oxford. Two years later, they moved to Manchester, where Cockshut taught at Manchester Grammar School. Their daughter was born in 1957.

From 1965 to 1994, Cockshut was All Souls G. M. Young Lecturer in English Literature at Oxford University (a position not associated with a fellowship at All Souls College). He was also a fellow of Hertford College.

Following his retirement as G. M. Young Lecturer, he remained an emeritus fellow of Hertford College. Until 2015, he and his wife continued to live at the same Oxford address where he had lived since 1970.

His wife, Gillian Avery, died on 31 January 2016. Cockshut died on 5 November 2021.

== Selected publications ==
Cockshut published extensively on 19th century English literature and also edited editions of 19th century authors. He also wrote on religious thought.

- Anthony Trollope: A Critical Study (1955)
- Anglican Attitudes: A Study of Victorian Religious Controversies (1959)
- The Unbelievers: English Agnostic Thought, 1840–1890 (1964)
- Religious Controversies of the Nineteenth Century (1966)
- The Achievement of Walter Scott (1969)
- Truth to Life: The Art of Biography in the Nineteenth Century (1974)
- Man and Woman: A Study of Love and the Novel 1740–1940 (1977)
- The Novel to 1900 (editor, 1980)
- The Art of Autobiography in 19th and 20th century England (1984)
- Life's Handicap by Rudyard Kipling (editor, 1987)
- Miss Mackenzie by Anthony Trollope (editor, 1988)
- Memoirs of My Life and Writings by Edward Gibbon (editor, with Stephen Constantine, 1994)
- Father and Son: A Study of Two Temperaments by Edmund Gosse (editor, 1994)
- Praeterita by John Ruskin (editor, 1994)
