= Ladislao Guinigi =

Ladislao Guinigi (24 September 1404 - died after 1444) was an Italian condottiero and lord of Lucca.

== Biography ==
He was born in Lucca, the son of the city's lord Paolo Guinigi and his second wife Ilaria del Carretto. He started on a military career early in his life and in 1425 he was hired by the Republic of Florence at the head of 700 knights, and later by Filippo Maria Visconti, lord of Milan. He left in 1428, returning to Lucca, which was at the time under pressure from Florence. He fought alongside Francesco Sforza, but was captured and detained at Milan for an unknown period, after which he lived in exile.

The last mention of Ladislao is in a plot (1443–1444) with Spinetta Fregoso, lord of Sarzana, to restore the family lordship in his home city, but the plan was discovered and thwarted. The date of his death is unknown.

== Sources ==
- Ragone, Franca (2004). "Guinigi, Ladislao". Dizionario Biografico degli Italiani (in Italian). Vol. 61: Guglielmo Gonzaga–Jacobini. Rome: Istituto dell'Enciclopedia Italiana. ISBN 978-88-12-00032-6.
