= Oaks =

Oaks may refer to:

== Plants ==
- Oak trees or shrubs in the genus Quercus in the plant family Fagaceae
- Other trees not in genus Quercus, see Oak (disambiguation)

== People ==
- Age Oks (known professionally as Agnes Oaks), Estonian ballerina
- Dallin D. Oaks, American linguistics professor
- Dallin H. Oaks (born 1932), American attorney, jurist, author, professor, public speaker, and religious leader
- David Oaks, American executive director of MindFreedom International
- Harold Anthony Oaks (1896-1968), Canadian World War I flying ace
- Jeff Oaks, American poet
- Louis D. Oaks, American Chief of Police for Los Angeles
- Nathaniel T. Oaks (born 1946), American politician in Maryland
- Robert Oaks (born 1952), American politician in New York
- Robert C. Oaks (born 1936), American general and general authority of The Church of Jesus Christ of Latter-day Saints
- Winona Oak, Swedish singer also known as Oaks

== Places ==
=== United States ===
- Oaks, Bell County, Kentucky
- Oaks, Missouri
- Oaks, North Carolina
- Oaks, Oklahoma
- Oaks, Pennsylvania

=== Other countries ===
- Oaks mountain, in Algeria
- Oaks explosion at the Oaks Colliery, England. Worst mine explosion in England.
- Oaks, Shropshire, England
- Oaks, Tasmania, Australia

== Sport ==
- Epsom Oaks, at Epsom Downs Racecourse, Surrey, England; the original Oaks race
- Crown Oaks, at Flemington Racecourse, Melbourne, Australia
- Oaks (English greyhound race), a competition held at Perry Barr Stadium
- Oaks (Irish greyhound race), a competition held at Shelbourne Park
- The Oaks, nickname of the Romania national rugby union team
- The Oaks, nickname of the sports teams at the former Dondero High School in Royal Oak, Michigan
- Sports teams from Oakland, California:
  - Oakland Oaks (PCL) a defunct minor league baseball team in the Pacific Coast League
  - Oakland Oaks (ABL) a defunct basketball team that played in the American Basketball League
  - Oakland Oaks (ABA) a defunct basketball team that played in the American Basketball Association

== Other uses ==
- Oaks Christian High School in Westlake Village, California
- Oaks Amusement Park, a historic amusement park in Portland, Oregon, US
- The Oaks (TV series)
- The Oaks (band), American rock band based out of Orlando, Florida

== See also ==
- Oaks Park (London), which lent its name to the Epsom Oaks horse race
- Oaks Park (stadium)
- Oak (disambiguation)
- The Oaks (disambiguation)
- Thousand Oaks (disambiguation)
