= Dunottar School =

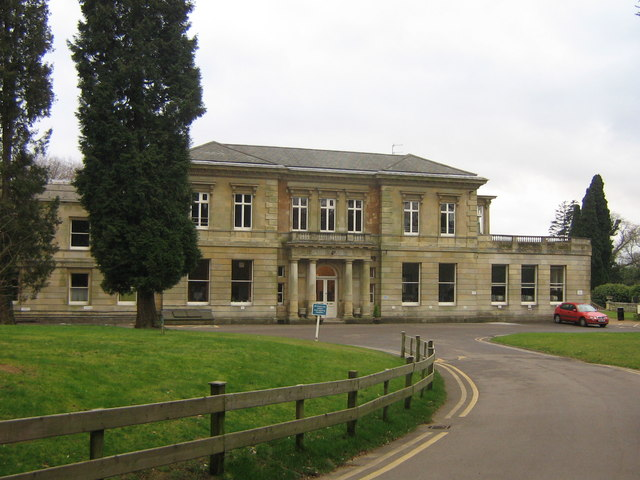

Location
- High Trees Road; Reigate, Surrey, RH2 7EL; England; 51°13′52″N 0°11′05″W

Information
- Type: Private day school Private School
- Motto: Do ut Des (I give that thou may'st give)
- Established: 1926
- Founder: Jessie Elliot-Pyle
- Local authority: Surrey
- Department for Education URN: 125356 Tables
- Chair of Governors: Andy Porteous
- Headmaster: Mark Tottman
- Gender: Co-educational
- Age: 11 to 18
- Enrolment: up to 460
- Affiliation: United Church Schools Trust
- Website: www.dunottarschool.com

Dunottar School is a co-educational private secondary day school in Reigate, Surrey, England, established in 1926 as a girls' school.

== History ==
The school was established in 1926 by Jessie Elliot-Pyle in Brownlow Road with three pupils, and was named after Dunnottar Castle in Scotland. She gave it the motto Do ut Des, which is translated as I give that thou may'st give. She chose for the school's crest a pelican mother nurturing her young. In 1933, the school moved to the High Trees Estate in a mansion called "High Trees" which had been built by Walter Blanford Waterlow, fourth mayor of Reigate, in 1867. In 1874, Waterlow remarried his younger brother's widow, Maria Waterlow (née Cross), mother of Sir Ernest Albert Waterlow. Additions had been made to the mansion in about 1908. In 1961, it changed from private ownership to being owned by a charitable trust. In 1975, it joined the Association of Governing Bodies of Girls' Public Schools, which is now called the Girls' Schools Association.

In March 2014 the school became part of United Learning and announced that it would become a co-educational school for ages 11 to 18 from September 2014. In early 2018, the school launched a partnership with Surrey Cricket to create a Surrey Cricket Development and Performance Centre at Dunottar. Other recent developments include a £2.2 million Sixth Form Centre, opened in April 2019, and the £4.5 million construction of The Castle Theatre and Performing Arts Centre, completed in January 2021.

== Location ==
The school premises is a grade II listed building, and the grounds are adjacent to Redhill Common. The nearest railway station is Earlswood.

== Notable former pupils ==
- Gillian Avery, children's novelist and literary historian
- Sue Hamilton, archaeologist
- Kate Maberly, actress and musician
- Polly Maberly, actress
- Vivien Noakes, biographer, editor and critic
- Joanna Trollope, author
