= Noke =

Noke may refer to:

- Noke (worms), a Māori term for earthworms
- Noke, Oxfordshire, a village in Oxfordshire, England
- NOKE, a shopping mall in Taipei, Taiwan
- Noke Station, a subway station in Fukuoka, Japan

== People ==
- Billy Noke (born 1963), Australian rugby footballer
- Charles Noke (1858–1941), English pottery designer and artist
- Kyle Noke (born 1980), Australian professional mixed martial artist
- Tikiko Noke (born 1994), Fijian rugby league footballer

== See also ==
- Nokes (disambiguation)
