= Oak Tree =

Oak Tree or oaktree may refer to:

- Oak tree, a tree or shrub in the genus Quercus
- An Oak Tree, a 1973 conceptual work of art by Michael Craig-Martin
- Oak Tree, County Durham, a village in County Durham, England
- Oak Tree Village, California, an unincorporated community in El Dorado County
- Oak Tree, New Jersey, an unincorporated community in Middlesex County
- Oaktree Capital Management, a global asset management firm
- The Oaktree Foundation, a youth-run aid and development agency
- Oak Tree Press, a small not-for-profit publishing house
- Oak Tree National, a golf club in Edmond, Oklahoma
- Oak Tree Grand Prix, a sports car race held at the Virginia International Raceway in Alton, Virginia
- Oaktree Arena, a speedway racing track located near Highbridge, Somerset, England
- OakTree Software, software developers of the Bible study program Accordance
- "The Oak Tree," a song by Morris Day
- Demetrius Edwards, a boxer known by the nickname "Oaktree"

== Horse racing ==
- Oak Tree Stakes, a flat horse race in Great Britain
- Oak Tree Racing Association, a corporation that promotes Thoroughbred horse racing in Southern California, several races at Santa Anita Park including:
  - Oak Tree Derby, a race for thoroughbred horses run at Santa Anita Park
  - Oak Tree Mile Stakes, a former name of the City of Hope Stakes, a Thoroughbred horse race at Santa Anita Park
  - Oak Tree Invitational Stakes, or Oak Tree Stakes, a former name of the John Henry Turf Championship Stakes

== See also ==
- Oak (disambiguation)
