= Noake =

Noake is a surname. Notable people with the surname include:

- Hana Noake (born 2004), Japanese speed skater
- Hiroyuki Noake (born 1974), Japanese speed skater
- John Noake (1816–1894), English journalist and antiquary
- William Noake (1690–1737), High Sheriff of Berkshire, England

== See also ==
- Noakes
