= Martino di Bartolomeo =

Italian painter (fl. 1389–1434)

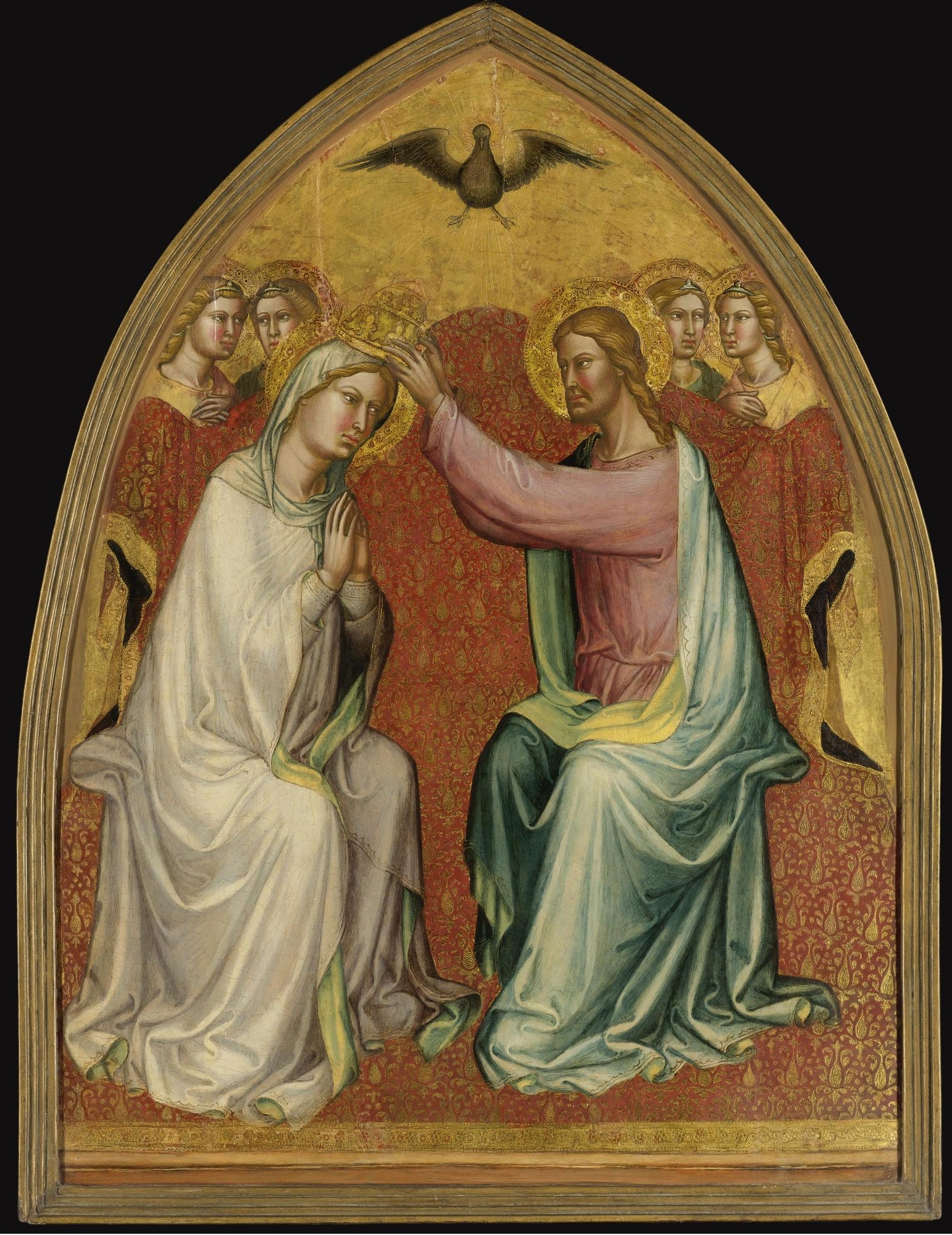
Coronation of the Virgin, on panel, ca. 1400, (Los Angeles County Museum of Art).

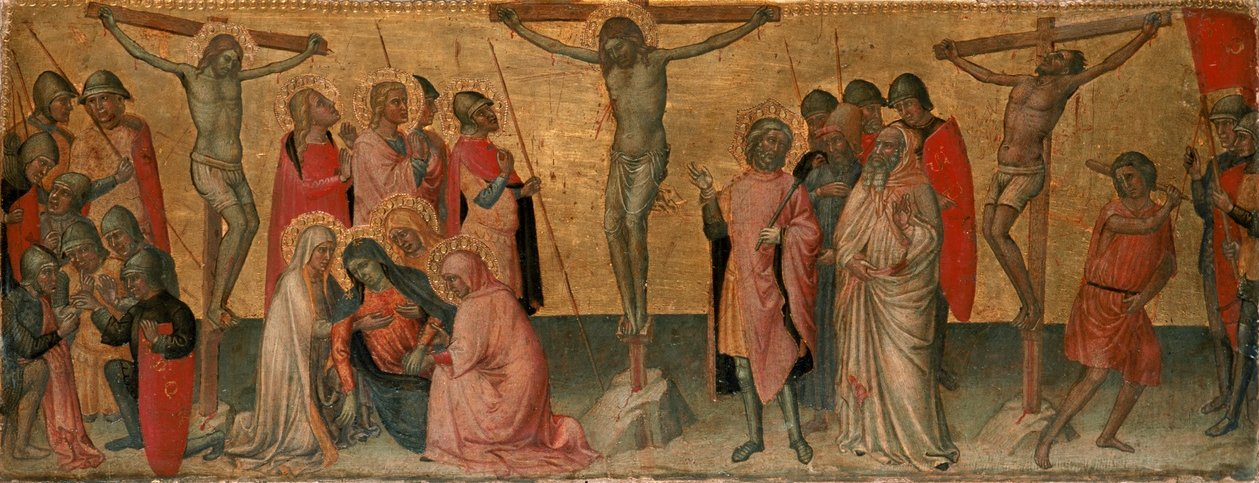
Crucifixion on panel, ca. 1390 (Lindenau Museum, Altenburg, Germany).

Martino di Bartolomeo or Martino di Bartolomeo di Biagio was an Italian painter and manuscript illuminator active between 1389 and 1434. He was one of his generation's principal painters of the Sienese School. From specific aspects of his early style, he is believed to have trained in the studio of Taddeo di Bartolo. As a young man Martino collaborated with Giovanni di Pietro da Napoli (active 1402-1405) in Pisa. The fresco cycle in the church of San Giovanni Battista di Cascina, outside Pisa, bears Martino’s signature, and the date 1398. He returned permanently to Siena in 1405; there he painted several prominent fresco cycles in the Duomo and the Palazzo Pubblico. Further official commissions for altarpieces and for polychromy of sculptures attest to his versatility and to his prestige as one of the city’s official artists.

Martino's early activity as an illuminator of manuscripts is based on Luciano Bellosi's recognition of his hand in the set of choirbooks commissioned for the cathedral of Lucca by its bishop, Niccolò Guinigi, in 1394.

When he contracted with the Collegiata of San Gimignano for the polychromy of the carved wooden Annunciation in 1420, the sculptor, Jacopo della Quercia, stood guarantor. Jacopo's father, Pietro di Angiolo, worked in Martino's shop.
