= Gillian Avery =

English children's writer and children's literature scholar

- Born: Gillian Elise Avery; 30 September 1926; Reigate, England
- Died: 31 January 2016 (aged 89)
- Education: Dunottar School
- Occupations: novelist and historian
- Spouse: A. O. J. Cockshut (m. 1952)
- Writing career
- Notable awards: Guardian Children's Fiction Prize (1972)

Gillian Elise Avery (30 September 1926 – 31 January 2016) was a British children's novelist, and a historian of childhood education and children's literature. She won the Guardian Children's Fiction Prize in 1972 for A Likely Lad. It was adapted for television in 1990.

== Personal life and education ==
Avery was born 30 September 1926 in Reigate, Surrey and attended Dunottar School.

In 1952, she married the literary scholar A. O. J. Cockshut, with whom she moved to Manchester, returning to Oxford in 1964.

Avery died in January 2016 at the age of 89.

== Career ==
Avery worked first as a journalist on the Surrey Mirror, then for Chambers's Encyclopaedia and Oxford University Press.

She is the author of several studies of the history of education and of children's literature, and that scholarly interest is reflected in her own books for children, which are set in Victorian England. The first, The Warden's Niece (1957), is a witty adventure story in which Maria runs away from her stultifying boarding school to live with her great-uncle, the head of an Oxford college. Impressed by her academic ambitions (she wants to become Professor of Greek), he decides to let her stay, and she proves her abilities as a researcher by uncovering a piece of history from the English Civil War.

Characters from The Warden's Niece reappear in The Elephant War (1960), which is about an attempt by the London Zoo to prevent the sale of Jumbo to P. T. Barnum, and in The Italian Spring (1962).

Besides winning the Guardian Prize for A Likely Lad, Avery was three times a commended runner-up for the Carnegie Medal from the Library Association, which recognises the year's best children's book by a British writer: for The Warden's Niece (1957), The Greatest Gresham (1962) and A Likely Lad (1971). (Note: Since 1995 there are usually eight books on the Carnegie shortlist. According to CCSU, some runners up through 2002 were Commended (from 1955) or Highly Commended (from 1966); the Highly Commended distinction became approximately annual in 1979. There were about 160 commendations of both kinds in 48 years including six for 1957, six 1962 and three 1971 (no high commendations).)

== Selected works ==
=== Children's books ===
- The Warden's Niece (1957, U.S. 1963) ‡
- Trespassers at Charlcote (1958)
- James Without Thomas (1959)
- The Elephant War (1960, U.S. 1971), illustrated by John Verney ‡
- To Tame a Sister (1961), illustrated by John Verney
- The Greatest Gresham (1962)
- The Peacock House (1963)
- The Italian Spring (1964, U.S. 1972), illustrated by John Verney ‡
- Call of the Valley (1968)
- A Likely Lad (Collins, 1971), illustrated by Faith Jaques
- Ellen's Birthday (1971)
- Ellen and the Queen (1972), illustrated by Krystyna Turska
- Huck and her Time Machine (1977)
- Mouldy's Orphan (1978), illustrated by Faith Jaques
- Sixpence, illustrated by Antony Maitland, published by Collins "Young Fiction" 1979

‡ The Warden's Niece and its sequels The Elephant War and The Italian Spring were published in the U.S. several years after their first editions. The first and third were reissued many years later as Maria Escapes (1992) and Maria's Italian Spring (1993).
Naomi Lewis reviewed The Elephant War as "the fourth of this author's witty and exhilarating stories about children and their elders living in Victorian Oxfordshire. The dialogue alone would make them a pleasure to read—though, since most of the fathers are wardens or dons, the reader does need to be a fairly literate child." The Observer, 11 December 1960, p. 28.

=== Non-fiction ===
- Mrs Ewing (London: Bodley Head, 1961) —about Juliana Horatia Ewing
- Childhood's Pattern: A Study of the Heroes and Heroines of Children's Fiction, 1770–1950 (London: Hodder & Stoughton, 1975)
- Co-edited with Julia Briggs, Children and Their Books: a Celebration of the Work of Iona and Peter Opie (Oxford University Press, 1989)
- The Best Type of Girl: A History of Girls' Independent Schools (London, 1991)
- Behold the Child: American Children and Their Books, 1621–1922 (Baltimore: Johns Hopkins University Press, 1994)
- Cheltenham Ladies: An Illustrated History of the Cheltenham Ladies' College (London: James & James Ltd, 2003)

=== As editor ===
- The Echoing Green. Memories of Regency and Victorian Youth (London: Collins, 1974)
- The Journal of Emily Pepys (London: Prospect, 1984)
