= Quercus (disambiguation) =

Quercus or oak, is a genus of trees and shrubs.

Quercus may also refer to:

== Organization ==
- Quercus (organization), a Portuguese association for the conservation of the natural environment
- Quercus (publisher), a British publishing house
- Quercus, developer of a Rexx interpreter

== Other uses ==
- Quercus (software), a Java implementation of the PHP language
- Quercus (album), a 2013 album by June Tabor, Huw Warren & Iain Ballamy

== See also ==
- List of Quercus species
- Quercia (disambiguation)
