= Nokes =

Nokes is a surname. Notable people with the surname include:

- Caroline Nokes (born 1972), British politician
- David Nokes (1948–2009), English literature scholar
- Emily Nokes, American writer, artist, music critic and musician
- Ethel Nokes (1883–1976), British children's writer
- George Augustus Nokes (1867–1948), founding editor of the Railway Magazine, who used the pen name G. A. Sekon
- Hannah Nokes (1898–1972), American transgender pioneer
- James Nokes (died c.1692), English actor
- Malcolm Nokes (1897–1986), British schoolteacher, soldier, research scientist and Olympic athlete
- Matt Nokes (born 1963), American baseball player
- Rhian Nokes (born 1989), Welsh footballer and rugby player
- Roger Nokes (born 1958), New Zealand professor of engineering

== See also ==
- Noakes (disambiguation)
- Noke (disambiguation)
- Sodium dithiophosphate, aka Nokes' reagent
