= Jacopo della Quercia =

Italian sculptor (c. 1374–1438)

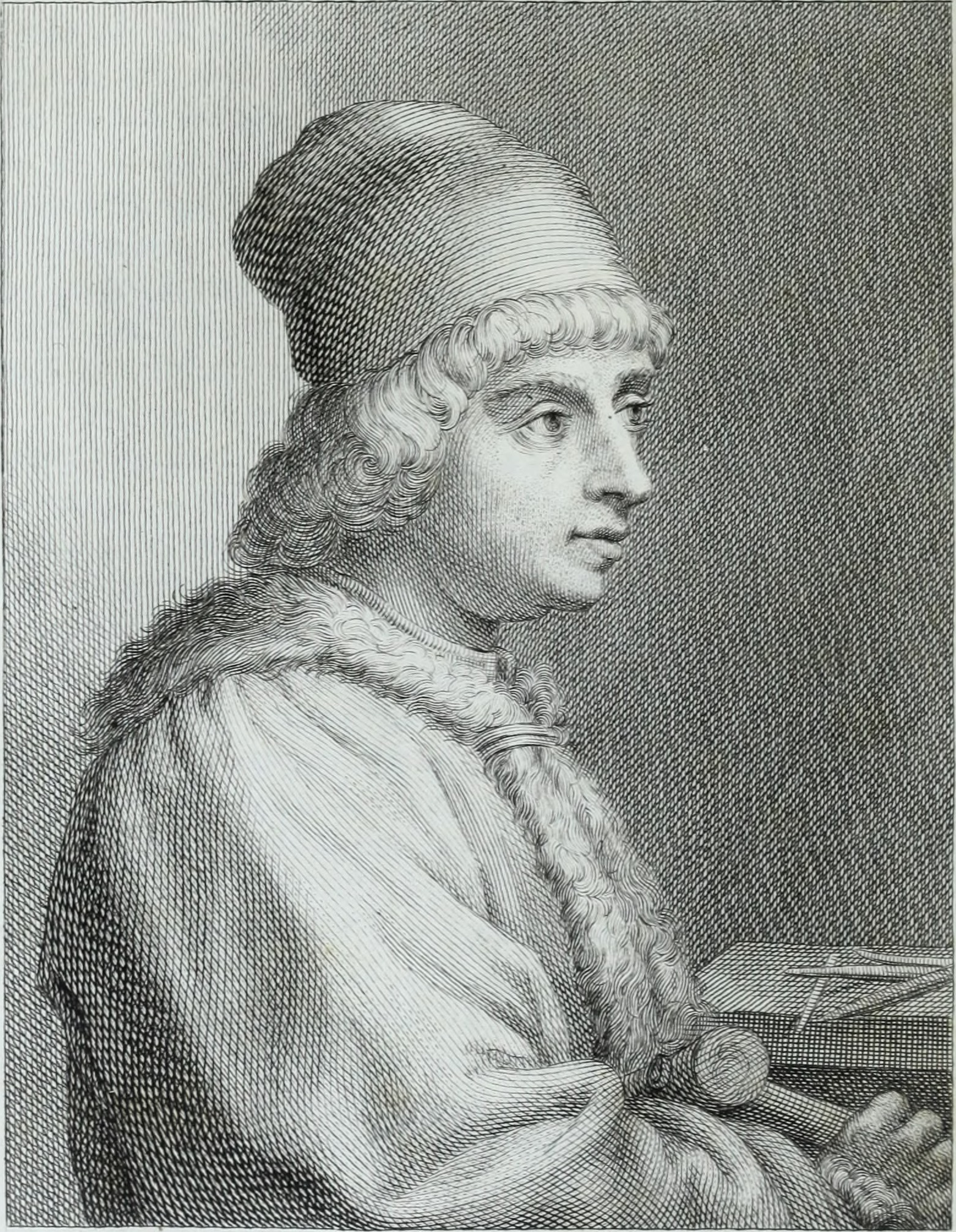
- Born: Jacopo di Pietro d'Agnolo di Guarnieri c. 1374; Quercegrossa near Siena, Republic of Siena
- Died: 20 October 1438 (aged 63–64); Siena, Republic of Siena
- Known for: Sculpture
- Notable work: The Tomb of Ilaria del Carretto
- Movement: Early Renaissance

Jacopo della Quercia (/ˌdɛlə ˈkwɛərtʃə/, Italian: [ˈjaːkopo della ˈkwɛrtʃa]; c. 1374 – 20 October 1438), also known as Jacopo di Pietro d'Agnolo di Guarnieri, was an Italian sculptor of the Early Renaissance, a contemporary of Brunelleschi, Ghiberti and Donatello.

== Biography ==
Jacopo della Quercia takes his name from Quercia Grossa (now Quercegrossa), a place near Siena, Tuscany, where he was born in 1374. He received his early training from his father, Piero d'Angelo, a woodcarver and goldsmith. In 1386 he and his father moved to Lucca, owing to party strife and disturbances.

Jacopo della Quercia, must have seen the Pulpit in the cathedral of Siena by Nicola Pisano and works of Arnolfo di Cambio that must have influenced him. It is also likely that della Quercia studied the huge collection of Roman sculptures and sarcophagi in the Camposanto in Pisa. These and later influences made him a transitional figure in the history of European art; his work shows a pronounced mid-career shift from the Gothic style to that of the Italian Renaissance. As in the case of Ghiberti, this development probably results from exposure to his contemporary, Donatello.

His first work may have been at the age of sixteen, a wooden equestrian statue for the funeral of Azzo Ubaldini. Other contested early works appear in the Lucca Cathedral, a Man of Sorrows on the Altar of the Sacrament, and a relief on the Tomb of St. Aniello. In 1401 he entered the competition to design the bronze doors for Florence's Baptistery, but lost to Ghiberti. The unsuccessful entry's whereabouts are unknown.

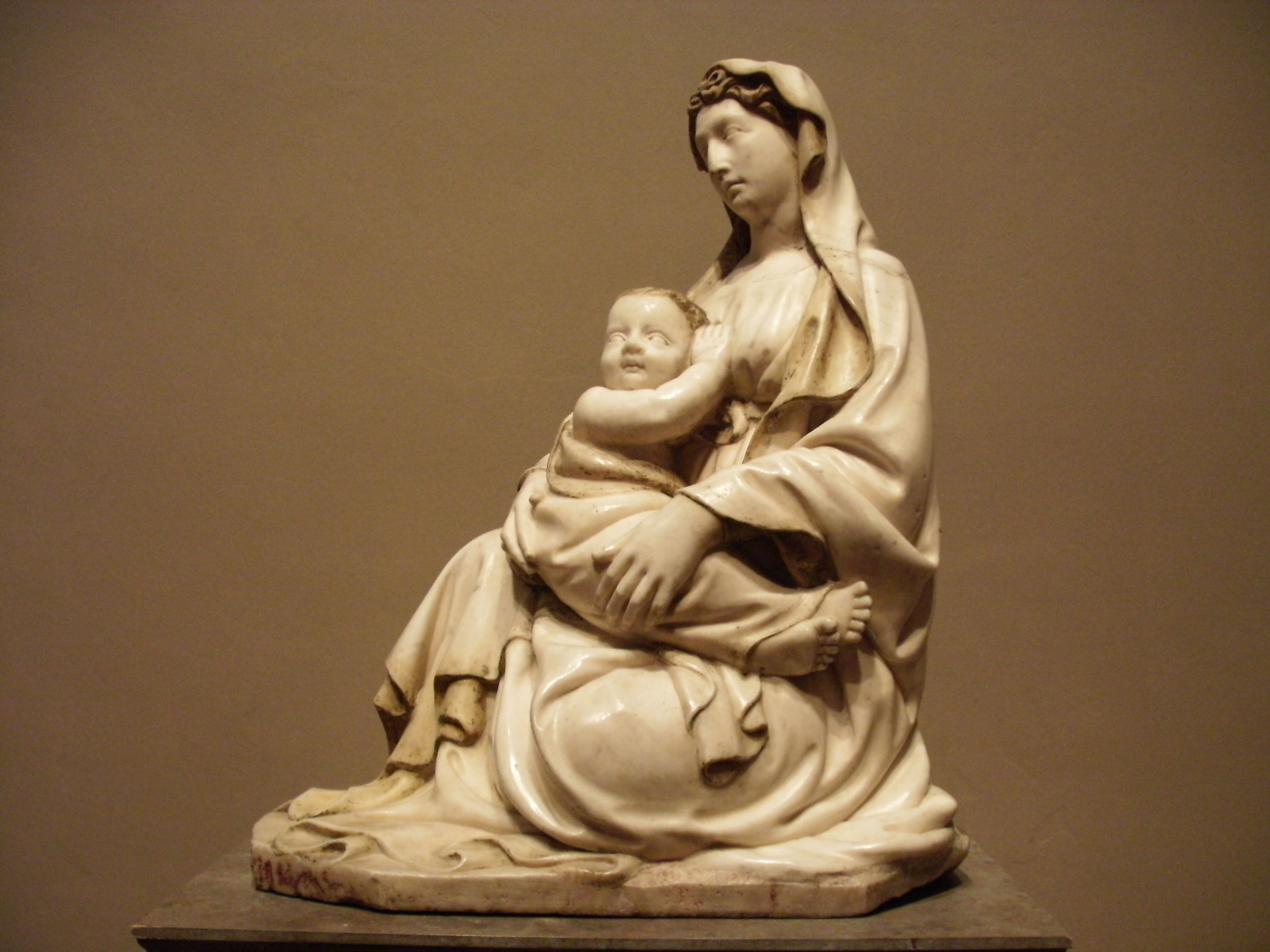
Madonna of Humility, marble, c. 1400, National Gallery of Art, Washington

In 1403 he sculpted the marble Virgin and Child for the Ferrara Cathedral. Another (possible) work from his period in Ferrara is the statuette of St. Maurelius (both on display in the Museo del Duomo).

Back again in Lucca in 1406, he received the commission from the city's ruler, Paolo Guinigi, to begin work at the tomb of his second wife Ilaria del Carretto in the Lucca cathedral. The richly dressed woman rests on top of the sarcophagus, delicately portrayed in a Gothic fashion, with her dog, a symbol of conjugate fidelity, at her feet. But his use of several nude putti at the flanks of the tomb clearly shows the classical influence of the Roman sarcophagi in the Camposanto of Pisa. This is a first, a harbinger of the incipient Renaissance.

== Fonte Gaia in Siena ==
Fonte Gaia in Siena

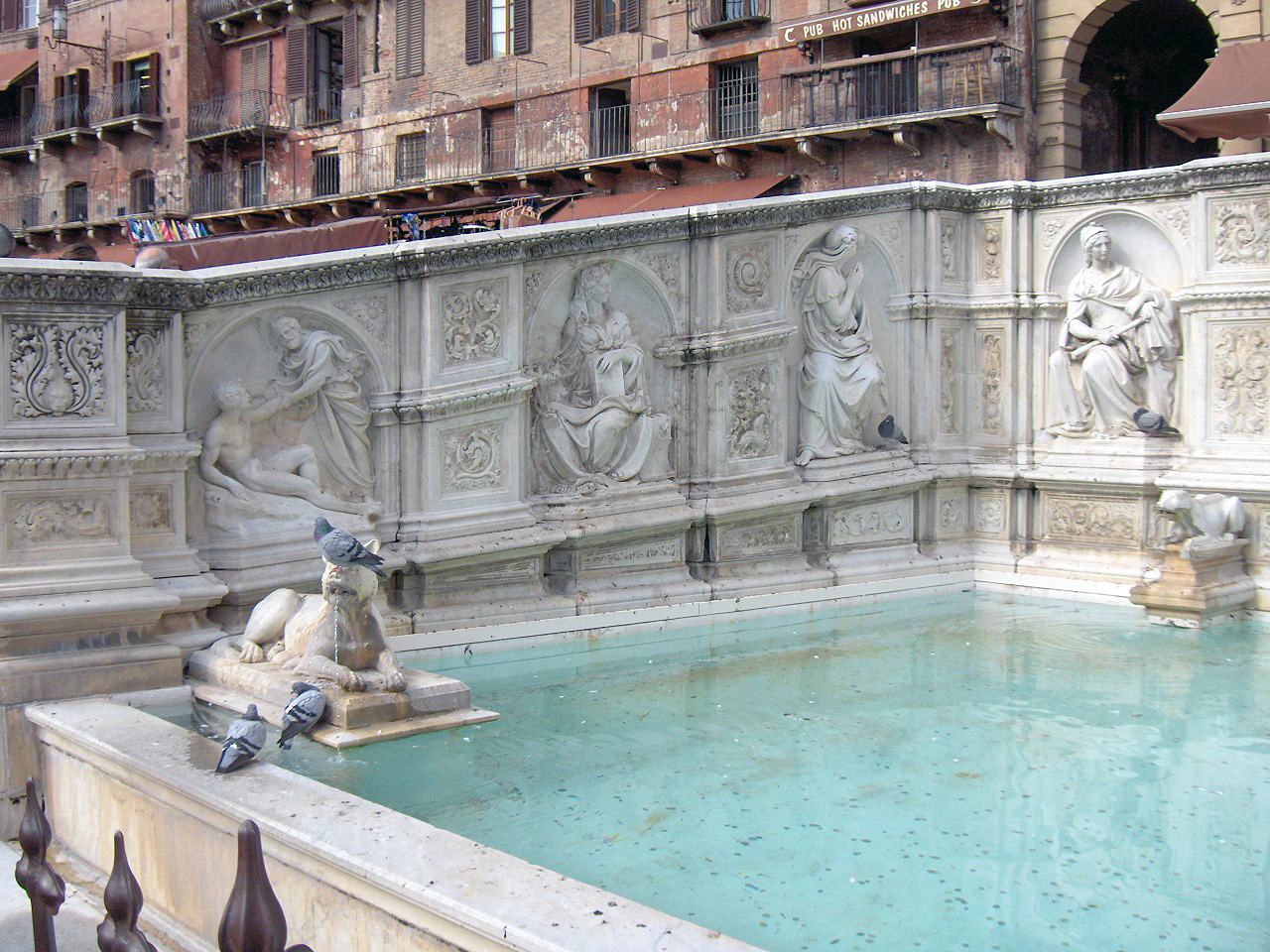
Left side with The Creation of Adam

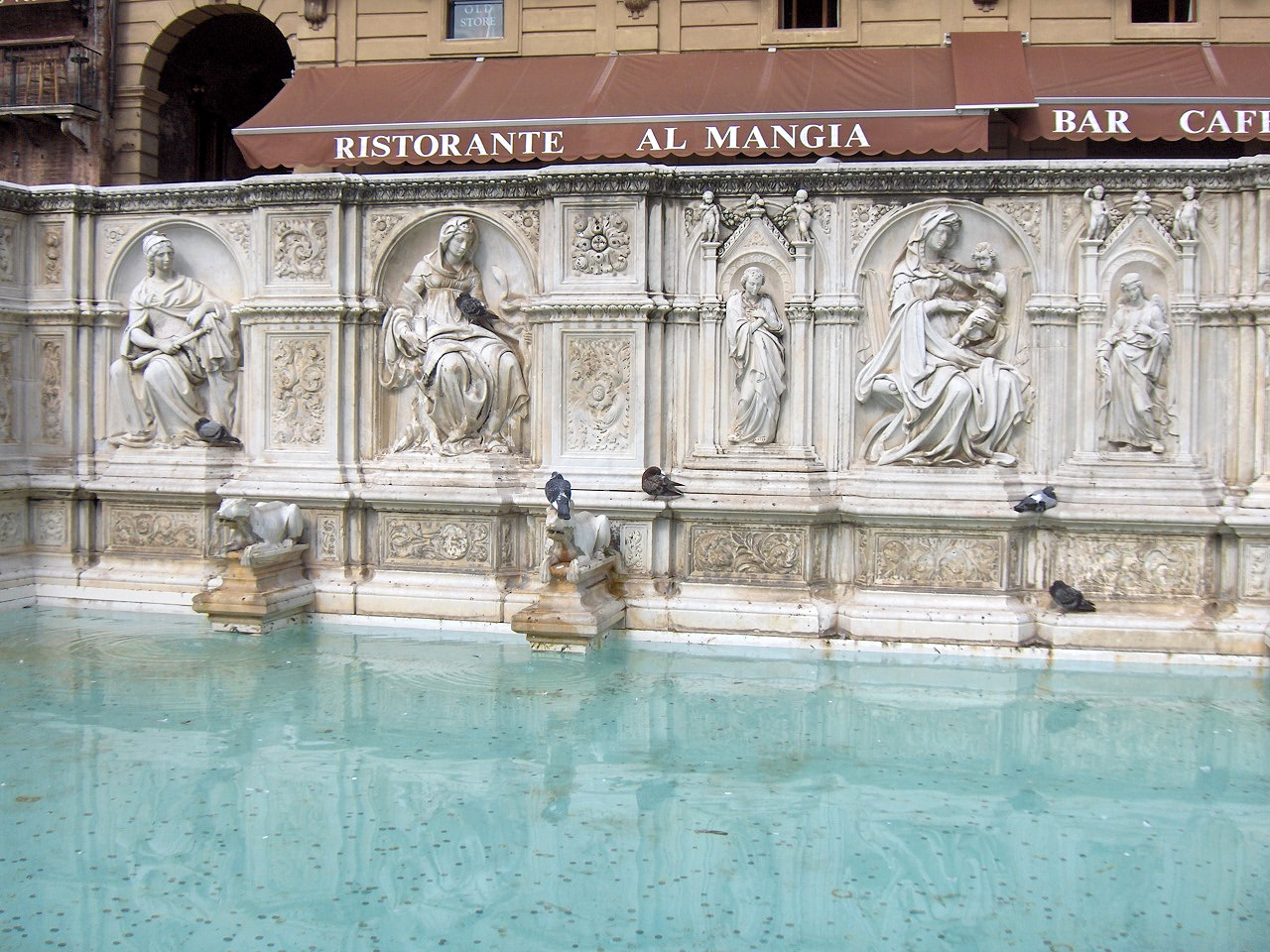
Middle section

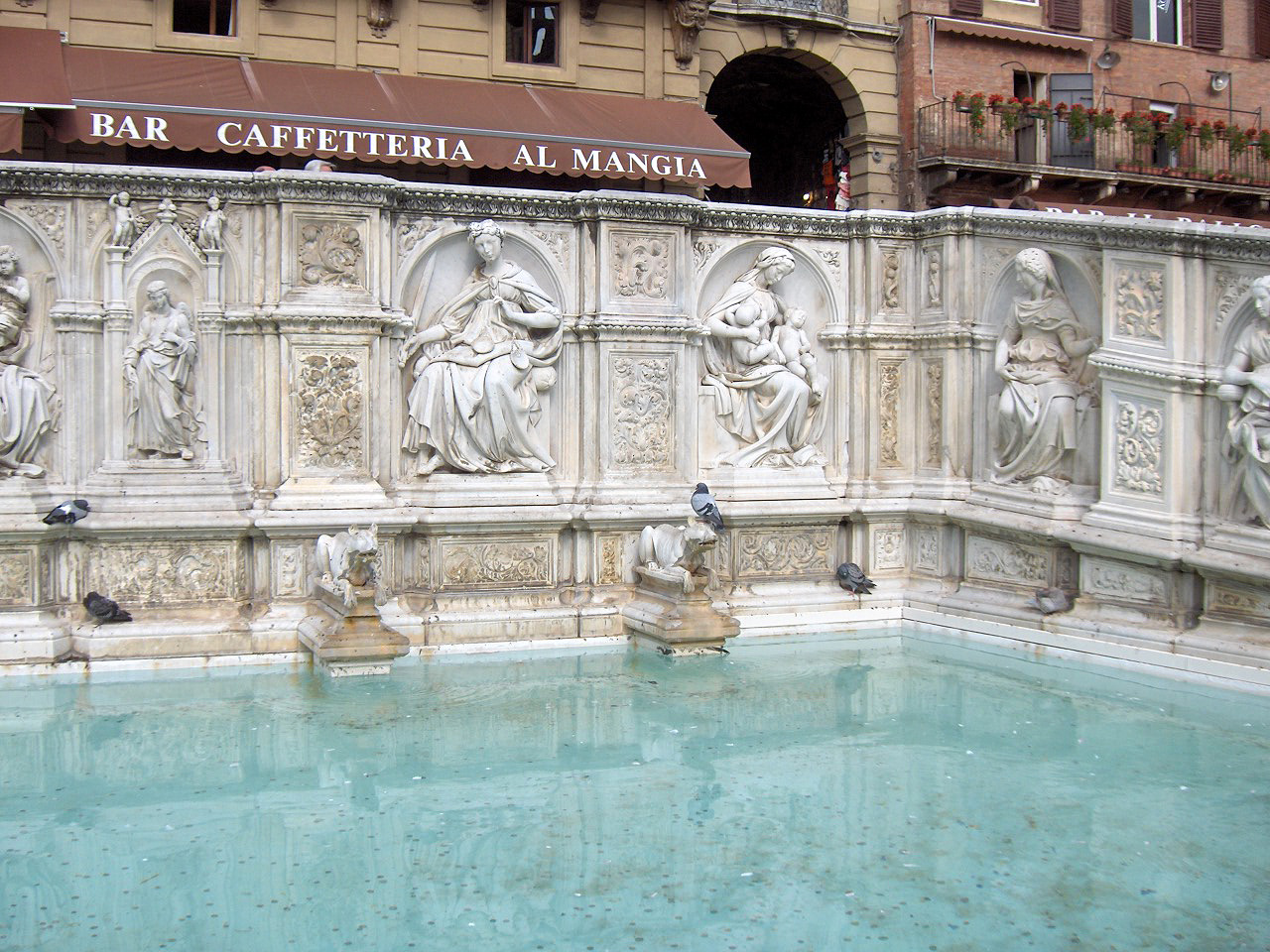
Right side

In 1406 he was asked to build a new fountain in the Piazza del Campo in Siena. It had to replace the original fountain with a statue of the goddess Venus. This pagan statue was blamed for an outbreak of the Black Plague. The statue was destroyed and buried outside the city walls to avert its "evil influence". This prestigious commission shows that he was already being recognized as Siena's most prominent sculptor. The rectangular fountain, built in white marble, was dedicated to the Virgin, adorned on the three sides by many statues and multiple spouts. Because he accepted also other commissions at the same time, progress was slow. He started in 1414 and the fountain was only finished in 1419. He carved the panels in the cathedral's workshop. The workshop today is converted into the Cathedral Museum. The fountain was called Fonte Gaia, because of the joy and the festivities when it was brought into operation. It is now a centre of attraction for many tourists. The old statues were replaced by copies in 1858 from Tito Sarrocchi and are on display in the lower levels at Santa Maria della Scala.

== Other works ==
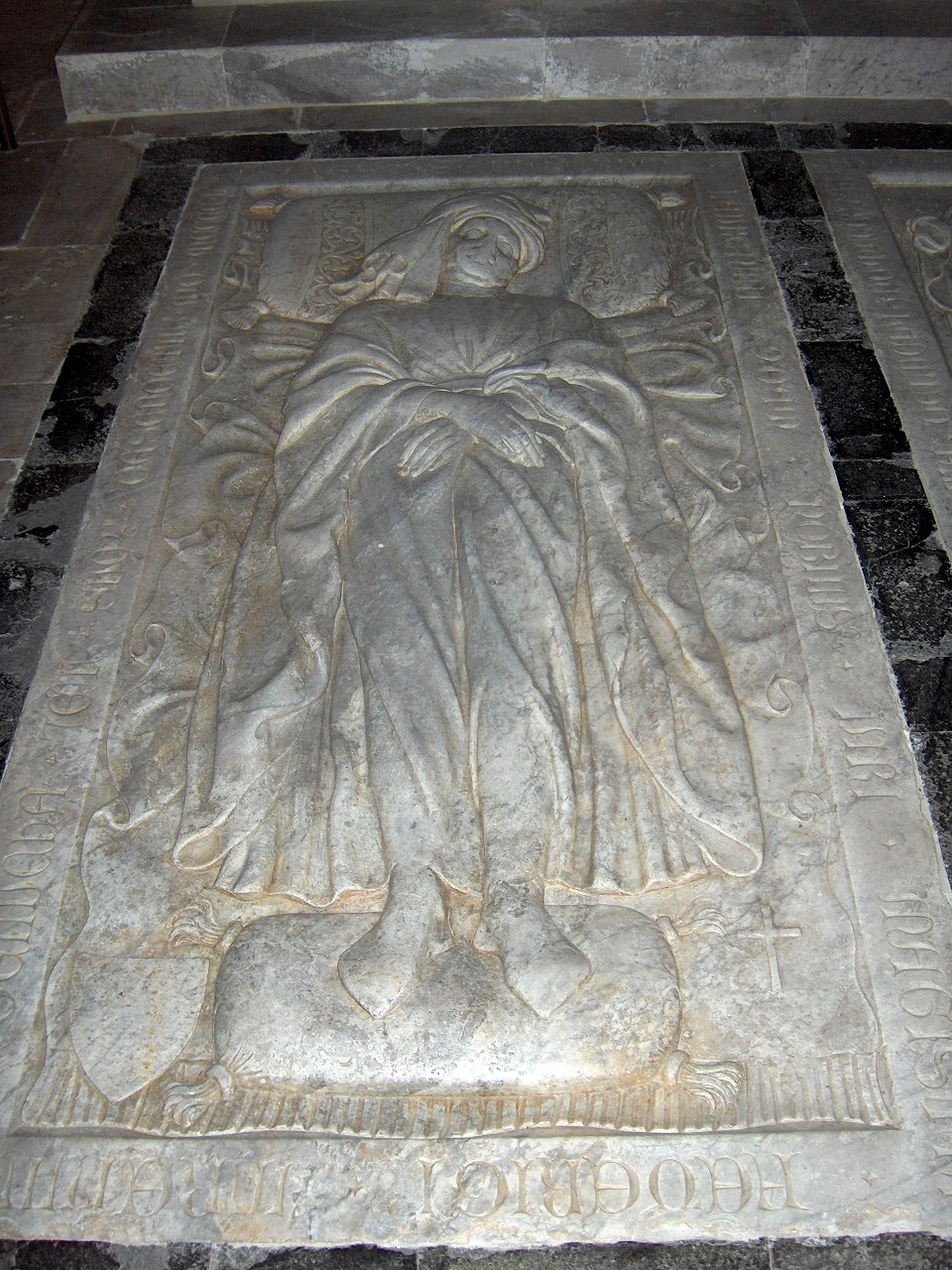
Tomb effigy of Lorenzo Trenta

In 1412, contracted by a wealthy merchant Lorenzo Trenta, he started the design of the Trenta Chapel in the Basilica di San Frediano in Lucca. In 1413 he was accused, together with his assistant Giovanni da Imola, of serious crimes: theft, as well as rape and sodomy of one Clara Sembrini. He fled to Siena (and began working on the Fonte Gaia), but his assistant was incarcerated for three years. Jacopo della Quercia only would return to Lucca in March 1416, given a letter of safe conduct. He continued at the Trenta Chapel on the marble altar and several statues of saints, contained in niches. Some work was also performed by his assistant. Jacopo also designed the tomb slabs of Lorenzo Trenta and his wife Isabetta Onesti, on the pavement in front of the altar.

When in 1416 Lorenzo Ghiberti was asked to design a hexagonal basin with bronze panels for the Baptistery in Siena, political infighting brought Jacopo della Quercia into the project (who had been his competitor for the bronze doors in Florence). He only completed one bronze relief The Annunciation to Zacharias because he was working at the same time on the Fonte Gaia and the Trenta Chapel. His lingering on this project brought him in legal difficulties with the authorities.

In 1421 he carved an Annunciation, in a different style, with two wooden polychromed statues Virgin and Gabriel for the Collegiata in San Gimignano (the polychrome finishing was done by other masters, such as Martino di Bartolomeo). The sophistication of this group, equal to the quality of his marble statues, shows that he was also versatile in woodcarving. This led some authors to ascribe other wooden statues to him, but most are attributable to his very active workshop.

In his later years, he became even more active. In 1427 he received the commission to design the upper part of the baptismal font for the Siena Baptistery. This hexagonal column, resting on a pillared base in the middle of the basin, contains five prophets situated in niches. The marble statue of St. John the Baptist, at the top of the dome above the tabernacle, is also attributed to Jacopo della Quercia.

== Porta Magna in Bologna ==
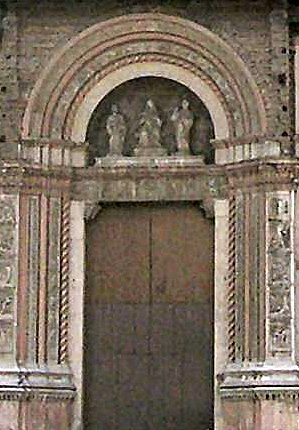
Porta Magna, S. Petronio, Bologna

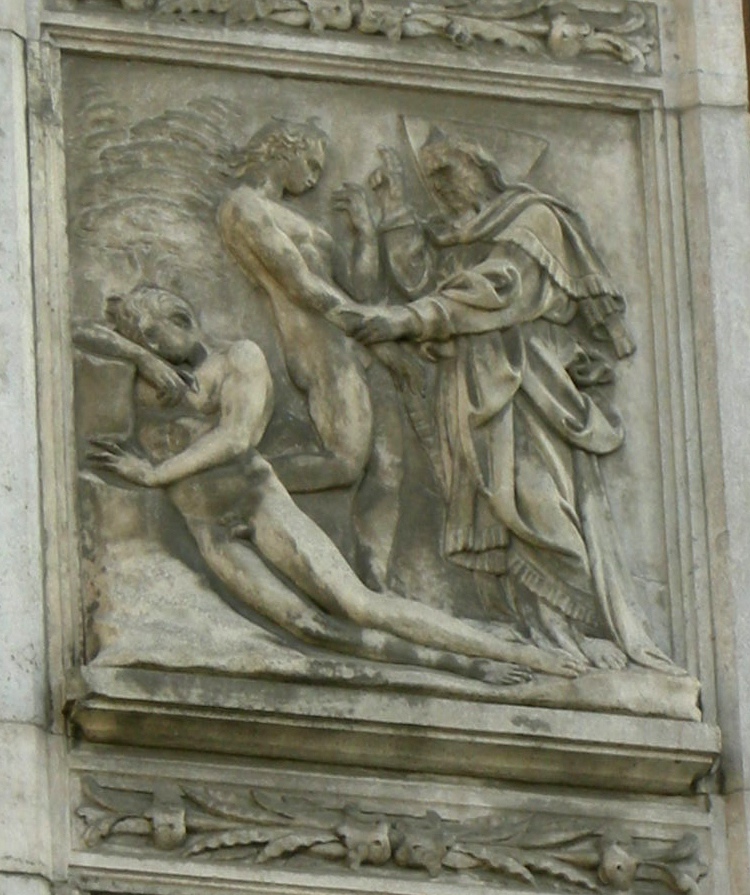
della Quercia's Creation of Eve, the source for Michelangelo's fresco on the Sistine Chapel Ceiling

In 1425 he accepted another major commission: the design of the round-arched Porta Magna of the San Petronio church in Bologna. It would keep him busy for a good deal of the last thirteen years of his life and it is considered his masterwork. Each side of the door is flanked, first by a colonette with a spirally wound decoration, then nine busts of prophets and at the end five scenes from the Old Testament, carved into somewhat lower relief. In the Creation of Adam, he uses the same arrangement as in the Fonte Gaia (in Siena), but in reverse order. Michelangelo, who had visited Bologna in 1494, conceded that his Genesis on the Sistine Chapel ceiling was based on these reliefs (birth of Eve shown at right). The architrave above the door contains five reliefs with representations from the New Testament. The lunette contains three free-standing statues: Virgin and Child, Saint Petronius (with a model of Bologna in his right hand) and Saint Ambrose (carved by another sculptor, Domenico Aimo, in 1510). Originally this third statue had to represent the papal legate Cardinal Alemmano, but this intention was quickly abandoned after the cardinal had been evicted from Bologna. He relied heavily on the artists of his Bolognese workshop, such as Cino di Bartolo, for assistance in this project.

While working at the Porta Magna, he was asked in 1434 by the Sienese to design the Loggia di San Paolo, close to the Piazza del Campo. He was not able to finish this commission. At his death, he had only finished the capitals and six niches.

In his final years, he was awarded several honours by the Sienese. In 1435 he was knighted and given the important position of operaio, the headmaster of the cathedral workshop.

In his final years, he was also involved in the decoration of the chapel of Saint Sebastian (destroyed in 1645) for the cardinal Casini in the cathedral of Siena, but, as part of a relief of the cardinal, most works were done by his Siena workshop. This carved high relief, Cardinal Antonio Casini presented to the Virgin by St. Anthony of Egypt, is on display in the Hall of Statues in the Cathedral Museum.

Jacopo della Quercia died at Siena on 20 October 1438. He was buried in the San Agostino church in Siena.

He was already held in high esteem by his contemporaries, such as Lorenzo Ghiberti, Antonio Filarete and Giovanni Santi. Giorgio Vasari included a biography of Jacopo della Quercia in his Lives of the Artists (1550).

== Main works ==
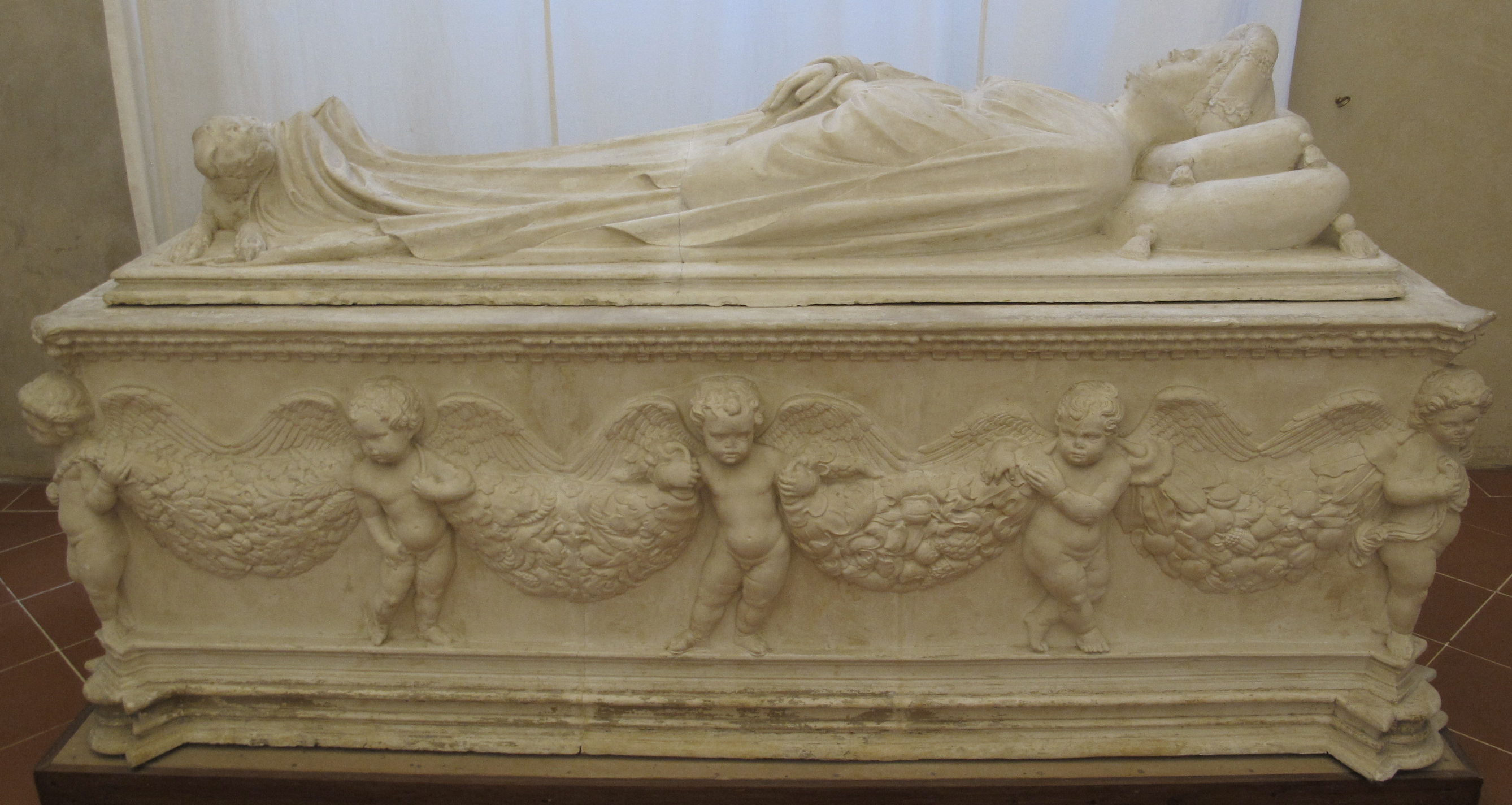
The tomb of Ilaria del Carretto (c. 1406), Cathedral of Lucca

- An equestrian wooden statue for the funeral of Azzo Ubaldini (1400 ?)
- Knight of San Cassiano (Il Cavaliere di San Cassiano) (1400?) - Wood, height 185 cm Church di San Cassiano, San Cassiano
- (? ) Madonna on top of the Piccolomini Altarpiece in the Siena Cathedral (1397–1400)
- Virgin and Child (Silvestri Madonna) (1403) - Marble, height 210 cm, Cathedral of Ferrara
- St. Maurelius (c. 1403) - Cathedral of Ferrara.
- Tomb of Ilaria del Carretto (c. 1406) - Cathedral of Lucca
- Fonte Gaia (1408–1419) - Siena
- Virtue (1409–19) - Marble, height 135 cm, Palazzo Pubblico, Siena
- Hope (1409–19) - Marble, Palazzo Pubblico, Siena
- Acca Laurentia (1414–19) - Marble, height 162 cm, Palazzo Pubblico, Siena
- Rhea Sylvia (1414–19) - Marble, height 160 cm, Palazzo Pubblico, Siena
- Annunciation, Virgin and Gabriel - Collegiata di San Gimignano
- polyptych on the Trenta family altar (1422) - Basilica di San Frediano, Lucca
- Porta Magna (1425) - Basilica di San Petronio, Bologna
- Panel and statuette of John the Baptist on baptismal font (1427) - Baptistry of Siena's cathedral.
