= Oak, West Virginia =

Oak
- Unincorporated community
- Location within the state of West Virginia Oak (the United States)
- Coordinates: 39°7′55″N 81°41′47″W
- Country: United States
- State: West Virginia
- County: Wood
- Elevation: 640 ft (200 m)
- Time zone: UTC-5 (Eastern (EST))
  - Summer (DST): UTC-4 (EDT)
- GNIS ID: 1560459

Oak was an unincorporated community in Wood County, West Virginia, United States.
