= Lucca Cathedral =

Cathedral of Lucca, Tuscany, Italy

Cathedral of Saint Martin Cattedrale di San Martino
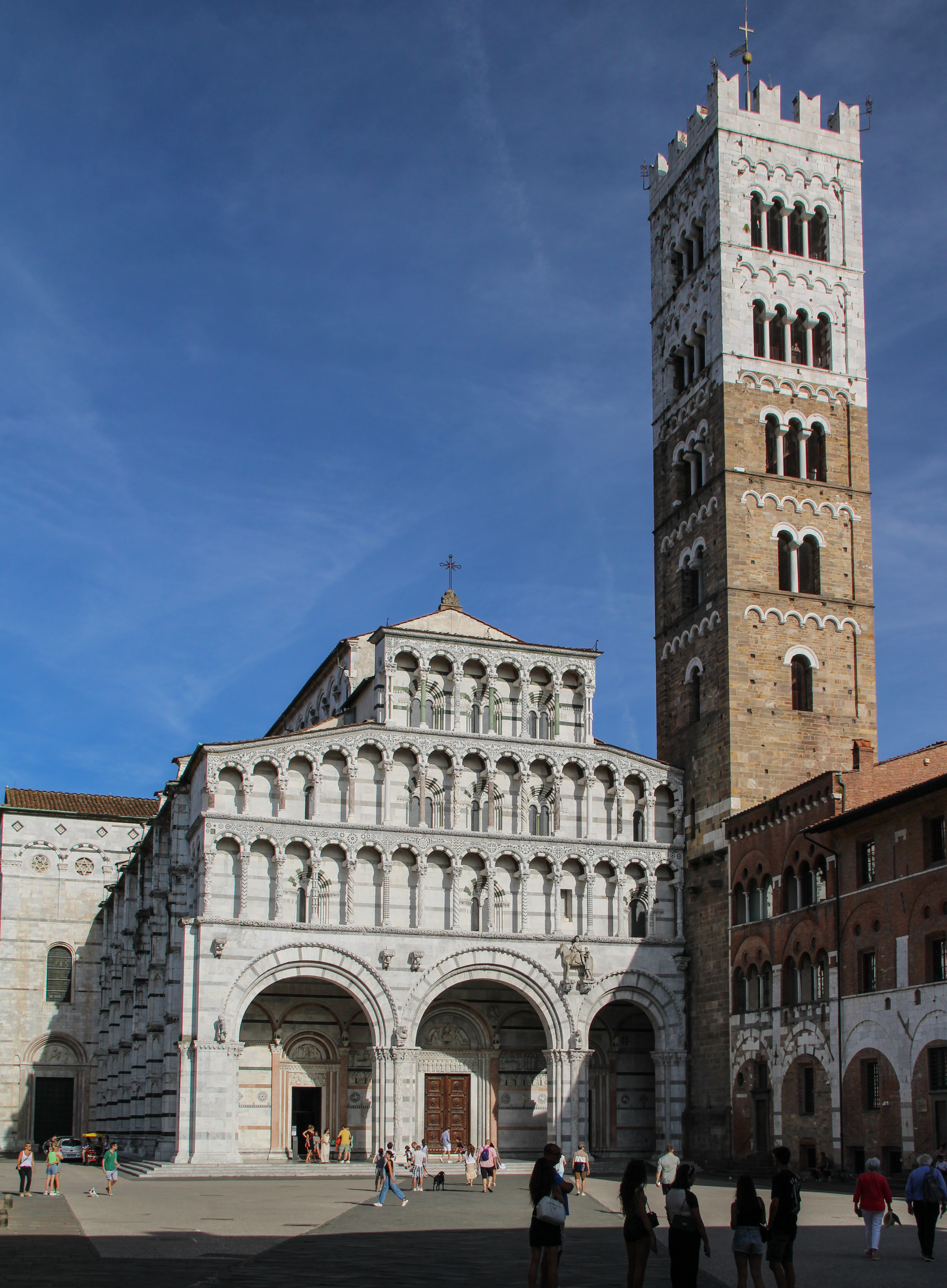
- Façade and bell tower of Lucca Cathedral

- Location within Italy

Religion
- Affiliation: Roman Catholic
- Diocese: Archdiocese of Lucca
- Rite: Roman
- Ecclesiastical or organizational status: Cathedral

Location
- Location: Lucca, Italy
- Interactive map of Cathedral of Saint Martin; Cattedrale di San Martino
- Coordinates: 43°50′26.5″N 10°30′21″E

Architecture
- Type: Church
- Style: Gothic, Romanesque

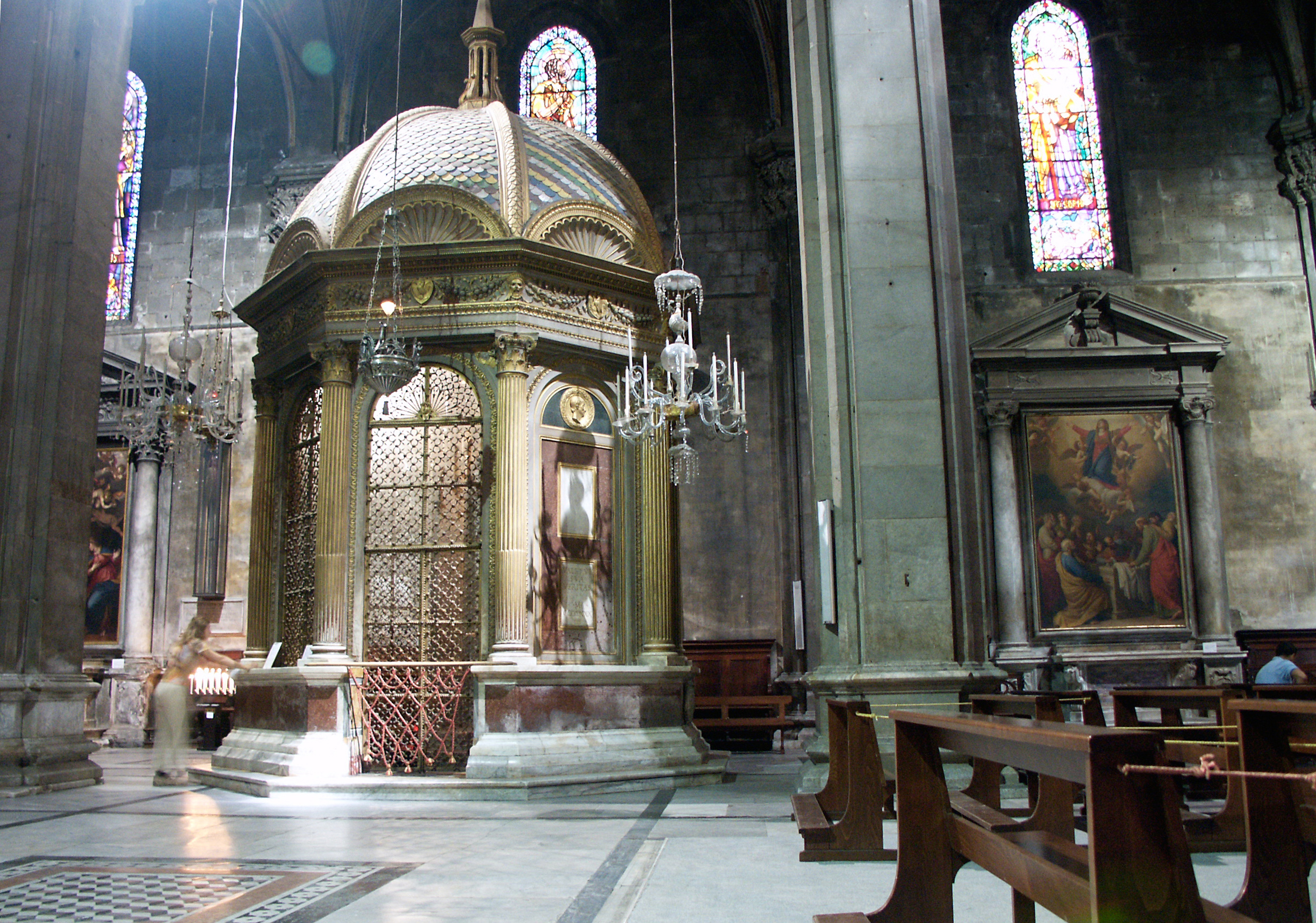
Shrine of the Sacred Face of Lucca

Lucca Cathedral (Italian: Duomo di Lucca, Cattedrale di San Martino) is a Roman Catholic cathedral dedicated to Saint Martin of Tours in Lucca, Italy. It is the seat of the Archbishop of Lucca.

== History ==
=== Old Cathedral ===
A church was built on the site in the 6th century and at the beginning of the 8th century, the seat of the bishop was transferred from the church of San Reparto to the current site.

The most precious relic in Lucca, the Holy Face of Lucca according to legend carved by a contemporary of Jesus and through a series of miraculous events arrived in the church in 782.

=== Construction of the current Cathedral ===
Construction of the current cathedral was begun in 1060 by Bishop Anselm (who would later become Pope Alexander II). It was consecrated by Pope Alexander in 1070.

A west west front was begun in 1204 by Guido Bigarelli of Como. The nave and transepts were rebuilt in the Gothic style in the 14th century.

=== Cathedral Chapter ===
The cathedral was run by a cathedral chapter, composed of four dignities (Archpriest, Archdeacon, Primicerius, and Abbot) and fourteen canons, two of whom served as the Theologus (preacher) and Penitentiary. They enjoyed the privilege of using the mitre and a gold pectoral cross. The chapter at times chose the bishop, as for example in 1225 when they chose a cathedral canon, Riccardus, by lot. The election was confirmed by Pope Honorius III despite his displeasure at the use of the lot.

From 1077 another bishop, the younger Anselm of Lucca attempted to impose the Rule of Saint Augustine upon the chapter which they mostly refused despite a Papal interdict. This ended when Anselm was expelled from Lucca around 1080.

== Description ==
Of the original structure, the great apse with its tall columnar arcades and the fine campanile remain. The nave and transepts are 14th century Gothic, while the west front consists of a vast portico of three magnificent arches, and above them three ranges of open galleries adorned with sculptures.

In the nave a small octagonal chapel shrine contains the Holy Face of Lucca. The chapel was built in 1484 by Matteo Civitali, the most famous Luccese sculptor of the early Renaissance.

Additionally the cathedral contains Domenico Ghirlandaio's Madonna and Child with Saints Peter, Clement, Paul and Sebastian; Federico Zuccari's Adoration of the Magi, Jacopo Tintoretto's Last Supper, and finally Fra Bartolomeo's Madonna and Child (1509).

There is a legend to explain why all the columns of the façade are different. According to the tale, when they were going to decorate it, the inhabitants of Lucca announced a contest for the best column. Every artist made a column, but then the inhabitants of Lucca decided to take them all, without paying the artists and used all the columns.

=== Labyrinth ===
The labyrinth is embedded in the right pier of the portico and is believed to date from the 12th or 13th century. Its importance is that it may well pre-date the famous Chartres labyrinth, yet is of the Chartres pattern that became a standard for labyrinths. The rustic incised Latin inscription refers to ancient pagan mythology: "This is the labyrinth built by Dedalus of Crete; all who entered therein were lost, save Theseus, thanks to Ariadne's thread" (HIC QUEM CRETICUS EDIT. DAEDALUS EST LABERINTHUS . DE QUO NULLUS VADERE . QUIVIT QUI FUIT INTUS . NI THESEUS GRATIS ADRIANE . STAMINE JUTUS").

== Burials ==
- Adalbert II of Tuscany
- Bertha, daughter of Lothair II
- Ilaria del Carretto

== Gallery ==
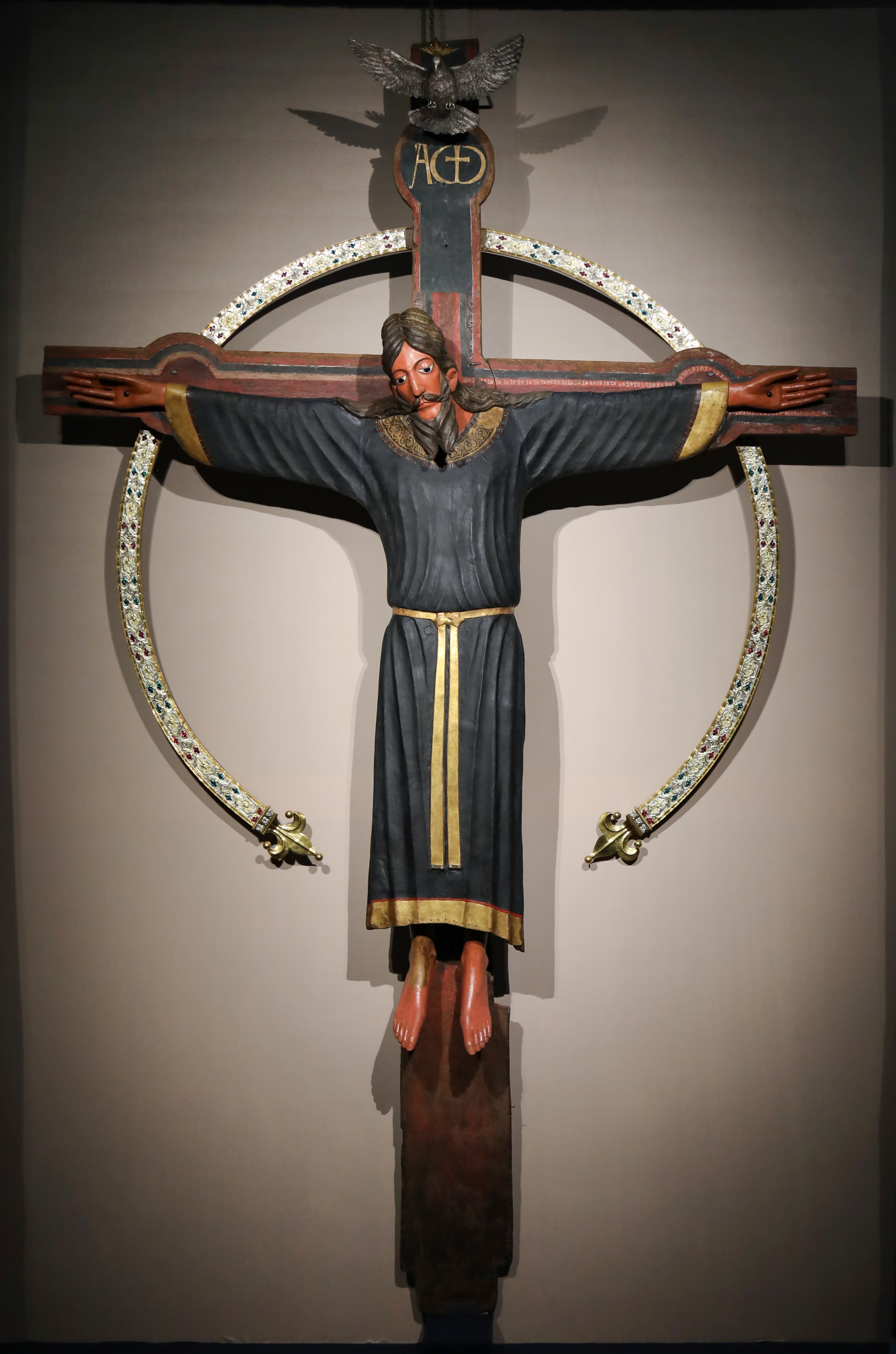
The Volto Santo (ca. 780–820), after its restoration in 2025

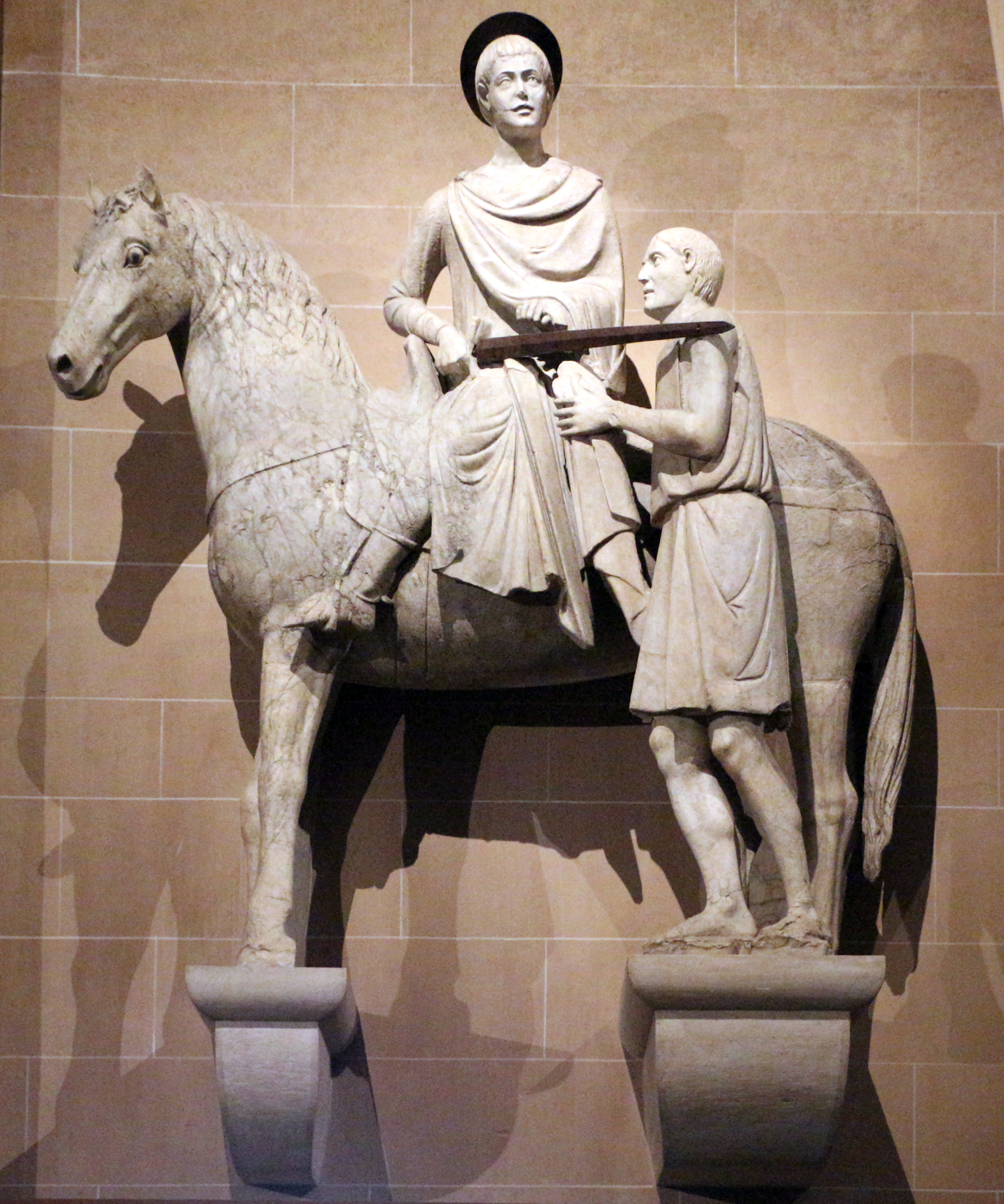
Saint Martin and the beggar, ca 1200

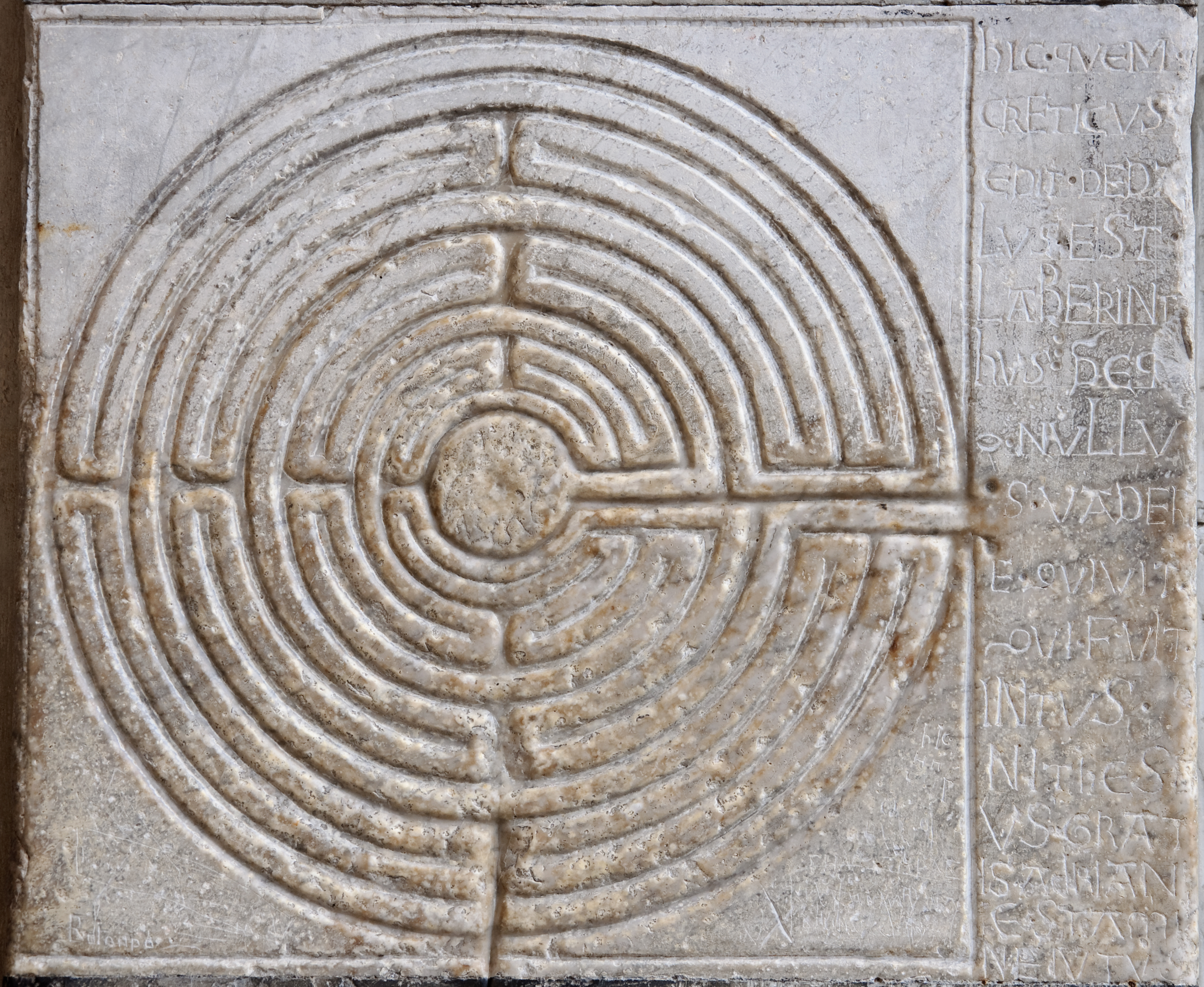
Labyrinth on the portico of the cathedral

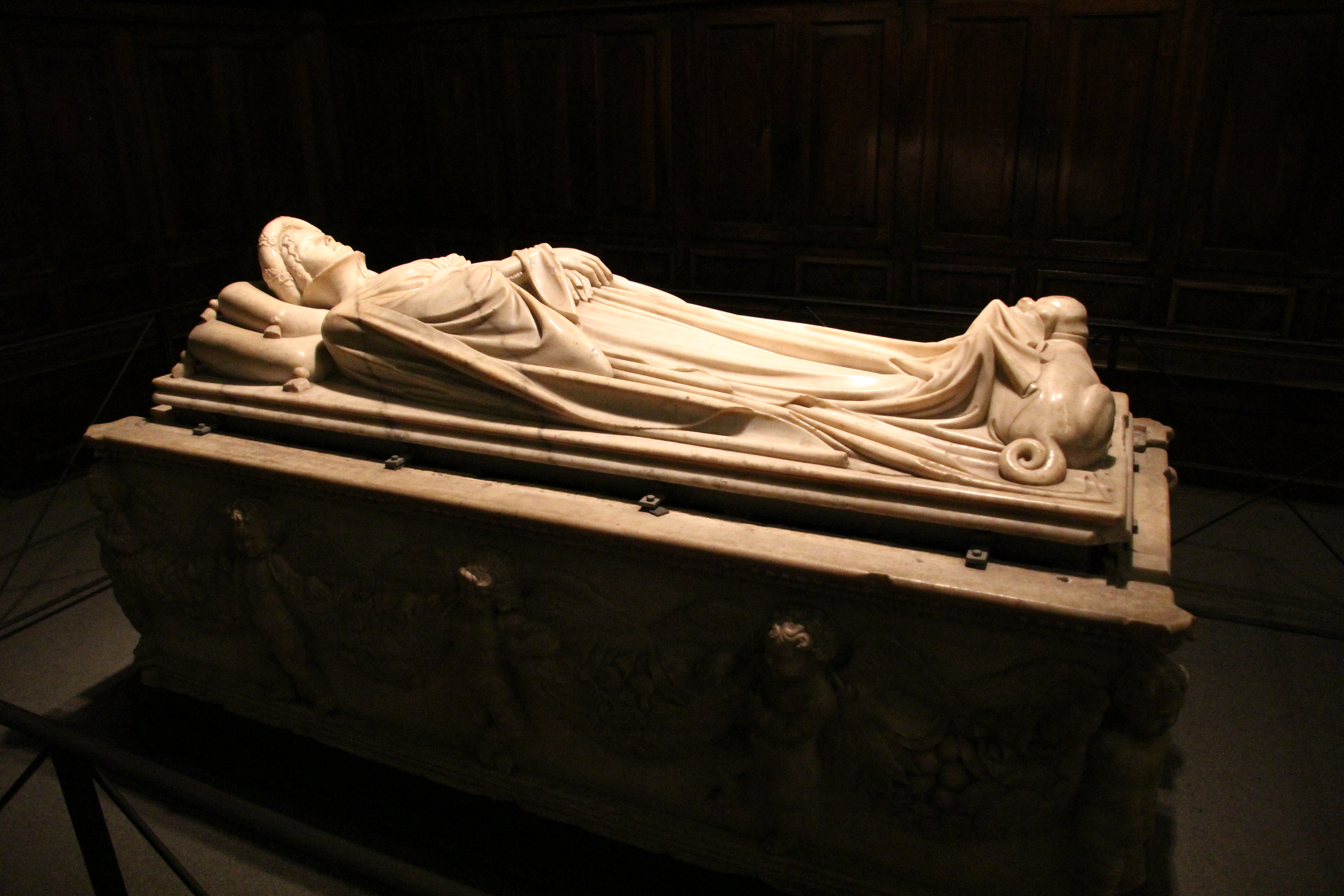
Jacopo della Quercia, Funerary monument of Ilaria del Carretto, 1413

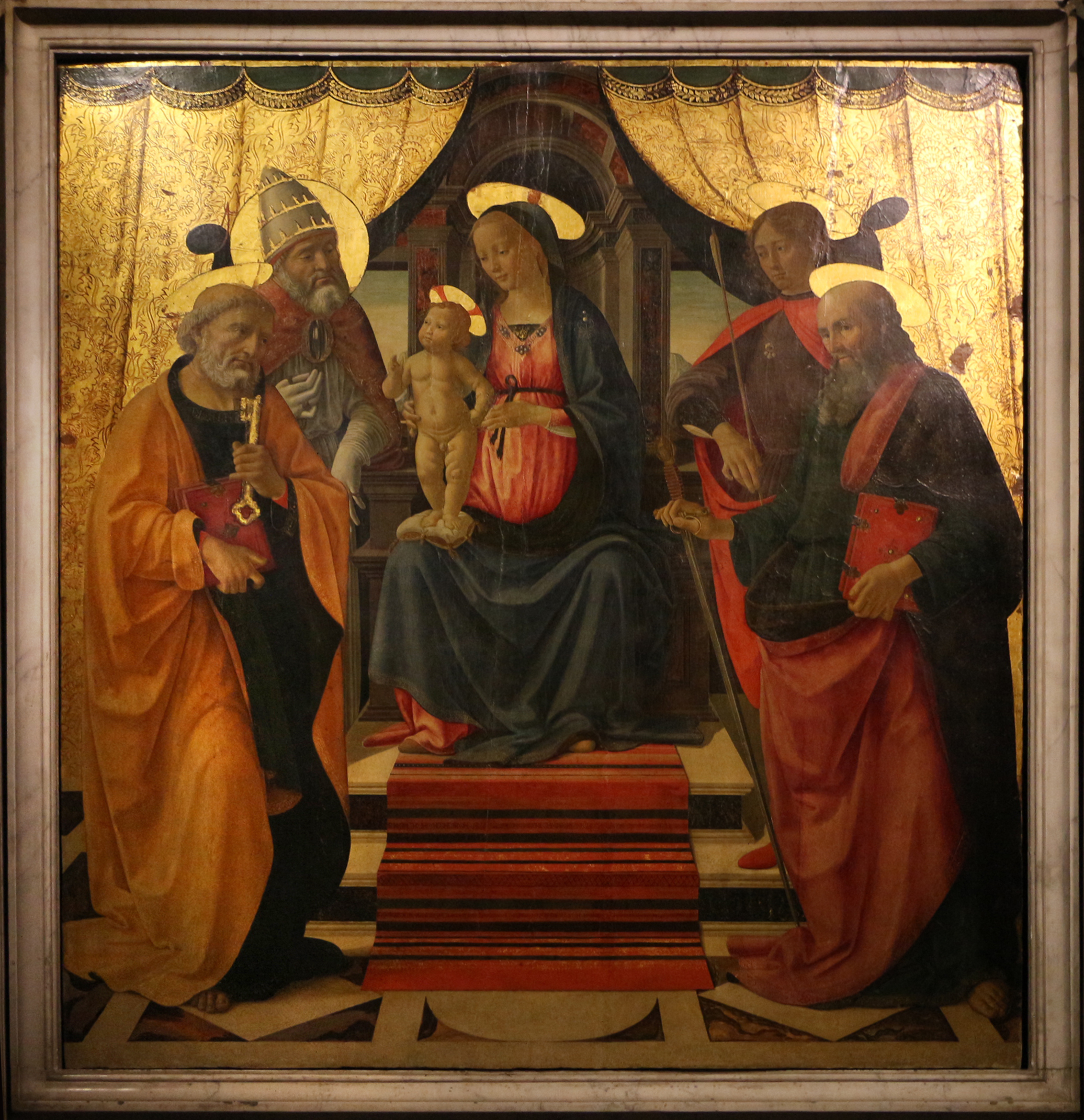
Domenico Ghirlandaio, Sacra Conversazione, 1479

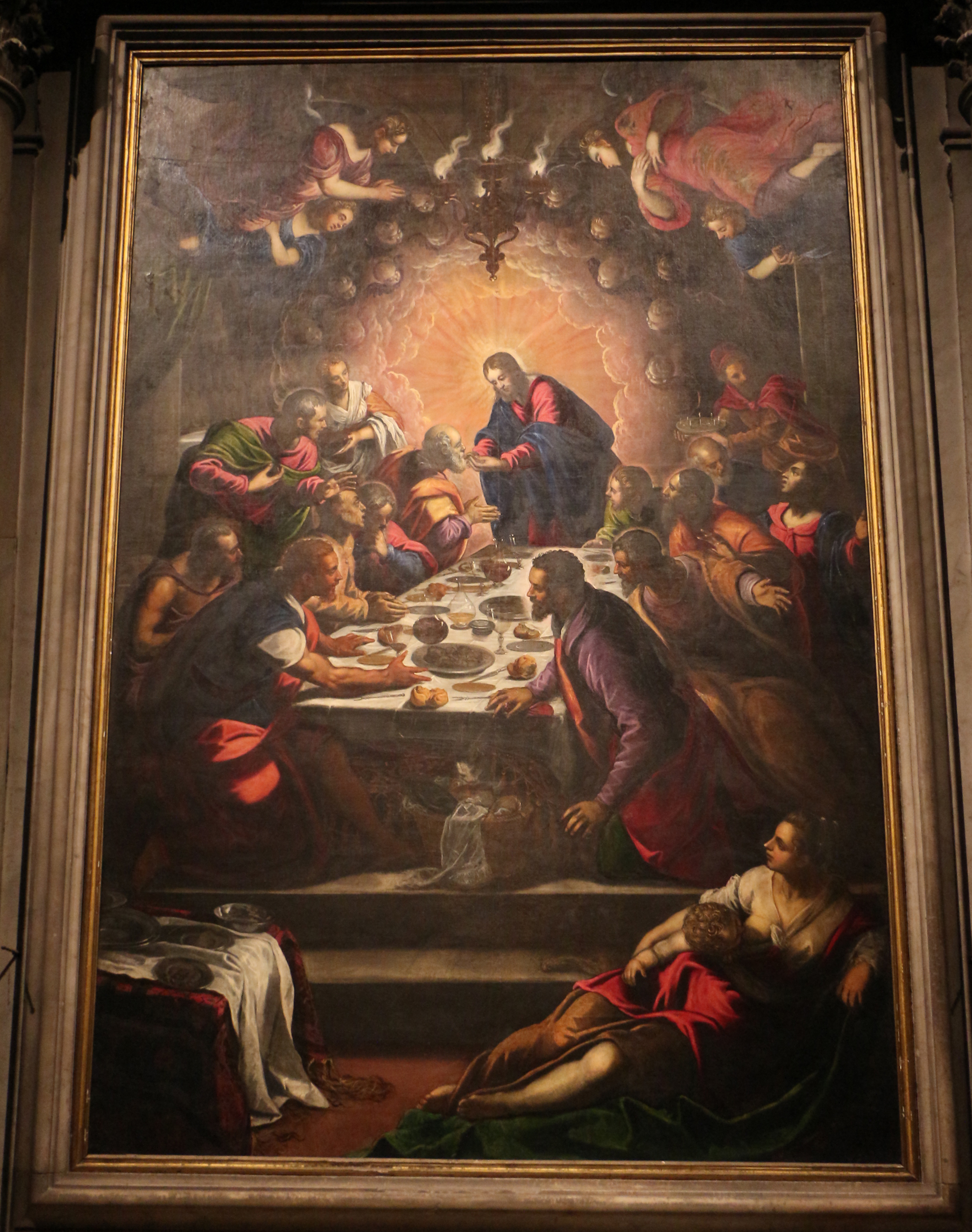
Jacopo Tintoretto, The Last Supper, 1592–94

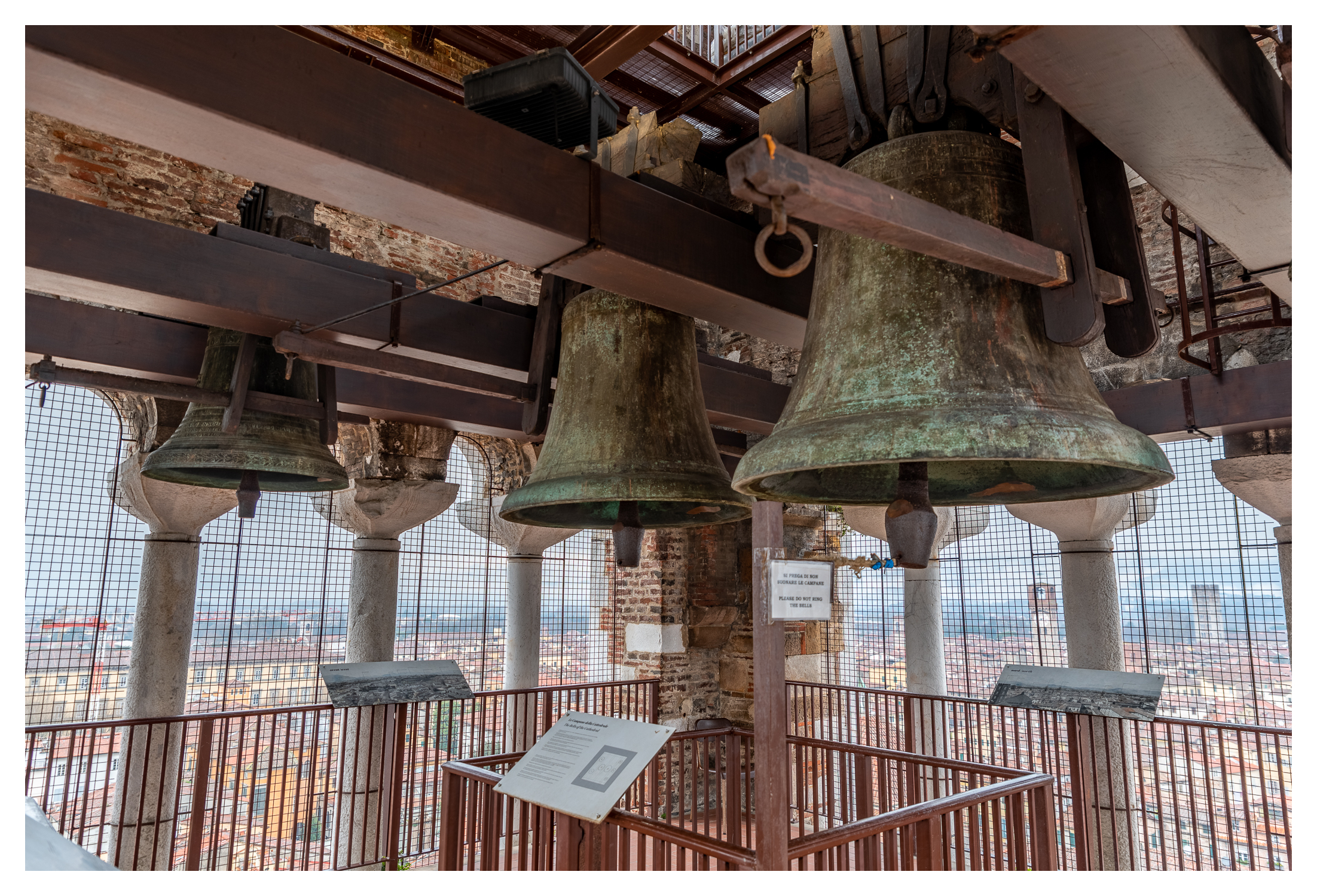
Bells in the campanile

Sound of the bell at the top of the campanile at twelve o'clock

== See also ==
- Cathedral architecture

== Bibliography ==
- Kehr, Paul Fridolin (1908). Italia pontificia (in Latin). Vol. 3 (Tomus Tertius: Etruria). Berlin: Weidmann. pp. 386–453.
