= Fred Oakes =

English footballer

Personal information
- Full name: Frederick Oakes
- Date of birth: 1880
- Place of birth: West Hartlepool, England
- Position: Winger

Senior career*
Years	Team	Apps	(Gls)
1902–1903	New Clee Alexandra		
1903–1904	Grimsby St John's		
1904–1905	Grimsby Town	1	(0)
1905–1906	Grimsby St John's		
1906–190?	Grimsby Rovers		
- * Club domestic league appearances and goals

Frederick Oakes (1880 – after 1905) was an English professional footballer who played as a winger.
