= Alf Oakes =

English footballer (1901–1967)

Personal information
- Full name: Alfred William Oakes
- Date of birth: 22 July 1901
- Place of birth: Wribbenhall, England
- Date of death: 25 December 1967 (aged 66)
- Place of death: Bristol, England
- Height: 5 ft 11 in (1.80 m)
- Position: Inside left

Senior career*
Years	Team	Apps	(Gls)
1922–1923	Chesham United		
1923–1925	Millwall	6	(2)
1925–1926	Reading	0	(0)
1926	Rhyl Athletic		
1926–1927	Worcester City		(6)
1927–1928	Birmingham	1	(0)
1928–1929	Rhyl Athletic		
1929–1931	New Brighton	54	(15)
1931	Wigan Borough (Note: Wigan Borough folded during the 1931–32 season following the match on 24 October 1931, a 5–0 defeat at Wrexham in which Oakes played. Although the team's results from that season were expunged, Joyce includes the players' appearances in his totals.)	11	(4)
1931–1932	Frickley Colliery		
1932	Barnsley	0	(0)
1932–1933	Stalybridge Celtic		
1933–193?	Buxton		
- * Club domestic league appearances and goals

Alfred William Oakes (22 July 1901 – 25 December 1967) was an English professional footballer who made 72 appearances in the Football League playing for Millwall, Birmingham, New Brighton and Wigan Borough. He played as an inside left.

== Life and career ==
Oakes was born in Wribbenhall, Bewdley, Worcestershire. At 16, he joined what became the Royal Air Force. He played football for RAF Uxbridge, and while still a serving corporal, helped Chesham United win back-to-back Spartan League titles. He scored both goals in the Berks & Bucks Senior Cup final replay in 1922, and the following season scored 25 goals from 26 Spartan League matches and a further 14 goals in cup competitions.

In June 1923, Oakes turned professional with Third Division South club Millwall. He made his Football League debut on 8 September 1923 in a 1–1 draw away to Aberdare Athletic, and scored his first goal at that level in a 2–0 win in the reverse fixture the following week. He made four more league appearances, and scored his second goal in October 1924 against Reading, who signed him at the end of that season. He never appeared for their league side, and trials with Rhyl Athletic and Wellington Town preceded a few months at Worcester City, where he played alongside former Birmingham forward Moses Lane. In February 1927, Birmingham paid a fee of £300 for Oakes' services, but he played only once for their first team, shortly after joining the club, as deputy for Joe Bradford. At the end of the 1927–28 season Oakes returned to Rhyl Athletic. A year later he made a more successful return to the Football League, scoring 15 goals from 54 games for New Brighton in the Third Division North.

Oakes began the 1927–28 season with another Northern Section club, Wigan Borough. After twelve matches, the club folded and its results were expunged from official records. Oakes had played in all but one of those twelve, including the club's last ever Football League match, a 5–0 defeat at Wrexham on 24 October 1931, and scored four goals. He finished the season in the Midland League as Frickley Colliery's "trickiest forward" and scorer of 20 goals. In July 1932 he signed for Barnsley, newly relegated to the Third Division North, but was released a few weeks later to take up an offer of a player-groundsman role with Cheshire County League club Stalybridge Celtic. His last known club was Buxton.

The 1939 Register finds Oakes working as an aero engine fitter and living in Peache Road, Mangotsfield, Gloucestershire, with his wife, Gwyneth, and two school-age sons. The younger of the two, Donald, also became a footballer, and played professionally for Arsenal. Oakes was still resident at the same address at the time of his death, on Christmas Day 1967, which was registered in nearby Bristol.

== Sources ==
- Joyce, Michael (2004). Football League Players' Records 1888 to 1939. Nottingham: SoccerData (Tony Brown). p. 198. ISBN 978-1-899468-67-6.
- Matthews, Tony (1995). Birmingham City: A Complete Record. Derby: Breedon Books. ISBN 978-1-85983-010-9.
