= Oak Creek =

Oak Creek may refer to:

== Streams ==
Alphabetical by state

- Oak Creek (Arizona), and its gorge Oak Creek Canyon
- Oak Creek (Owens River tributary), Inyo County, California
- Oak Creek (Huerfano County, Colorado), a tributary of the Huerfano River
- Oak Creek (Eagle Creek tributary), Holt County, Nebraska
- Oak Creek (Niobrara River tributary), Rock County, Nebraska
- Oak Creek (New York), Schenevus Creek tributary, East Worcester
- Oak Creek (Marys River tributary), Oregon
- Oak Creek (White River tributary), South Dakota

== Settlements ==
- Oak Creek, Arizona
- Oak Creek, Colorado
- Oak Creek, Utah, in Sanpete County
- Oak Creek, Wisconsin
- Oak Creek Township, Bottineau County, North Dakota
- Oak Creek Township, Butler County, Nebraska
- Oak Creek Township, Saunders County, Nebraska
- Village of Oak Creek, Arizona

== Other uses ==
- Oak Creek High School, Wisconsin
- Oak Creek Nature Reserve, in New South Wales, Australia
