= The Oaks (band) =

- The Oaks 2007.

Background information
- Origin: Orlando, Florida
- Genre: Indie rock
- Years active: 2006–2009
- Label: unsigned

The Oaks (sometimes stylised as "The OaKs") are an American rock band based out of Orlando, Florida, created by singer-songwriter/guitarist Ryan Costello and drummer/percussionist Matthew Antolick. The band's sound contains elements of indie rock with classic rock, soul music, jazz, folk music and modern rock.

The Oaks have gained international attention through their original fusion of music performance and humanitarian aid. Costello spent two years in Afghanistan, living among recently returned refugees, teaching agricultural techniques and directly participating in food distributions. When he returned to the United States, he vowed to get the word out about the need of the Afghan people. The Oaks is the result of these aspirations.

== Biography ==
Costello and Antolick met as students at the University of South Florida. They played together in the project "Figure vs Ground" before relocating to suburban Orlando and creating The Oaks. Costello was pursuing a BA in Biology, while Antolick was working on his Master's in Philosophy and teaching Environmental Ethics.

In 2003, The OaKs' Ryan Costello sold everything he owned, joined a humanitarian organization and moved to Afghanistan. Costello lived there for two years, working in the Central Afghan mountains with returned refugees, teaching them creative agricultural techniques and becoming fluent in their native language, Dari (Persian).

In 2005, Costello returned to the United States, reuniting with his long-time creative partner, The OaKs' drummer Matthew Antolick. Costello and Antolick collaborated to create the band's first CD, "Our Fathers and The Things They Left Behind", lyrically inspired mostly by Costello's time spent in Afghanistan. The duo released the album independently in late summer 2006. They also partnered with Global Hope Network – an organization dedicated to helping impoverished refugees in Afghanistan – pledging 50% of CD and download sales towards their cause.

The self-released album was completely home recorded by the pair, mixed by Martin Feveyear of Jupiter Studios, Seattle (Modest Mouse, Damien Jurado), and mastered by Alan Douches of West West Side Music, NY (Sufjan Stevens).

Their diverse mix of instruments includes accordion, mandolin, bells, vibraphone, horns, assorted percussion, electronic organ and Wurlitzer, to name a few. Costello's lyrics range from self-examination to social critique. His songs are often about self-sacrificing figures such as Hugh Thompson and Dietrich Bonhoeffer, and he pulls inspiration from the Southern Gothic fiction of Flannery O'Conner and Carson McCullers.

In the winter of 2006, Costello and Antolick decided to expand the band, with the purposes of live performance and adding more outside influences to their established sound. After some trial and error, the band solidified their roster to include keyboardist Tim Cocking, lead guitarist Greg Willson, backup vocalist Melissa Reyes, and bassist Jeremy Siegel.

All of the members of The Oaks are multi-instrumentalists. During a typical Oaks show you are likely to see:

Reyes playing percussion and keys; Antolick playing various percussion instruments and keys; Cocking playing accordion, trumpet and keys; Siegel playing trombone, percussion, bass and keys; Willson playing alto saxophone and guitar; and Costello alternating between acoustic and electric guitars as well as lead and harmony vocals.

== Critical acclaim ==
Response to The Oaks has been overwhelmingly positive. In their short life-span The Oaks have established themselves not only in the central Florida scene, but nationally and internationally as well. Some notable performances/appearances:

Showcasing artist, 2006 AntiPop Music Festival, Orlando, FL
Featured artist, Orlando Sentinel Newspaper CD Compilation
Showcasing artist, 2007 Florida Music Festival – main stage
Featured artist, ORock 105.9 FM
Showcasing artist, CMJ Music Marathon 2007
Featured artist, Virb.com MUSIC feature page
Featured in Paste Magazine, July 2007 cover story – "Can Rock Save the World?"
Showcasing artist, CMJ Music Marathon, October 2007
Featured artist, Public Radio International's Fair Game With Faith Sallie, January 2008
Showcasing artist, SXSW Music Festival, March 2008
Showcasing artist, FMF Music Festival, May 2008

The Oaks have shared the stage with many groups, including The Six Parts Seven, Michelle Malone, and Caribou (musician)

On December 28, 2007, The Oaks' first album "Our Fathers and the Things They Left Behind" was named by Jim Abbott of the Orlando Sentinel as number 9 in his top 10 musical highlights of 2007. The Oaks were the only local group named, and joined such company as Radiohead, the Flaming Lips, Kanye West and Bruce Springsteen.

The band's second album, "Songs For Waiting", was released on March 3, 2008 with a promotional campaign run by Fanatic Promotion. The band was featured on Public Radio International's Fair Game in January 2008, and played at the SXSW music festival in Austin in March 2008, and the Florida Music Festival in May 2008.

== Future ==
The OaKs are currently working on long-distance collaboration with one another as lead singer Ryan Costello is attending graduate school at Oregon State University.

Ryan Costello released his first solo album, "After The Fire", on October 20, 2009, guest-featuring The OaKs' Matthew Antolick on drums and Greg Willson on horns. It was featured in Relevant Magazine and critically acclaimed by the Orlando Sentinel, Oregon's The Source Weekly, and the blog Ryan's Smashing Life. Since then Ryan has released two more solo albums.
