= Don Oakes (footballer) =

English footballer

Personal information
- Full name: Donald Joseph Oakes
- Date of birth: 8 October 1928
- Place of birth: Rhyl, Wales
- Date of death: 13 June 1977 (aged 48)
- Place of death: Islington, England
- Position: Left half

Youth career
- Downend ATC
- 1945–1946: Arsenal

Senior career*
Years	Team	Apps	(Gls)
1946–1955	Arsenal	11	(1)
Total		11	(1)
- * Club domestic league appearances and goals

Donald Joseph Oakes (8 October 1928 – 13 June 1977) was an English professional footballer who played as a left half.

== Early and personal life ==
Oakes was born in Rhyl, Wales. His father Alfred was also a professional footballer.

== Career ==
After playing in Bristol for Downend ATC, Oakes joined Arsenal as an amateur in December 1945, before turning professional seven months later.

He made 11 appearances in the Football League, scoring once, and scored eight goals in 158 Football Combination appearances.
