= Thousand Oaks (disambiguation) =

Thousand Oaks is a city in Ventura County, California.

Thousand Oaks may also refer to:

- Thousand Oaks, Berkeley, California
- Thousand Oaks Boulevard
- Thousand Oaks, Parkville, Missouri

== See also ==
- Thousand Oaks Freeway
- Thousand Oaks High School
- Thousand Oaks Library
- Thousand Oaks Civic Arts Plaza
- Thousand Oaks Community Gallery
- Thousand Oaks shooting, 8 November 2018
- Thousand Oaks Transit
- List of films shot in Thousand Oaks
- Norwegian Colony (Thousand Oaks)
- Oxnard–Thousand Oaks–Ventura metropolitan area
- The Oaks (Thousand Oaks, California)
- 7000 Oaks
