= Vivien Noakes =

Vivien Noakes (née Langley; 16 February 1937 – 17 February 2011) was a British biographer, editor and critic, an expert on Edward Lear and the literature of the First World War. She was a fellow of the Royal Society of Literature.

== Early life and education ==
She was born Vivien Mary Langley, daughter of aeronautical engineer Marcus Langley and educated at Dunottar School, leaving with A-levels. It was not until later in life that she took her degree at Manchester College, Oxford, and Somerville College, Oxford, where she was subsequently lecturer.

== Career ==
She lectured at Harvard University and at the Yale Center for British Art. She was a leading authority - per her Times obituary, "the world's leading authority" - on Edward Lear and on the literature of World War I.

== Personal life ==
She was married to the painter Michael Noakes, in collaboration with whom she produced The Daily Life of The Queen: An Artist's Diary (2000); the couple had three children.

She died of cancer the day after her 74th birthday, a month after suffering a stroke. She left copies of many of Lear's letters to Somerville College Library.

== Works ==
- Edward Lear, The Life of a Wanderer (1968). ISBN 978-0750937443 (2006 ed.)
- Edward Lear, 1812-1888 (1986). ISBN 978-0810912625
- The Painter Edward Lear (1991). ISBN 978-0715397787
- The Daily Life of The Queen: An Artist's Diary (2000) with Michael Noakes. ISBN 978-0091869823
- Voices of Silence (2006). ISBN 978-0750945219

== Links ==
- Michael and Vivien Noakes' website; accessed 10 April 2014.
