= Michael Noakes =

English painter (1933-2018)

- Born: 28 October 1933; UK
- Died: 30 May 2018 (aged 84)
- Occupations: Artist, portrait painter
- Spouse(s): Vivien Langley (m. 1960-2011; her death); 3 children

Michael Noakes (28 October 1933 – 30 May 2018) was an English artist and portrait painter.

He was educated at Downside School and the Royal Academy Schools. His prime interests as a painter were in portraiture and landscape. He was President of the Royal Institute of Oil Painters and Chairman of the Contemporary Portrait Society.

He was a Member of the Royal Society of Portrait Painters and a Freeman of the City of London. He painted actors, writers, academics, diplomats, politicians, lawyers, churchmen, senior military personnel, businessmen, leaders of the industry and members of the Royal Family.

He received a platinum disc for his sleeve design for the record Portrait of Sinatra (1977), the only painter ever to have been awarded such an honour. He has painted many of the world's leading figures. Among those who sat for him are Queen Elizabeth II, Queen Elizabeth the Queen Mother, King Charles III and Anne, Princess Royal, as well as most other members of the Royal Family. He was commissioned to paint Margaret Thatcher when she was Prime Minister.

He painted President Clinton, making preparatory studies with the President in the Oval Office – one of only very few painters to have been given such access to any President of the United States – and Pope Benedict XVI. Michael Noakes spent much of 1999 with the Queen, making sketches, paintings and drawings for the book The Daily Life of the Queen: An Artist's Diary, written by his late wife Vivien (died 2011), published September 2000. Somerville College, Oxford is in possession of some of his portraits.
