= Sergio Rossetti Morosini =

Brazilian-American artist and writer (born 1953)

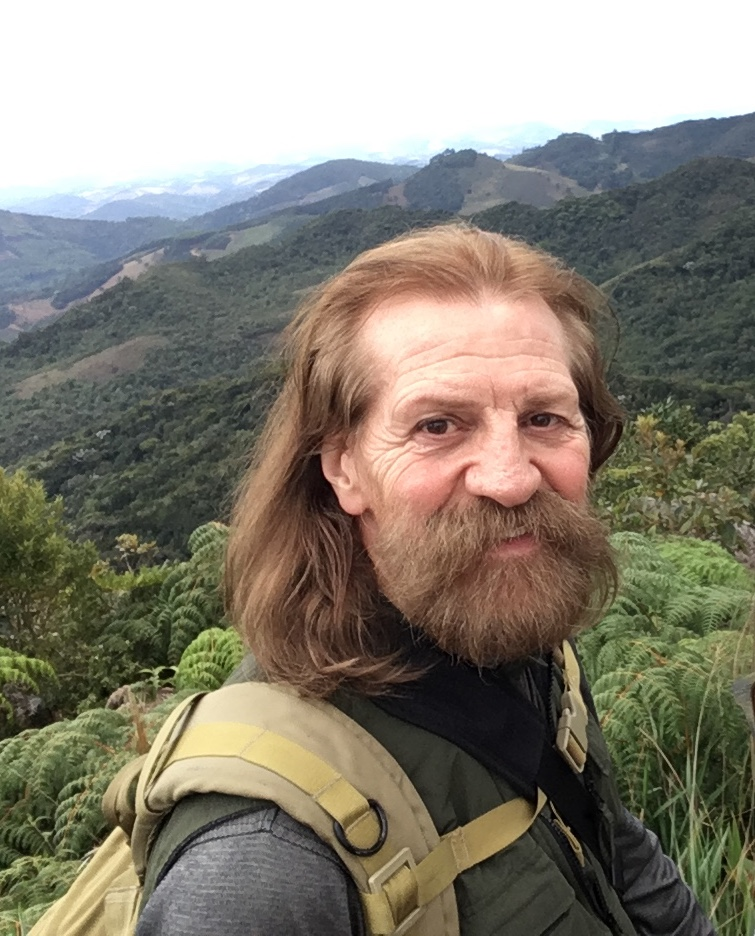
- Born: 3 November 1953 (age 72); Guarapuava, Paraná
- Education: Pratt Institute
- Spouse(s): Adèle Rossetti Morosini, née Lau (m. 1976)
- Children: Ana Rossetti Morosini, Sergio E. Rossetti Morosini
- Awards: Honorary Louisiana State Senator, 1975; Cantor Fitzgerald, 1992-95
- Website: www.atlanticforest911.com Academicinfluence.com

Sergio Rossetti Morosini (born November 3, 1953) is a contemporary Brazilian-American scholar, artist and author dedicated to preserving the Atlantic Forest and restoring the art in stone of New York City Landmarks.

== Early life ==
Sergio Rossetti Morosini is the middle of five children born to parents Pedro Rossetti and Italia Morosini, descendants of Italian immigrants that settled in Southern Brazil. Born and raised in the city of Guarapuava, in the heart of the state of Paraná's Araucaria Forest.

== Education ==
Sergio is educated in economics, diplomacy, and holds master's degrees in Fine Arts and History of Art from the Pratt Institute in Brooklyn, New York. where he later taught a Contemporary Sculpture and 3D illustration Course.

== Career and marriage ==
Rossetti Morosini has a dual art history and fine arts master's degree at the Pratt Institute and is currently working on a manuscript concerning technical issues of Titian's frescoes [432 Driggs Avenue, Brooklyn, NY, 11211]. There, while he was enrolled in the graduate program of Tulane University's Department of Social Sciences, he met the Cuban-born artist, Adèle Lau, then, a fine arts student at Tulane's Newcomb College. They were married in 1976 in Caracas, Venezuela.

== International affairs ==
Through numerous cultural events, and partnerships with Loyola and Tulane Universities, and later with the newly founded New Orleans Area Latin American Chamber of Commerce, he worked diligently with New Orleans Mayor Moon Landrieu's administration, the International Relations Office, the International Trade Mart, and the Board of Commissioners of the Port of New Orleans to unite the Latin American businesses behind a comprehensive trade policy through the ports of New Orleans and Gulfport-Biloxi, Mississippi. He was conferred the title of "Honorary State Senator" by the Lieutenant Governor, James Edward "Jimmy" Fitzmorris, Jr., Coordinator of International Relations and President of the Louisiana State Senate.

== Cultural institutes ==
He is a founding member of the Brazilian-American Cultural Institute of New Orleans (BACI). and The Brazilian-American Chamber of Commerce of New Orleans.

== The Vatican ==
Sergio has been invited twice to the Vatican to view from the scaffolding, the restoration of the frescoes Michelangelo painted on the Sistine, the private Chapel of the Pope. First, in early Fall 1987, as a guest of the Agnelli family and the curator of the Vatican Museums, Fabrizio Mancinelli, during the Restoration and controversy of the ceiling, and later, in the Summer of 1992, to view the restoration of The Last Judgment with Dr. Diana Gisolfi of the Pratt Institute, as guests of Marilyn Perry, president of the Kress Foundation and the Head Restorer for Papal Monuments, Museums and Galleries, Gianluigi Colalucci.

== Art historical contribution ==
First to observe that in 1511, Titian described the volume in a two-dimensional fresco painting of Saint Anthony's Miracle of the Jealous Husband, in the Scuola del Santo, Padua, Italy, by actually sculpting it in relief rather than describing it illusionistically.

== Works in stone ==
He is devoted to the conservation of the Art in the New York City Landmarks.

Among his works are the Historical Landmark Charles Millard Pratt House, 241 Clinton Ave, Brooklyn, NY 11205 in Brooklyn's Clinton Hill Historic District, now the home of the Roman Catholic Bishop of Brooklyn, the Brockholst building at 101 W 85th Street, and Columbus Avenue, NY, NY 10024, and his Bust of Michelangelo Buonarroti above the door of the National Arts Club, 15 Gramercy Park South in the borough of Manhattan in New York City, both a New York City Landmark and a National Historic Landmark.

== Environmental work ==
Sergio shot a documentary on the endangered ecosystems of the Atlantic Forest of Brazil, Paraguay, and Argentina.

In 2007, he moved his studios from Brooklyn to Poughkeepsie, New York.

== Gallery ==
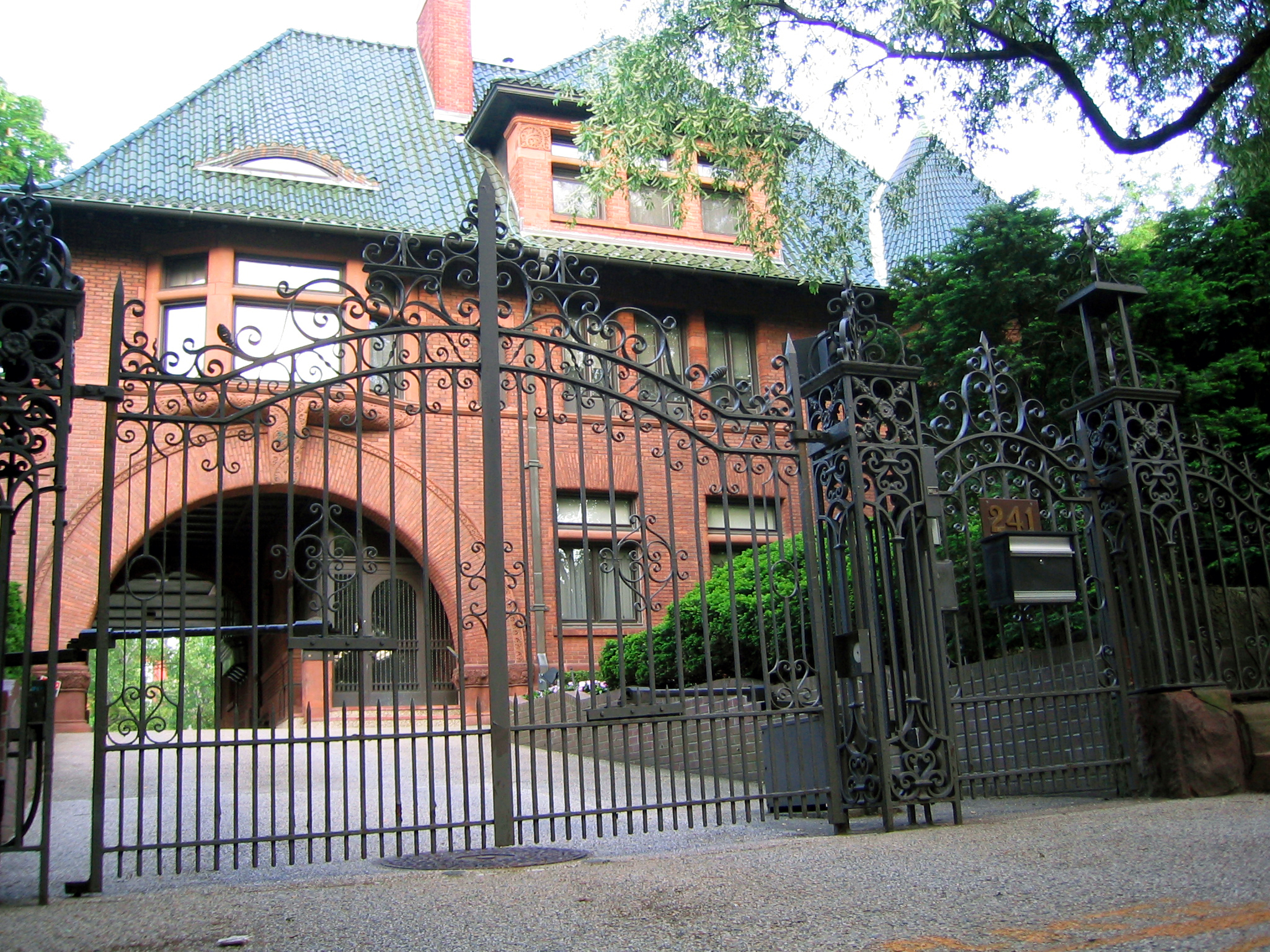
Historical Landmark Charles Millard Pratt House, 241 Clinton Avenue, Brooklyn, NY 11205

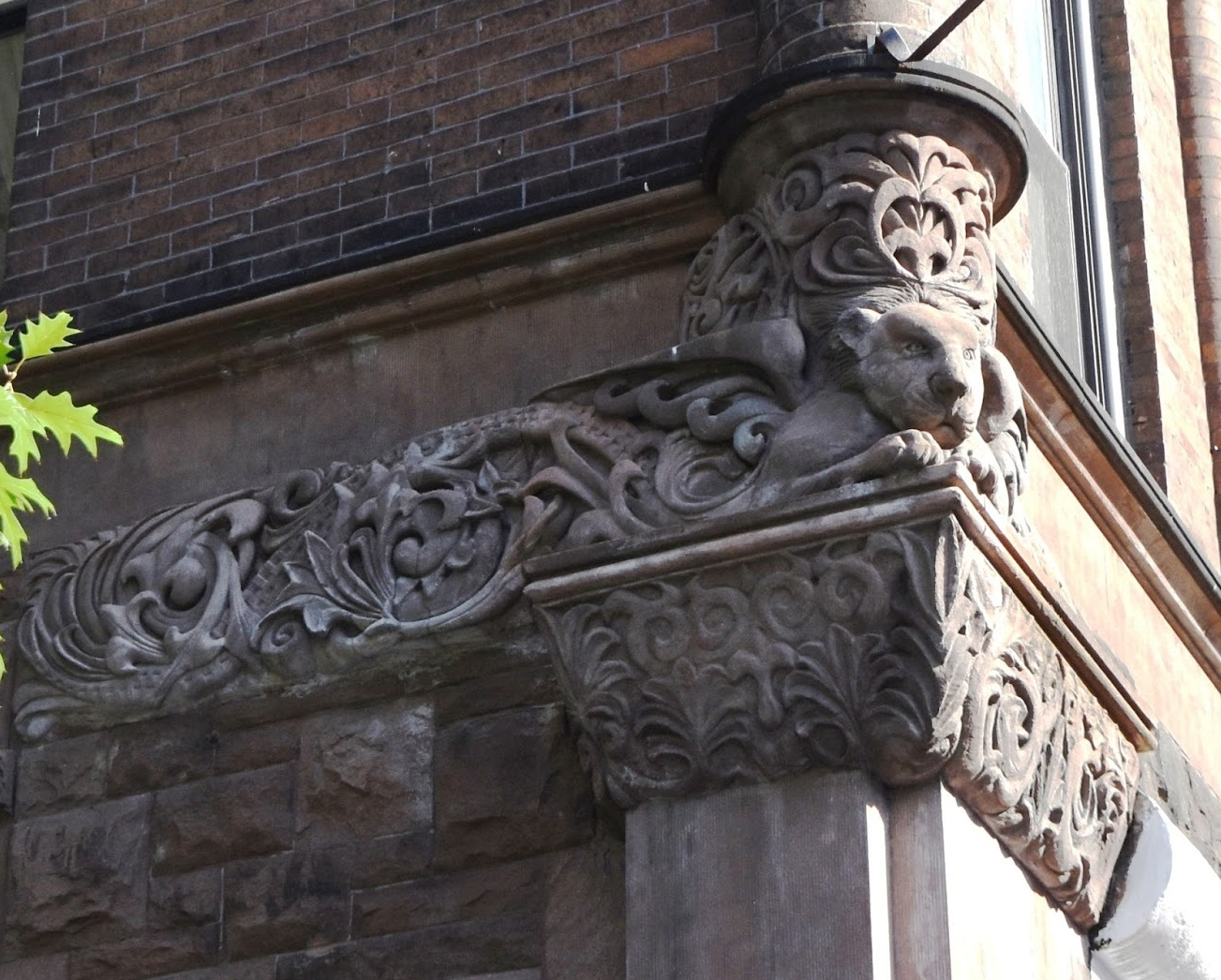
The Winged Lioness, stone, sculpted by Sergio Rossetti Morosini, on the Façade of the NYC Landmark Brockholst Building. (photo Tom Miller)

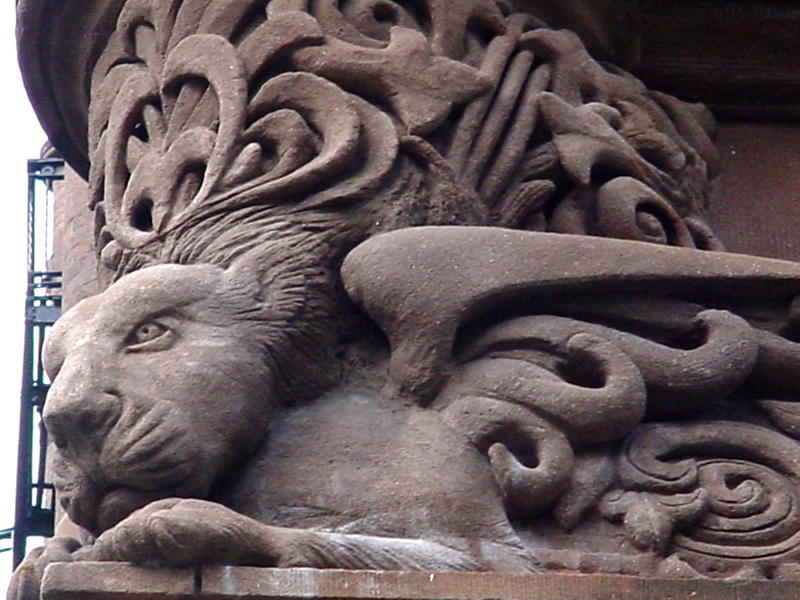
The Crouching, Winged Lioness, stone, sculpted by Sergio Rossetti Morosini, on the Façade of the Brockholst Building, Landmark West Central Park, NYC

The Bust of Michelangelo, stone, sculpted by Sergio Rossetti Morosini, on the Façade of the National Historic New York City Landmark, The National Arts Club

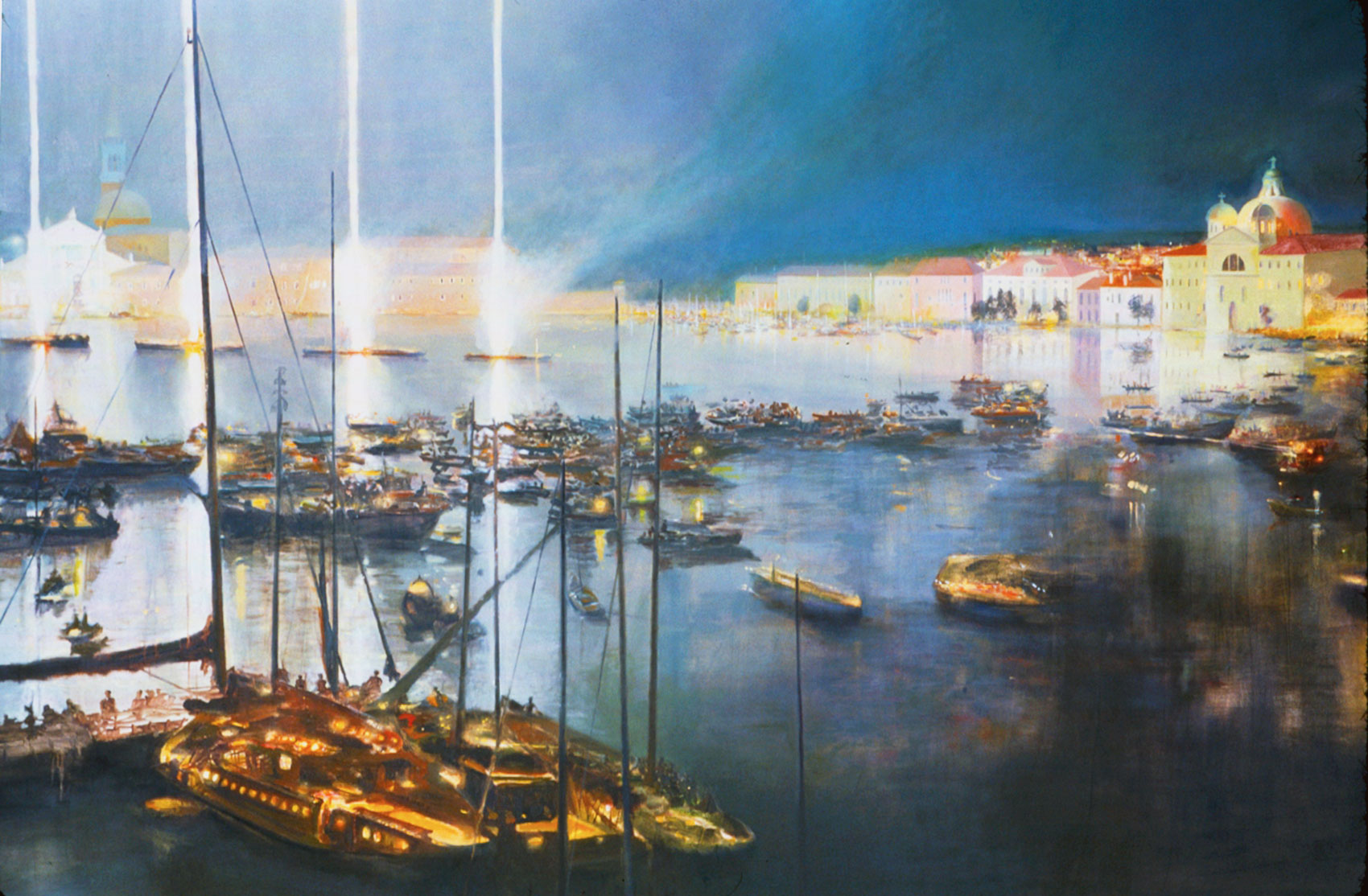
Fireworks: The Night of the Redentore, oil painting, 79"x110", by Sergio Rossetti Morosini, 1995
