= ArtWatch International =

American non-profit organization

ArtWatch International is an American nonprofit organization founded by James Beck, professor of art history at Columbia University, to monitor, and campaign for better practices in, the conservation of art works. The United Kingdom branch, ArtWatch UK, is run by Michael Daley.

== Activities ==
In 1991, Beck criticised the cleaning of Jacopo della Quercia's sculpture, the tomb of Ilaria del Carretto in Lucca cathedral in Italy. As a result, the conservator sued him for "aggravated slander", which carries a possible three-year prison sentence. Beck won the case and subsequently co-founded ArtWatch.

ArtWatch has been critical of many conservation practices and projects, including the restoration of Leonardo da Vinci's The Last Supper and the restoration of the Sistine Chapel frescoes. In 2004, it raised an unsuccessful petition to halt the restoration of Michelangelo's David, which has since been found to be developing cracks.

ArtWatch UK have included a commemorative issue on the late James Beck; a report on the damage to artworks in transit for blockbuster exhibitions; and articles critical of the results of restorations on modern painters like Gustav Klimt. The November 2008 ArtWatch UK journal contained 20 articles campaigning about developments in the UNESCO-protected city of Saint Petersburg.

Beck was, and Daley is, frequently outspoken and their opinions on recent restorations have been covered regularly by the press. However, they have been equally strongly opposed by those they criticise. The Surveyor of the Fabric of St. Paul's Cathedral, who oversaw a 2004 cleaning of the cathedral that came under fire by Daley, retorted that "ArtWatch UK sounds very grand, but seems to be the view of one person." The investigation of the restoration campaign had been conducted and written by art historian, Florence Hallett.

== Ludwig Burchard ==
In April 2006 the ArtWatch UK Journal published research into Ludwig Burchard, a scholar who had made many attributions to Rubens. This showed that Burchard had been prepared to make false attributions for commercial gain. It again called into question the authenticity of the National Gallery's Samson and Delilah—and the integrity of the then director Neil MacGregor. The research was conducted by Dr. Kasia Pisarek.

== See also ==
- Art conservation and restoration
- Frank Herbert Mason Artwatch activist and artist
