= Madonna and Child (Duccio, Metropolitan) =

Painting by Duccio di Buoninsegna in the Metropolitan Museum of Art

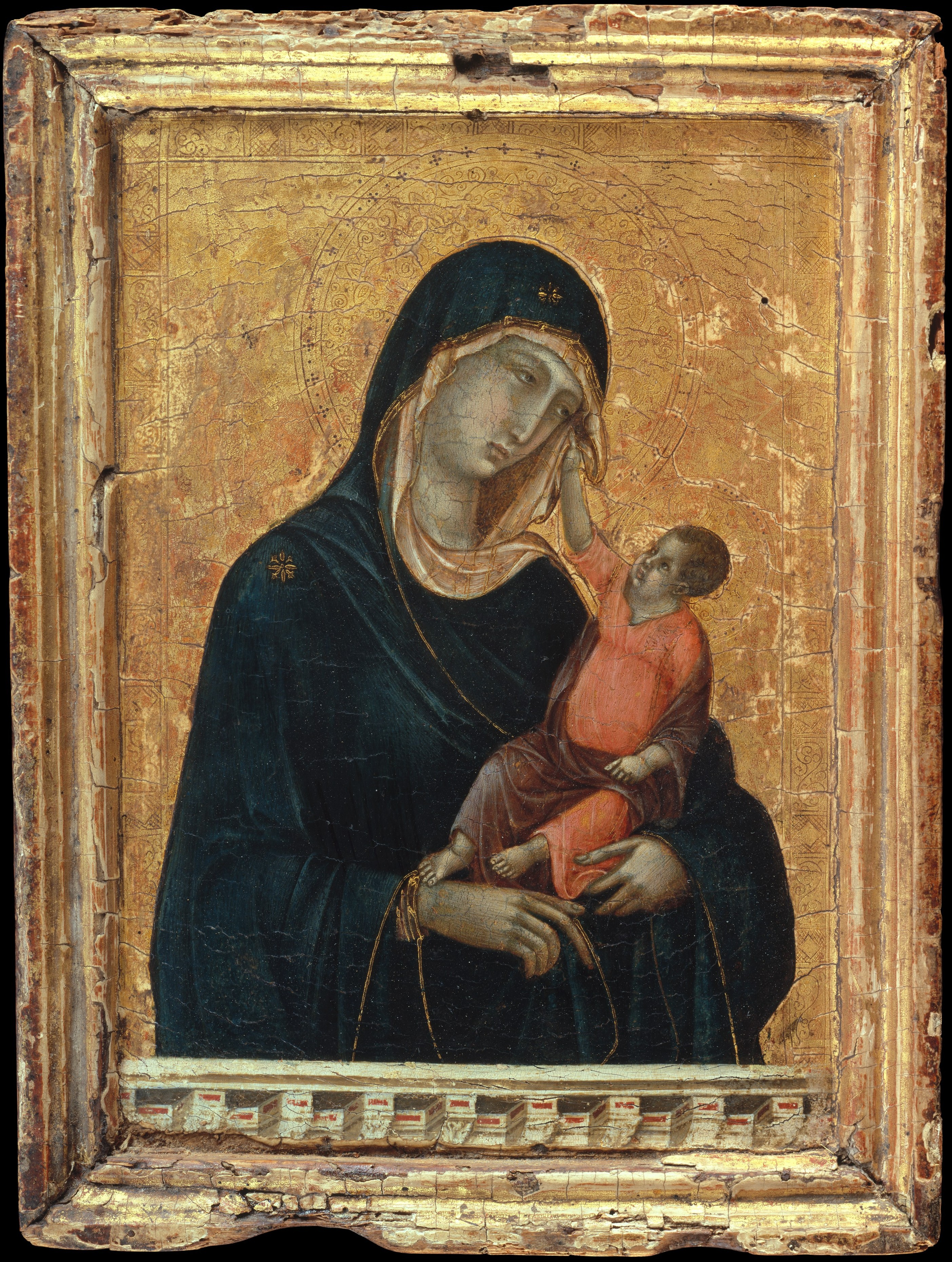
- Artist: Duccio
- Year: c. 1300
- Medium: Tempera
- Dimensions: 27.9 cm × 21 cm (11.0 in × 8.3 in)
- Location: Metropolitan Museum of Art, New York

Madonna and Child is a depiction of the Virgin and Child painted by Duccio di Buoninsegna, one of the most influential artists of the late 13th and early 14th centuries. The work is celebrated for stylistic innovations that introduced realism into Italian depictions of this subject.

== Description and influences ==
Compared to frescoes and to larger, grander altarpieces, the Madonna and Child—a compact work measuring 11×8 1/8 inches—is understood to be an tranquil devotional image. Intimations of this reading appear in the burnt edges at the bottom of the original engaged frame, likely caused by lit candles positioned directly underneath.

Despite the terse simplicity of the image, the painting reflects some of the changes Duccio was applying to the depiction of religious figures during the early 14th century. Guided by innovative Italian artists of the time such as Giotto, Duccio moved beyond the purely iconic Byzantine and Italo-Byzantine canon.

== Aesthetic influences ==
In his 2005 description of the Metropolitan Museum of Art's acqusition of the painting, the Met curator Keith Christiansen proposed that the colors applied to the garments, the folds of the fabric, the details on the underside of the Virgin's veil, and the childish reach of the hand of the infant all reflect the spirit of humanism emerging in 13th- and 14th-century Italy. These qualities, he argued, would shape the sensibility of later Sienese painting and make Duccio's Madonna and Child worthy of attention. Details of Byzantine tradition found in the image are characteristic of earlier works of Duccio. Christiansen pointed to tooled details in the gold ground and punched designs employed for the halos and the border design.

== History of ownership ==
As is common for duecento and trecento paintings, the ownership and location of the Madonna and Child before the mid 19th century is unknown. The earliest known owner of the painting was the Russian Count Gregori Stroganoff (1829–1910), who reported having found it, unattributed, in a dealer's shop. In 1904 he lent it to an exhibition at the Palazzo Pubblico of Siena (Mostra d’arte antica senese). He kept it in his palazzo in Rome.

Upon Stroganoff's death in 1910, the Duccio joined the collection of Adolphe Stoclet (1871–1949), thus earning its designation as The Stoclet Madonna. Stoclet was understood to treat his extensive collection of art with care. The Duccio was shown at several exhibitions in 1930 and 1935 and to select guests at Stoclet's home.

Following the deaths, in 1949, of Adolph Stoclet and his wife, the collection, including Duccio's Madonna and Child, passed to their children. Although the work was of interest to scholars, it could be viewed only in photographs taken before and after the restoration and minor retouching it underwent during its time with the Stoclet family. The painting was acquired in autumn 2004 by the Metropolitan Museum of Art for an estimated 45 million USD. This acquisition was noteworthy for its place in the history of art and for its rarity—there are only 13 known paintings by Duccio in the world.

== Controversy ==
The chronology of Duccio's Madonna and Child is subject to ongoing scholarly debate. There is a gap of more than 20 years in the artist's life during which no works by Duccio have been found, which making the estimated date of the Madonna and Child—around 1300—impossible to confirm. The Byzantine qualities of the painting that suggest earlier composition—the oval shape of the Virgin's face, her long nose, and the “miniature man” nature of Christ Child—are combined with innovative elements that date it later, such as the parapet depicted at the bottom of the painting, which serves to separate the viewer from the space occupied by the Virgin and the Christ Child. Commentators have likened the parapet to a barrier between the vernacular world and the sacred.

== Attribution ==
The late James Beck, Professor of Art History at Columbia University in New York, believed that Duccio's Madonna and Child, which the Met dates to 1300, is the work of a 19th-century artist and possibly a forger. This claim was based on stylistic analysis. He pointed to what he considered to be the low quality of the painting and to details that he argued had not yet appeared in art of the alleged period, writing: "We are asked to believe that the modest little picture represents a leap into the future of Western painting by establishing a plane in front of Mary and the Child. This feature, a characteristic of Renaissance not Medieval pictures, occurs only a hundred years after the presumptive date of the picture ...". Beck's conclusions were published in 2007 in his book From Duccio to Raphael: Connoisseurship in Crisis in which he also disputes the attribution of the National Gallery of London's painting Madonna of the Pinks to Raphael.

Christiansen, the Met's curator of European paintings, disagrees with Beck's contention. Christiansen has noted that, in addition to stylistic analysis of the painting in relation to Duccio's oeuvre, the museum conducted a thorough material examination which included the wooden panel's construction, the painting's underdrawing, and pigment composition. These features were found to be consistent with an attribution to Duccio and a date of around 1300. According to Christiansen, "What everyone else sees as a sign of quality and innovation, Beck sees as weakness. There is no reason to doubt the period and authenticity of the picture."
