= Gianluigi Colalucci =

Italian fresco restorer (1929–2021)

- Born: 24 December 1929; Rome, Italy
- Died: 28 March 2021 (aged 91); Rome, Italy
- Occupation(s): Restorer, academic
- Spouse: Daniela Bartoletti Colalucci

Gianluigi Colalucci (24 December 1929 – 28 March 2021) was an Italian Master Restorer and academic most known for being the chief restorer of the Sistine Chapel in the Vatican City from 1980 to 1994.

== Career ==
Colalucci graduated in the restoration of painting on wood, mural, and canvas, from the Istituto Centrale del Restauro in 1953, where he was a pupil of Cesare Brandi.

Colalucci began working with the Vatican in 1960, and between 1980 and 1994 led the restoration of the Sistine Chapel frescoes, directing a team of twelve, and removing centuries of smoke, dust, glue, varnishes, and wine which had dulled the frescoes, as well as allowing art historians to visit the chapel during this work and observe the team's restoration technique. He initially faced opposition, with art historian James Beck describing the restoration as an "artistic Chernobyl", and with prominent artists including Andy Warhol, Robert Motherwell, George Segal, Robert Rauschenberg petitioning Pope John Paul II to pause the work; Colalucci said art scholars "preferred a brooding Michelangelo", and because of the restoration "there's a younger generation of art historians just waiting the interpret him differently".

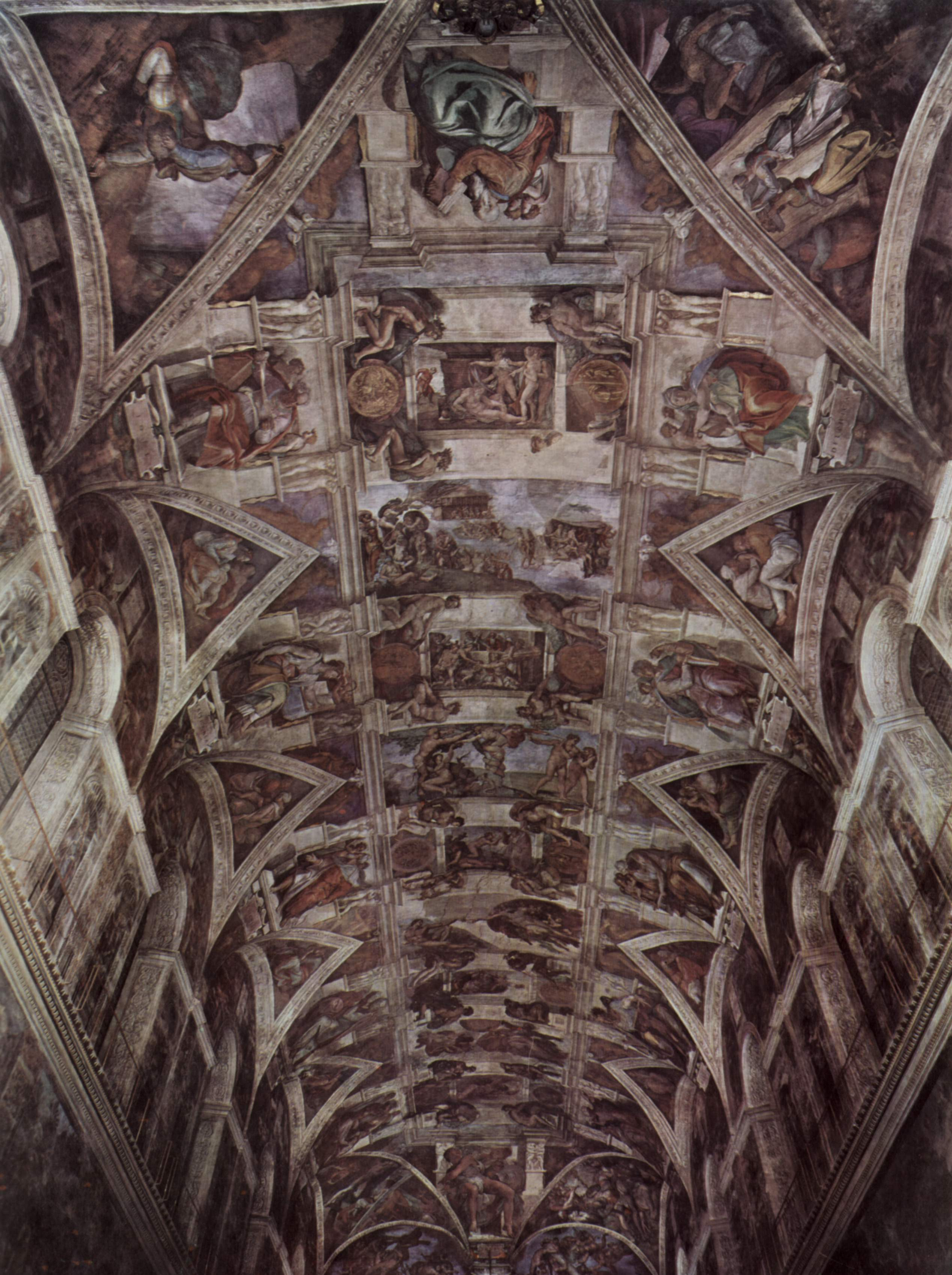
The Sistine Chapel ceiling, before restoration

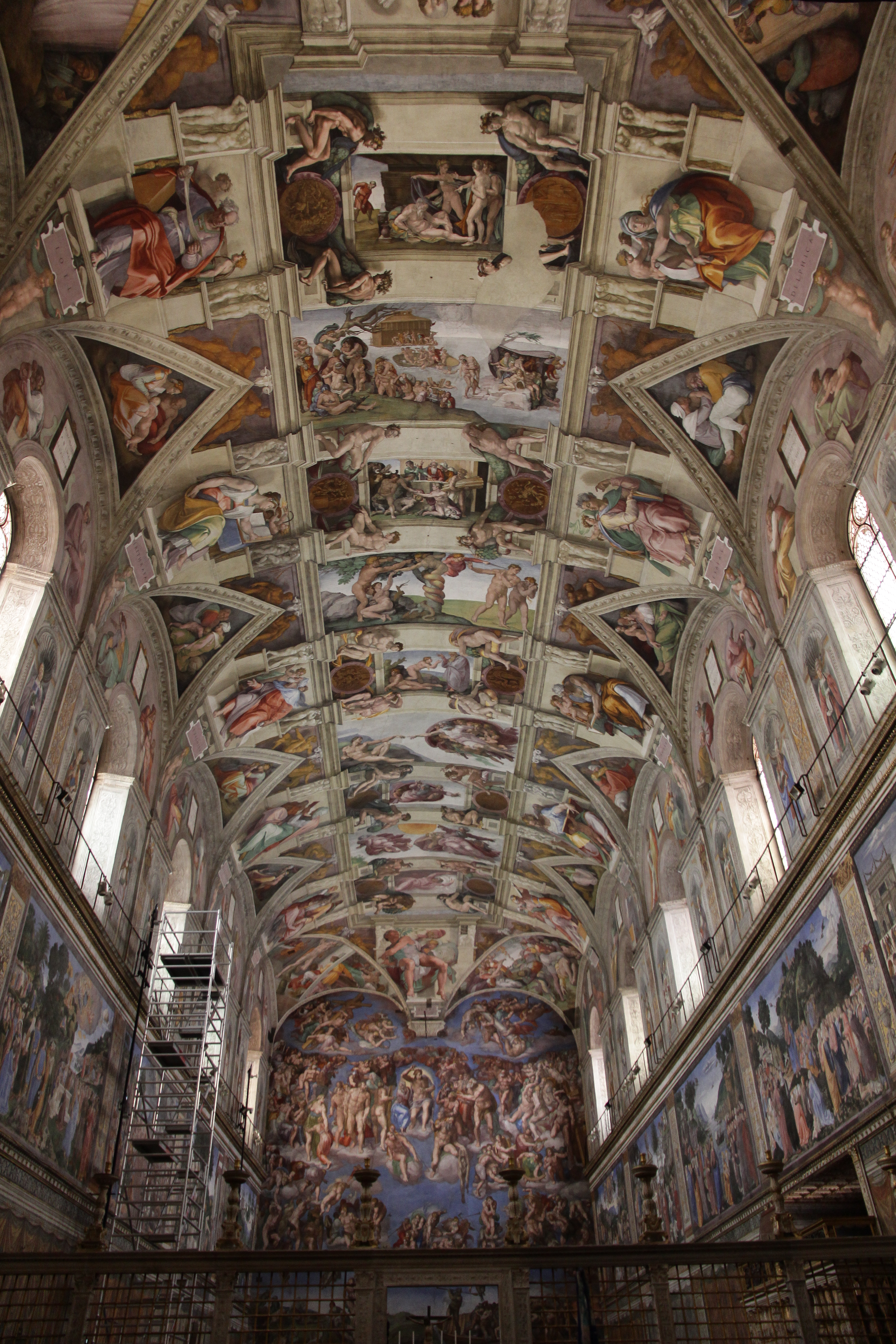
The Sistine Chapel ceiling, after restoration. Michelangelo's The Last Judgment visible at the end of the chapel

The work included restoring Michelangelo's work The Last Judgment, and the vaulted Sistine Chapel ceiling also painted by Michelangelo. Additionally, loincloths and coverings painted over the initial work to cover nudity were removed, reverting part of what has been dubbed as the fig-leaf campaign. A year before his death, in an interview with the Vatican Museums he reflected on the risk of the restoration, saying "If these two brushstrokes get ruined while you are cleaning, you are lost. The painting is lost. We are all lost", saying he reflected on it before starting the restoration, "then I faced it", "it did not betray me".

The Vatican Museum attributed the current "dazzling splendour" of the works to Colalucci's restoration effort, and a Queen's Quarterly contributor suggested "every book on Michelangelo would now have to be rewritten" due to the vibrant colours and details that are now visible. In a New York Times obituary, Carmen C. Bambach, a curator at the Metropolitan Museum of Art and Renaissance scholar is quoted as saying, "It changed art history. All of a sudden there was a new Michelangelo."

For his work restoring the Sistine Chapel frescoes, in 1991 he was awarded the honorary degree Doctor Honoris Causa by New York University, and the same degree in 1995 by the Polytechnic University of Valencia. He was a consultant with the University of Lleida.

He retired from the Vatican Museums in 1995, a year after the restoration work had finished.

He wrote several books and articles on, as well as teaching about the restoration of frescoes. He restored works by Giotto in the Scrovegni Chapel, and the works of Raphael, Titian, and Buonamico Buffalmacco, among others. From 2009, he worked as a technical director of restoration with the Camposanto Monumentale di Pisa, including supervising works such as the restoration of The Triumph of Death by Buffalmacco, which was then re-located back to its original location. Until recently before his death, he continued to give advice on restoration and conservation efforts relating to the Sistine Chapel, including the Room of Constantine.

== Personal life ==
Colalucci was born in Rome, Italy, in 1929, being the son of a lawyer.

His wife Daniela is also a conservator, with one son having worked as a restorer and the other having a degree in Art History.

He had "heart ailments", and died on 28 March 2021 in Rome, Italy, at the age of 91.

He and his wife Daniela Bartoletti Colalucci had received a private tour of the Vatican Museums along with museums director Barbara Jatta "only a few days" before his death.

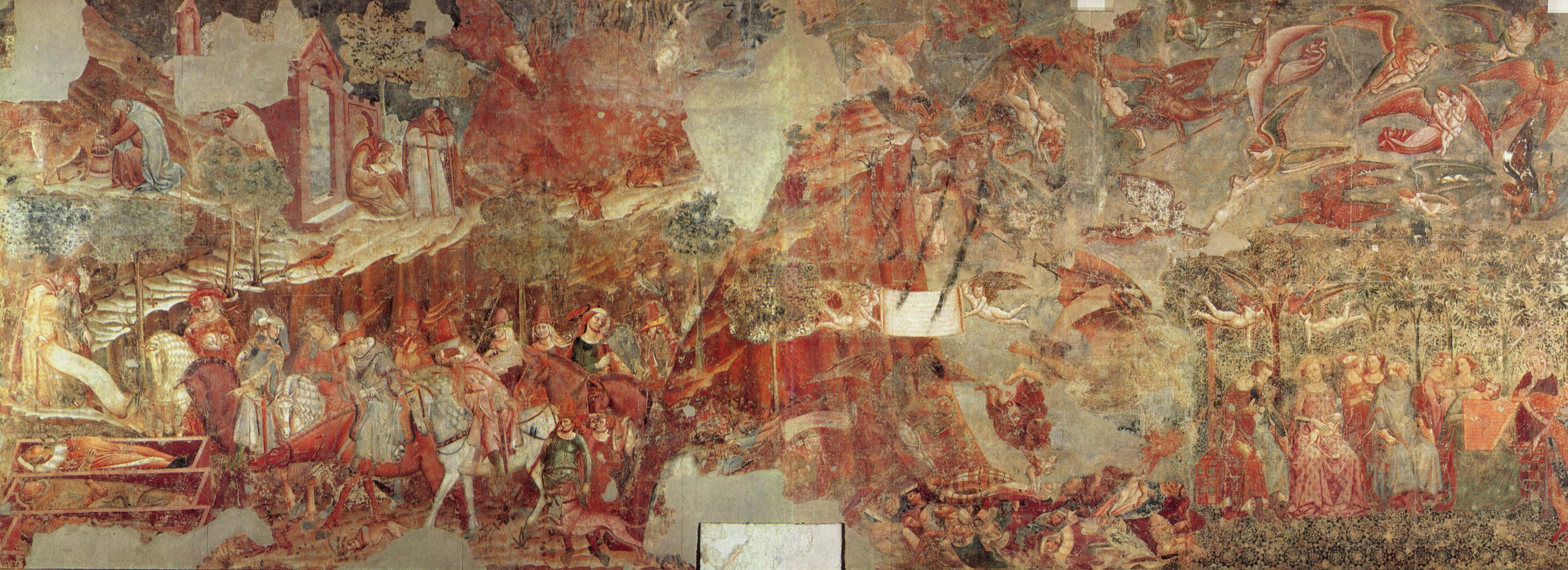
Buffalmacco's The Triumph of Death, pre-restoration

== Selected works ==
- Hirst, Michael; Colalicci, Gianluigi (1994). The Sistine Chapel : a glorious restoration. New York: H.N. Abrams. ISBN 978-0-8109-8176-8.
- Vecchi, Pierluigi; Colalicci, Gianluigi (1996). Michelangelo : the Vatican frescoes. New York: Abbeville Press Pub. ISBN 978-0-7892-0142-3.
- Colalucci, Gianluigi (2016). Michelangelo and I: Facts, People, Surprises, Discoveries in the Restoration of the Sistine Chapel. Città del Vaticano Milan: Edizioni Musei Vaticani 24 ORE Cultura. ISBN 978-8866483212.
- Partridge, Loren; Colalicci, Gianluigi (2000). Michelangelo - the Last Judgment : a glorious restoration. New York: Abradale Press/Harry N. Abrams. ISBN 978-0-8109-8190-4.
