= The Creation of the Sun, Moon, and Plants =

1511 Sistine Chapel fresco by Michelangelo

The Creation of the Sun, Moon and Vegetation
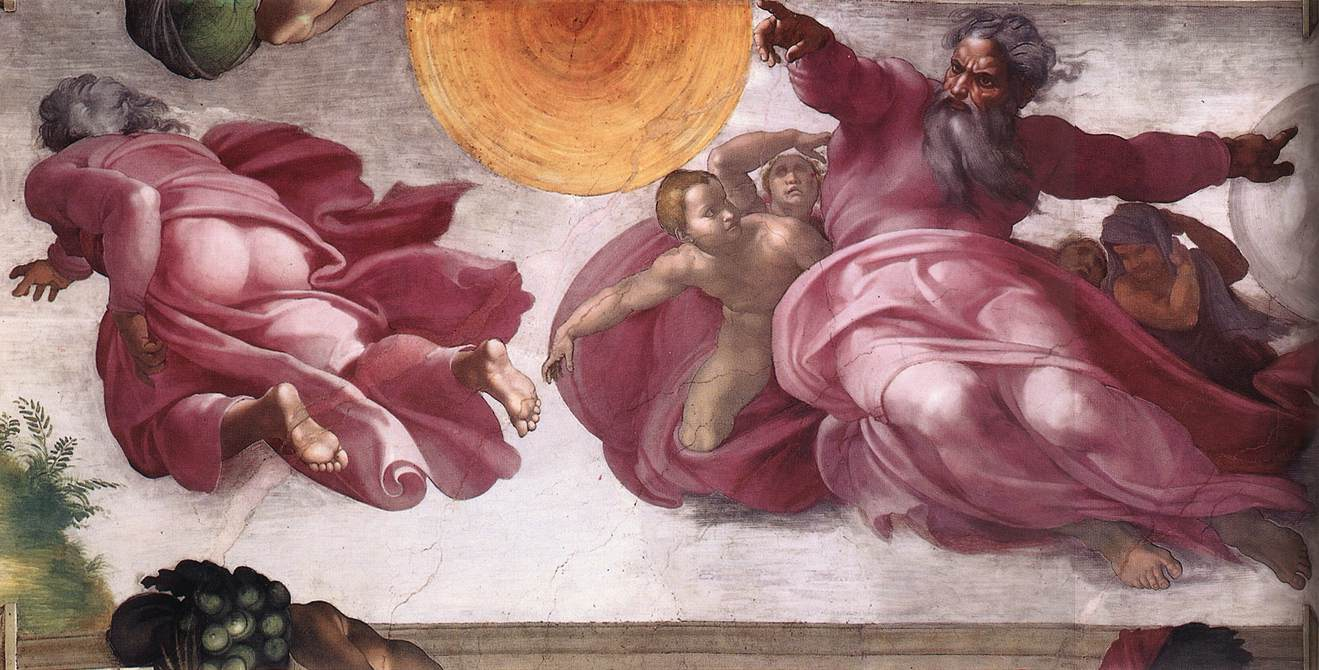
- Artist: Michelangelo
- Year: 1511
- Type: Fresco
- Dimensions: 280 cm × 570 cm (110 in × 220 in)
- Location: Sistine Chapel, Vatican City

The Creation of the Sun, Moon and Plants (sometimes The Creation of the Sun, Moon and Vegetation or The Creation of the Sun and the Moon) is one of the frescoes from Michelangelo's nine Books of Genesis scenes on the Sistine Chapel ceiling. It is the second scene in the chronological sequence on the ceiling, depicting the third and fourth day of the Creation narrative together in one panel.

On the left side of the painting God is depicted from behind, extending his arm towards a bush, alluding to the plant world. On the right side another image of God points towards the Sun with his right hand and toward the faint Moon with his left. His face expresses the force needed for the creation of the abode of living beings. The abstract patterns of drapery emphasise the motion of both figures of God.

The Creation of the Sun, Moon and Plants is featured on the postage stamps of Vatican City (issue of 1994) and India (issue of 1975).

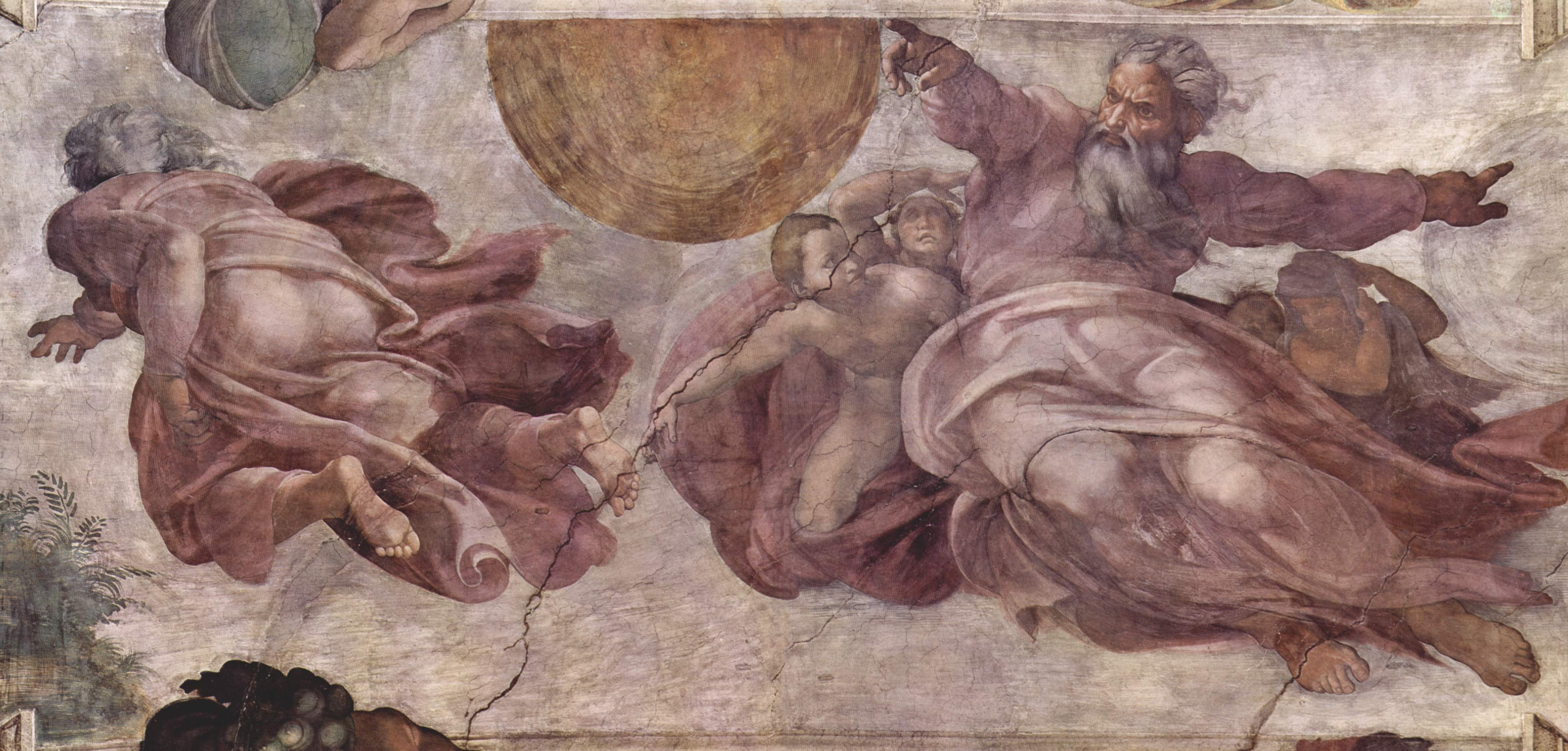
The painting before the restoration of the Sistine Chapel frescoes

== See also ==
- List of works by Michelangelo
