= James Beck (art historian) =

American art historian (1930–2007)

James H. Beck (May 14, 1930 – May 26, 2007) was an American art historian specializing in the Italian Renaissance. He was an outspoken critic of many high-profile restorations and re-attributions of artworks, and founded the pressure group ArtWatch International to campaign against irresponsible practices in the art world.

== Biography ==
James Beck was born in 1930 in New Rochelle, New York, a short distance away (as he was known to boast) from Thomas Paine's former house in that city. After graduating from Oberlin College in 1952 he trained as a painter, firstly at New York University and then at the Accademia di Belle Arti in Florence. At Columbia University he undertook his doctoral dissertation, on the sculpture of Jacopo della Quercia, under the supervision of Rudolf Wittkower. Beck was granted a PhD in 1963 and he published his monograph on the sculptor in 1992. He remained on the art history faculty at Columbia for his entire life, serving as Professor of Italian Renaissance painting and sculpture from 1972.

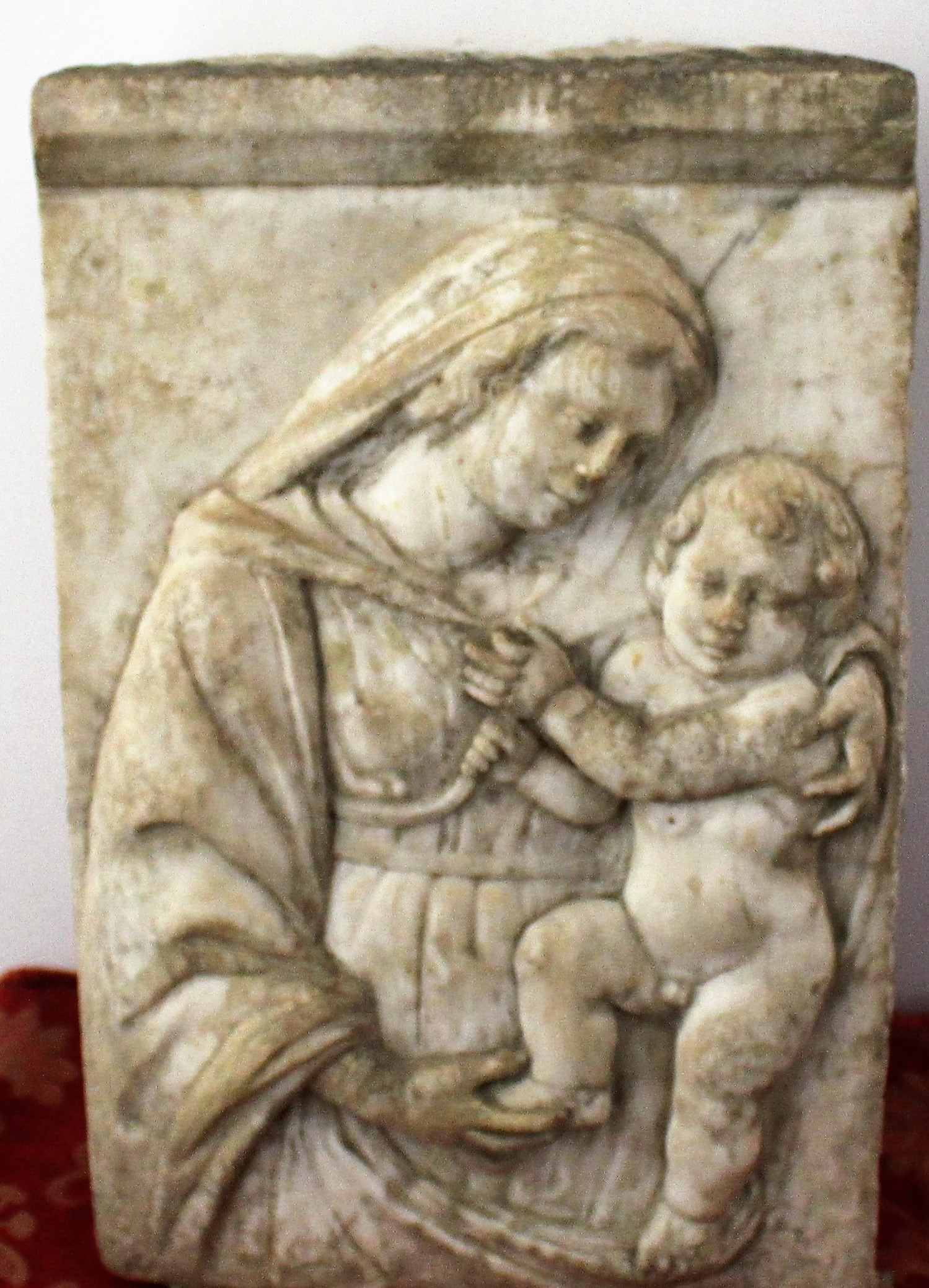
Madonna di Agliano, attributed by Beck to Jacopo della Quercia

== Founding of ArtWatch International ==
A turning-point in Beck's career came in 1991 when, as the world's authority on Jacopo della Quercia, he was invited to comment on a recent restoration of one of the sculptor's works, an Effigy of Ilaria del Carretto in Lucca Cathedral. Beck's enraged response was recorded by two reporters for newspapers based in Florence and Livorno, and in further interviews published in La Stampa (of Turin) and Il Giornale dell'Arte (based in Allesandria) he continued to voice his indignation at what he deemed a ruinous cleaning job. The sculpture's restorer, Dr. Gianni Caponi, filed lawsuits against him in the courts of all four cities citing criminal defamation, an offense punishable by up to three years imprisonment in Italy.

Eventually, Beck won all four cases, and his success prompted him to establish ArtWatch International the subsequent year. The organization's other founding member was Michael Daley, a British art historian with whom Beck co-wrote Art Restoration: The Culture, the Business and the Scandal in 1993. The book was an attack on the profession of art restoration, and was especially critical of the cleaning of Michelangelo's Sistine Chapel frescoes which was at that time nearing completion. Beck also publicly criticized the attribution of both the Metropolitan Museum's Stroganoff Madonna (which it bought in 2001) to Duccio and the Madonna of the Pinks —the National Gallery's major acquisition of 2004— to Raphael. He argued for the de-attribution of these works in his study From Duccio to Raphael: Connoisseurship in Crisis, published posthumously in 2007.

== Discoveries ==
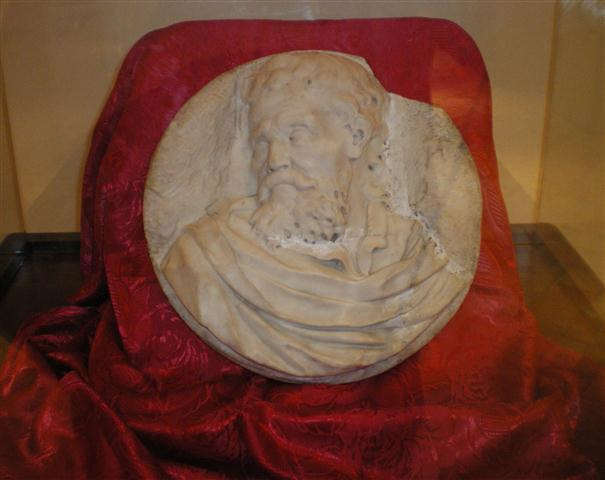
Self-portrait of Michelangelo

A round marble portrait relief of Michelangelo discovered by James Beck, 36 cm in diameter, was reported in the "Michelangelo Assoluto" Scripta Maneant Editions of 2012 by Alessandro Vezzosi and presentations by Claudio Strinati. Beck's discovery of the marble relief of the Madonna di Agliano by Jacopo della Quercia is mentioned in Studi di storia dell'arte in onore di Mina Gregori by Miklós Boskovits.
