= Kasia Pisarek =

- Born: Warsaw, Poland
- Other names: Katarina Pisarek; Katarzyna Krzyżagórska-Pisarek

Kasia Pisarek (born Katarzyna Krzyżagórska) is an art expert in London, specializing in Old Masters.

== Education ==
Katarzyna Krzyżagórska was born in Warsaw, Poland. She holds several academic degrees. She was educated at the Sorbonne, Paris, and at the University of Warsaw.

At the Sorbonne she was awarded a master's degree in Art History (1984) and she then studied for a Doctorate in Art History at the University of Warsaw. Having submitted a dissertation on Rubens and Connoisseurship: On the problems of attribution and rediscovery in British and American collections (late 19th-20th century) (in English), she was awarded a Ph.D. in Art History (2009).

She also completed a course on restoration of The Old Masters' paintings in Paris at the studio of Andre Mielniczek in Paris.

== Career ==
Dr. Pisarek has lived and worked as an art historian and an art expert in North Africa, Paris, Rome, Milan, and the UK. She currently lives across Europe with her family. Her particular areas of interest are Rubens, Rembrandt, and J. M. W. Turner.

Dr. Pisarek has 20 years experience in researching Old Masters paintings specifically in the area of attributions. She works between London, Vienna and Warsaw as an independent scholar/art expert and researcher. Her research on Rubens' controversial painting, Samson and Delilah, from the National Gallery of London, and the activities of Ludwig Burchard, the prominent Rubens expert, was published in the Sunday Times, The Times, and other European and American broadsheets.

Dr. Pisarek is the book editor for the London magazine, ArtWatch UK Journal, which monitors and campaigns for better practices in the conservation of art works.

She is also an art critic for the Polish art magazine, Sztuka.pl in Cracow, and Barok in Warsaw. She covers major art exhibitions and has over forty full-length articles published to date as well as two books.

Dr Pisarek was mentioned in the New York Times regarding Leonardo da Vinci's 'La Bella Principessa'

== Publications ==
Pisarek has published two books:

1. The English Way of Life (Życie po angielsku), Warsaw, 2005;
2. Life of the English Upper Classes (Życie wyższych sfer w Anglii), (Warsaw, 2011)

and numerous articles including:

1. 'Pod schodami - 400 lat portretow brytyjskiej sluzby', Barok. Historia-Literatura-Sztuka, XII/2, 24, (2005);
1. 'The Samson and Delilah - a question of attribution', ArtWatch UK Journal, n. 21, spring (2006);
2. 'Appraising today's appraisers', ArtWatch UK Journal, n.22, Autumn (2007)
3. 'Is Connoisseurship in crisis?' The Jackdaw, A Newsletter for the Visual Arts, n. 70, July/August (2007);
4. 'The Man who Re-invented the Louvre', ArtWatch UK Journal, n.23, Spring (2008).
5. 'Rubens: mistrzowskie poczatki', Barok, Historia-Literatura-Sztuka, XIII, 25, (2006);
6. 'Powrót ‘Samsona i Dalili’ do Antwerpii', Barok, Historia-Literatura-Sztuka, XV/1 (29) (2008)
7. 'Pricing the Masterly touch', ArtWatch UK Journal, n. 26, summer (2010);
8. 'Turner: Early Oils' (forthcoming);
