= Restoration of the Sistine Chapel frescoes =

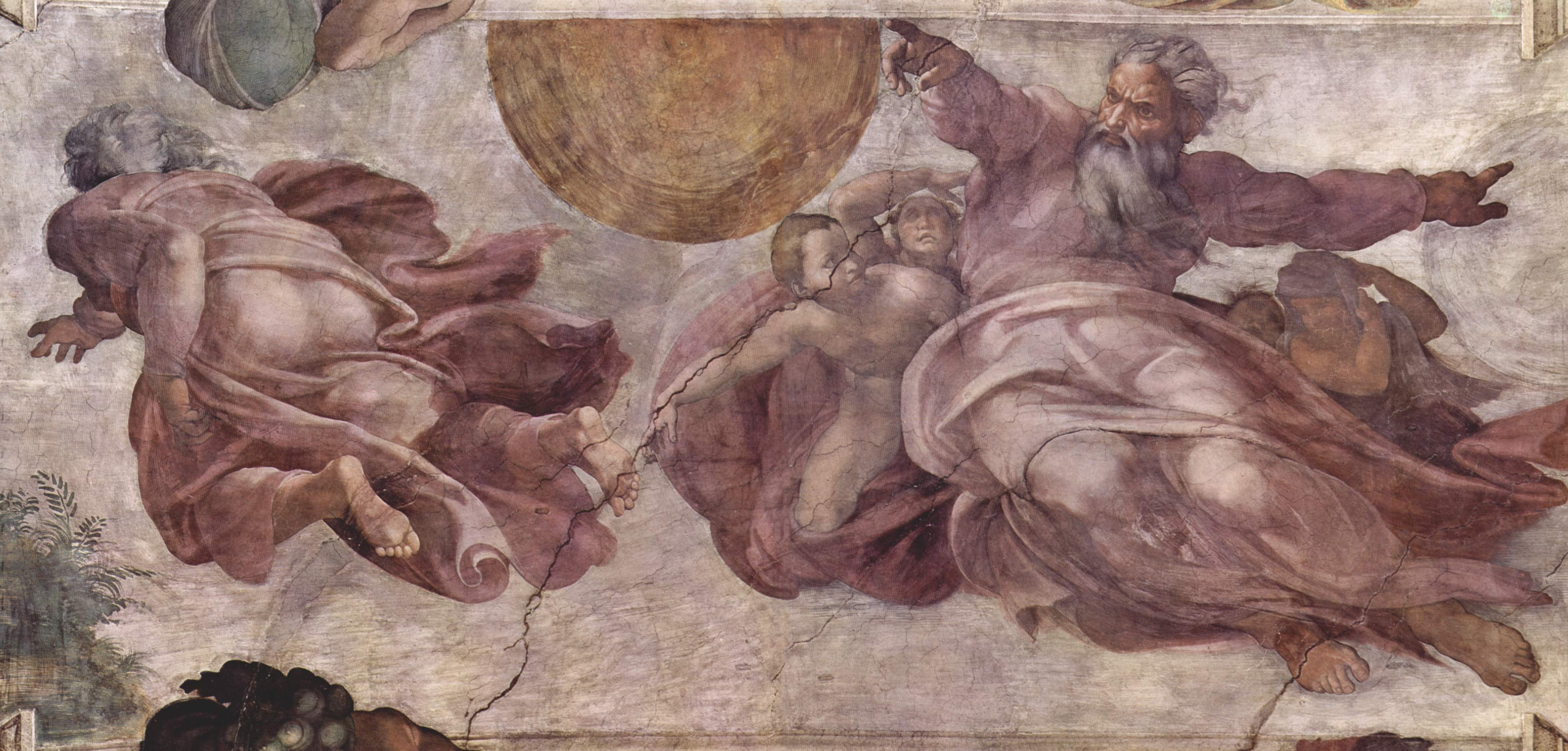
The Creation of the Sun, Moon, and Plants, ceiling fresco by Michelangelo, pre-restoration

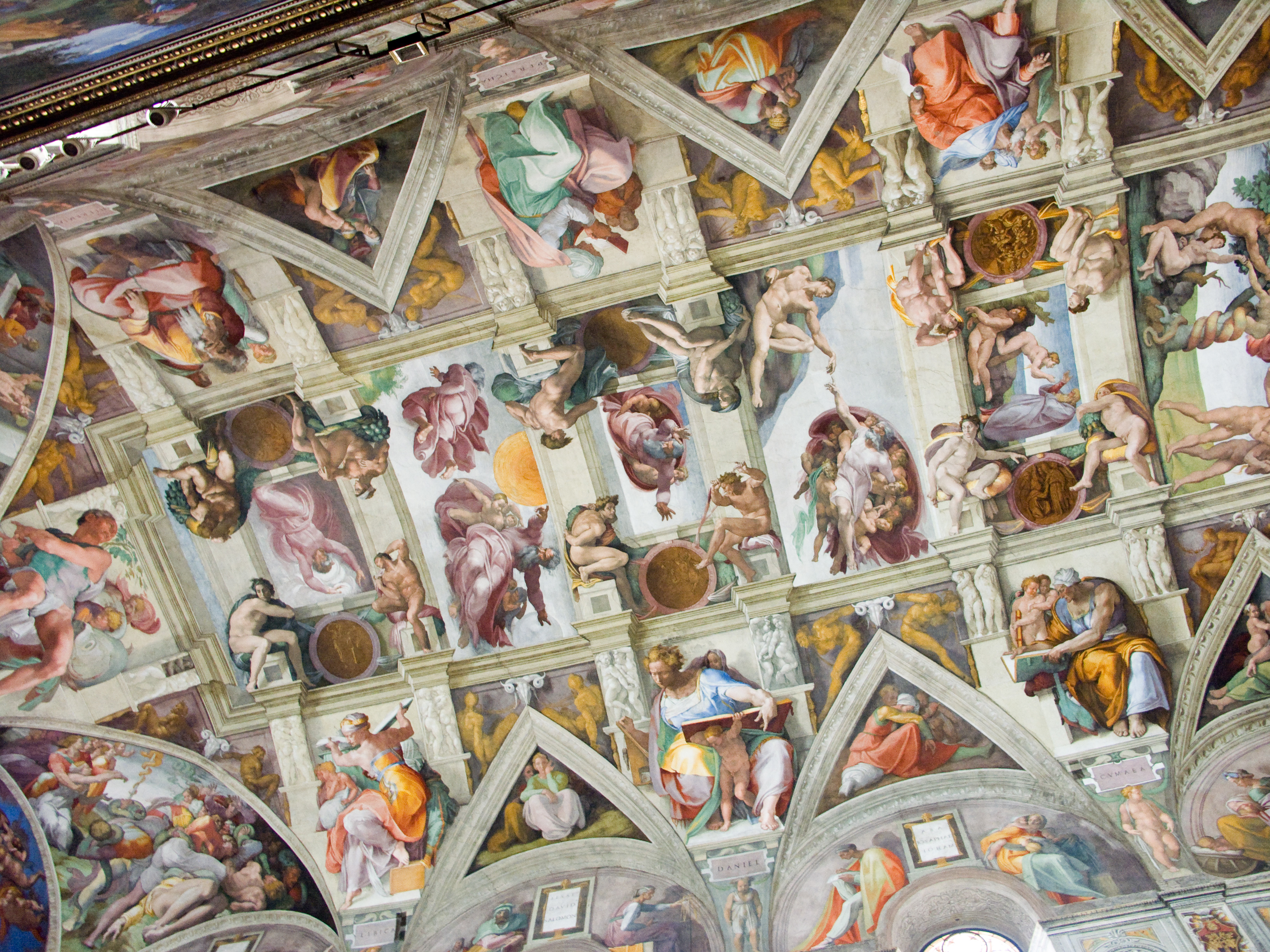
A post-restoration section of the ceiling of the Sistine Chapel that includes the fresco shown above

The conservation-restoration of the frescoes of the Sistine Chapel was one of the most significant conservation-restorations of the 20th century.

The Sistine Chapel was built by Pope Sixtus IV within the Vatican immediately to the north of St. Peter's Basilica and completed in about 1481. Its walls were decorated by a number of Renaissance painters who were among the most highly regarded artists of late 15th century Italy, including Ghirlandaio, Perugino, and Botticelli. The Chapel was further enhanced under Pope Julius II by the painting of the ceiling by Michelangelo between 1508 and 1512 and by the painting of the Last Judgment, commissioned by Pope Clement VII and completed in 1541, again by Michelangelo. The tapestries on the lowest tier, today best known from the Raphael Cartoons (painted designs) of 1515–16, completed the ensemble.

Together the paintings make up the greatest pictorial scheme of the Renaissance. Individually, some of Michelangelo's paintings on the ceiling are among the most notable works of Western art ever created. (Note: In particular, The Creation of Adam and The Fall of Man.) The frescoes of the Sistine Chapel and in particular the ceiling and accompanying lunettes by Michelangelo have been subject to a number of restorations, the most recent taking place between 1980 and 1994. This most recent restoration had a profound effect on art lovers and historians, as colours and details that had not been seen for centuries were revealed. It has been claimed that as a result "Every book on Michelangelo will have to be rewritten". Others, such as the art historian James Beck of ArtWatch International, have been extremely critical of the restoration, saying that the restorers have not realised the true intentions of the artist. This is the subject of continuing debate.

== Previous restorations ==
The frescoes on the ceiling of the Sistine Chapel had a number of interventions prior to the restoration process which was started in 1980. Initial problems with the ceiling appear to have been caused by water penetrating through the floor above. In about 1547 Paolo Giovio wrote that the ceiling was being damaged by saltpetre and cracks. The effect of saltpetre is to leave a white efflorescence. Gianluigi Colalucci, Head Restorer at the Laboratory for the Restoration of Paintings for Papal Monuments, Museums and Galleries, states in his essay Michelangelo's colours rediscovered, that the early conservators treated this cosmetically by an application of linseed or walnut oil which had the effect of making the crystalline deposit more transparent.

In 1625, a restoration was carried out by Simone Lagi, the "resident gilder", who wiped the ceiling with linen cloths and cleaned it by rubbing it with bread. He occasionally resorted to wetting the bread to remove the more stubborn accretions. His report states that the frescoes "were returned to their previous beauty without receiving any harm". Colalucci states that Lagi "almost certainly" applied layers of glue-varnish to revive the colours but does not state this in his report in the interests of "preserving the secrets of their [the restorers'] craft".

Between 1710 and 1713 a further restoration was carried out by the painter Annibale Mazzuoli and his son. They used sponges dipped in Greek wine which Colalucci suggests was necessitated by the accretion of grime caused by soot and dirt trapped in the oily deposits of the previous restoration. Mazzuoli then worked over the ceiling, according to Colalucci, strengthening the contrasts by overpainting details. They also repainted some areas the colours of which were lost because of the efflorescence of salts. Areas of repainting were hatched or treated with a linear brushstroke. (Note: The hatching of new paint on badly damaged painted surfaces is in line with modern restoration practice.) Colalucci states that Mazzuoli also applied a great deal of glue varnish. The restoration concentrated on the ceiling and less attention was paid to the lunettes.

The penultimate restoration was undertaken by the Restoration Laboratory of the Vatican Museum between 1935 and 1938. The scope of the work was to consolidate some areas of the intonaco at the eastern end of the building and partially remove the soot and dirt.

== Modern restoration ==
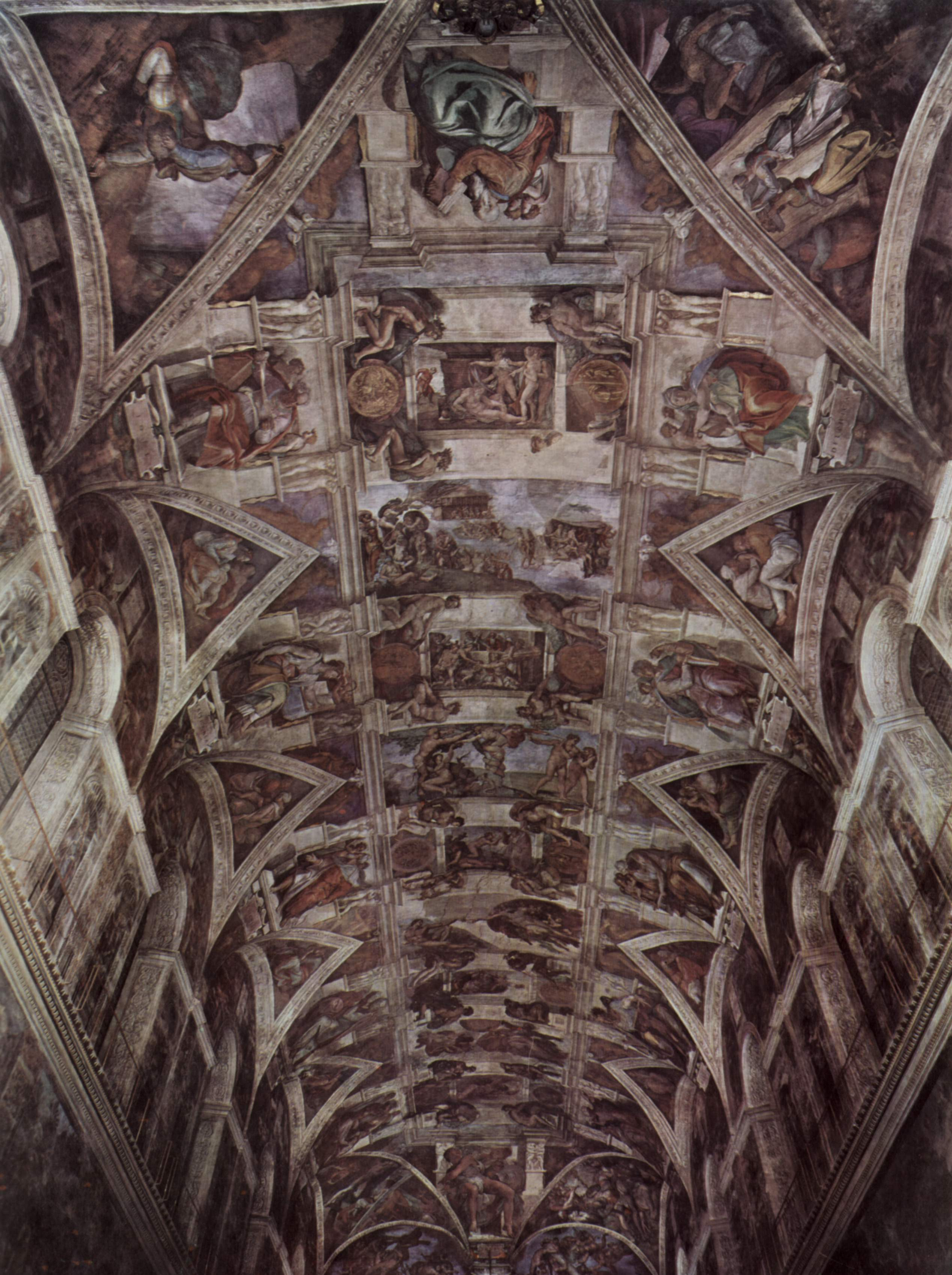
The ceiling before the restoration (Note: This photo is somewhat darker than the ceiling actually appeared.)

The preliminary experimentation for the modern restoration began in 1979. The restoration team comprised Gianluigi Colalucci, Maurizio Rossi, Piergiorgio Bonetti, and others, who took as their guidelines the Rules for restoration of works of art as established in 1978 by Carlo Pietrangeli, director of the Vatican's Laboratory for the Restoration of Pictures, which govern the procedure and methods employed in restoration. An important part of modern restoration procedure, as established by these rules, is the study and analysis of the artwork. Part of this was the recording of every stage of the restoration process. This was done by the photographer Takashi Okamura for Nippon Television Network Corporation.

Between June 1980 and October 1984 the first stage of restoration, the work upon Michelangelo's lunettes, was achieved. The focus of the work then transferred to the ceiling, which was completed in December 1989 and from there to the Last Judgment. The restoration was unveiled by Pope John Paul II on 8 April 1994. The final stage was the restoration of the wall frescoes, approved in 1994 and unveiled on 11 December 1999.

=== Aims of the conservators ===
The aims of the conservators were as follows:

- To study the frescoes progressively, to analyse any discoveries and utilise the appropriate technical responses.
- To record every step of the operation in archival reports, photographs and film.
- To use only those procedures and materials which were simple, extensively tested, not harmful, and reversible.
- To repair cracks and structural damage that threatened the stability of the plaster.
- To remove layers of grime consisting of candle wax and soot that had been deposited by the burning of candles in the chapel for 500 years.
- To remove repainting by previous restorers that attempted to counteract the effects of soot and other accretions.
- To remove oil and animal fat used to counteract salination of areas where water had leaked through.
- To remove crystalline accretions of salt that had whitened areas where water had leaked through.
- To conserve surfaces that were in danger of further deterioration because of bubbling, and flaking.
- To restore sympathetically those areas where deterioration of one sort or another had obliterated details and caused loss of integrity to the whole, for example, filling a bad crack and painting the plaster in a colour matching the original.
- To maintain in small defined areas a physical historical record of the previous restorations that had taken place.

=== Preparation and approach ===
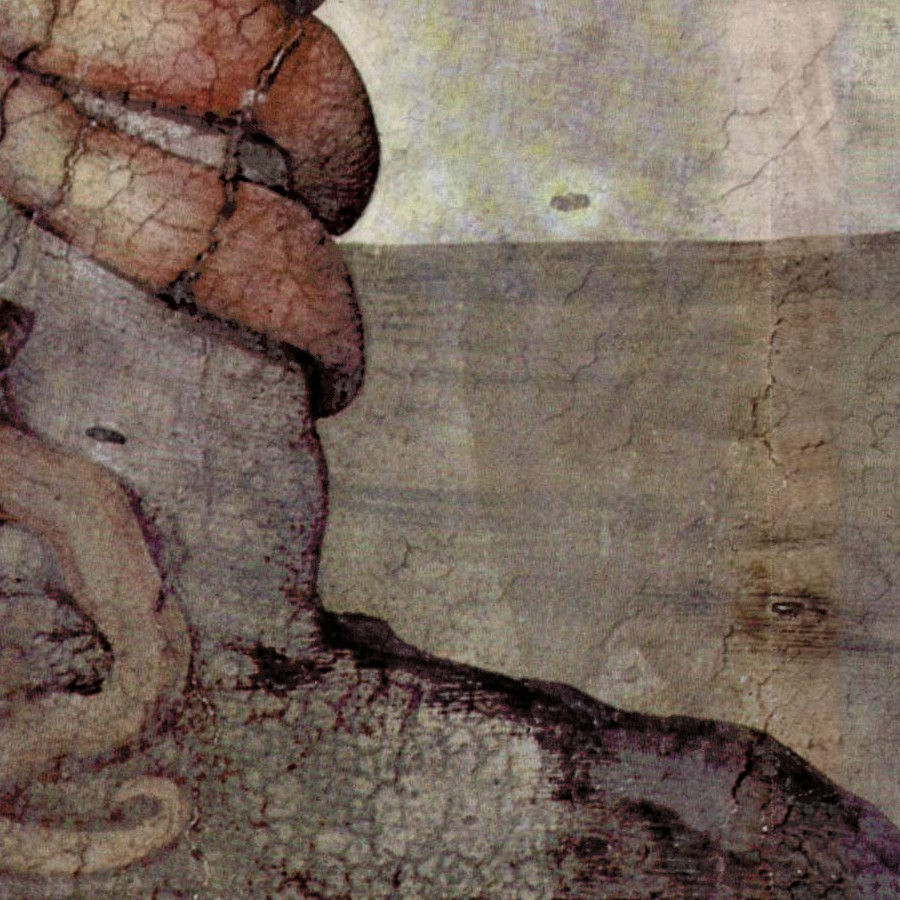
This detail of the Expulsion from Eden shows the darkening of the colours to a monochrome, cracking of the plaster, metal pins of a previous stabilisation, staining from water flow, salt deposits, darkening by saltpetre and overpainting.

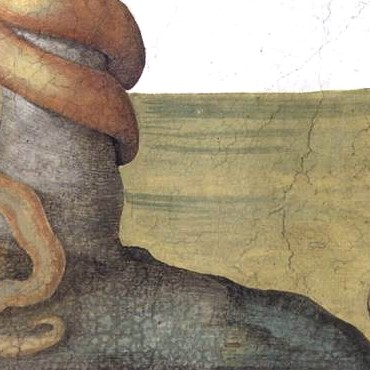
This detail of the same section shows the brightness of the colours after cleaning. The major cracks and metal pins have been filled and coloured to match adjacent areas. Smaller cracks are more visible, by contrast with the bright surface. The saltpetre rings are irreversible.

In 1979 Colalucci undertook a series of experiments to discover the right approach for the restoration of the frescoes of the Sistine Chapel. The investigation began by testing small areas of the wall fresco, Conflict over the Body of Moses by Matteo de Lecce, which had similar physical and chemical attributes to the painting techniques employed on Michelangelo's frescoes. Trials to find the right solvents were continued on a small portion of the Eleazar and Matthan lunette.

Because of the height of the ceiling and the inaccessibility of the ceiling frescoes, the precise nature of the damage and the problems that would be encountered by the restoration team could not be entirely foreseen until after the decision to restore was taken, and the scaffolding was in place. According to Colalucci, the continued scientific analysis and the response of the restorers to the particular problems was an ongoing part of the process, rather than the conservation team deciding on a single treatment for every part of the building.

In 1980, the decision to undertake a total restoration was taken. Nippon Television Network Corporation of Japan provided major funding of US$4.2 million in exchange for the exclusive reproduction rights.

=== Scaffold ===
The team of restorers completed the first stage of the restoration, on the vertical surfaces and curved spandrels around the upper sections of the windows, from aluminium scaffolding projecting from just below the lunettes and using the same holes in the wall that had been made for Michelangelo's scaffold. When they moved to the ceiling, they likewise employed a system similar to Michelangelo's, which involved cantilevering a shelf outwards from the scaffolding to support a stepped and arched platform. The advantages of modern lightweight materials meant that the platform could be wheeled, facilitating easy movement along the length of the building rather than dismantling and replacement, as Michelangelo had done in 1506.

=== State of the frescoes ===
The findings of the investigation of 1979 were that the entire interior of the chapel, but particularly the ceiling, was covered with a grime of candle smoke comprising wax and soot (amorphous carbon). Above the windows (the main source of ventilation), the lunettes were particularly stained from the smoke and exhaust fumes of the city, being "much dirtier than the ceiling proper". The building was a little unstable and had already shifted considerably prior to Michelangelo's work of 1508, causing cracking of the ceiling, the crack in the "Judith" pendentive being so large that it had to be filled with bricks and mortar before painting. The upper part of the ceiling provided Michelangelo an irregular surface due to cracks and water seepage.

Continued ingress of water from the roof and from unroofed exterior walkways above the ceiling level had caused seepage which carried down salts from the building mortar and deposited them on the ceiling through evaporation. In places, this caused the surface of the frescoes to bubble and lift. Although discolouration was a serious problem, bubbling was not, because the thinness and transparency of the paint which Michelangelo employed on the greater part of the ceiling permitted the salts to pass through rather than accumulating beneath the surface.

Earlier restorations had all left their marks on the frescoes. To counteract the whitening caused by salination, animal fat and vegetable oil had been applied, which effectively made the salt crystals transparent, but left a sticky layer that accumulated dirt. An additional problem, most obvious in the small putti which hold the nameplates on the pendentives, was saltpetre seeping through small cracks and appearing as dark rings on the surface. Unlike the white crystalline salt deposits, this could not be removed and the staining was irreversible. Layers of varnish and glue had been applied to many areas. This had darkened and become opaque. Restorers had repainted details over the darkened areas in order to define the features of figures. This was particularly the case for the lunettes, spandrels and lower parts of the pendentives.

Close examination revealed that apart from smoky deposits, seepage deposits and structural cracks, the thin "pictorial skin" of Michelangelo's frescoes was in excellent condition. Colalucci describes Michelangelo as having employed the best possible fresco techniques, as described by Vasari. Most of the paint was well adhered and required little retouching. The plaster, or intonaco, on which the paintings were executed was found, for the most part, to be secure, as previous restorers had fixed it in places with bronze pins.

=== Interventions ===
Prior to the restoration, the team spent six months investigating the composition and condition of the frescoes, questioning members of the team that had restored the frescoes in the 1930s and making a detailed scientific study to ascertain which solvents and methods were best employed upon particular painted surfaces.

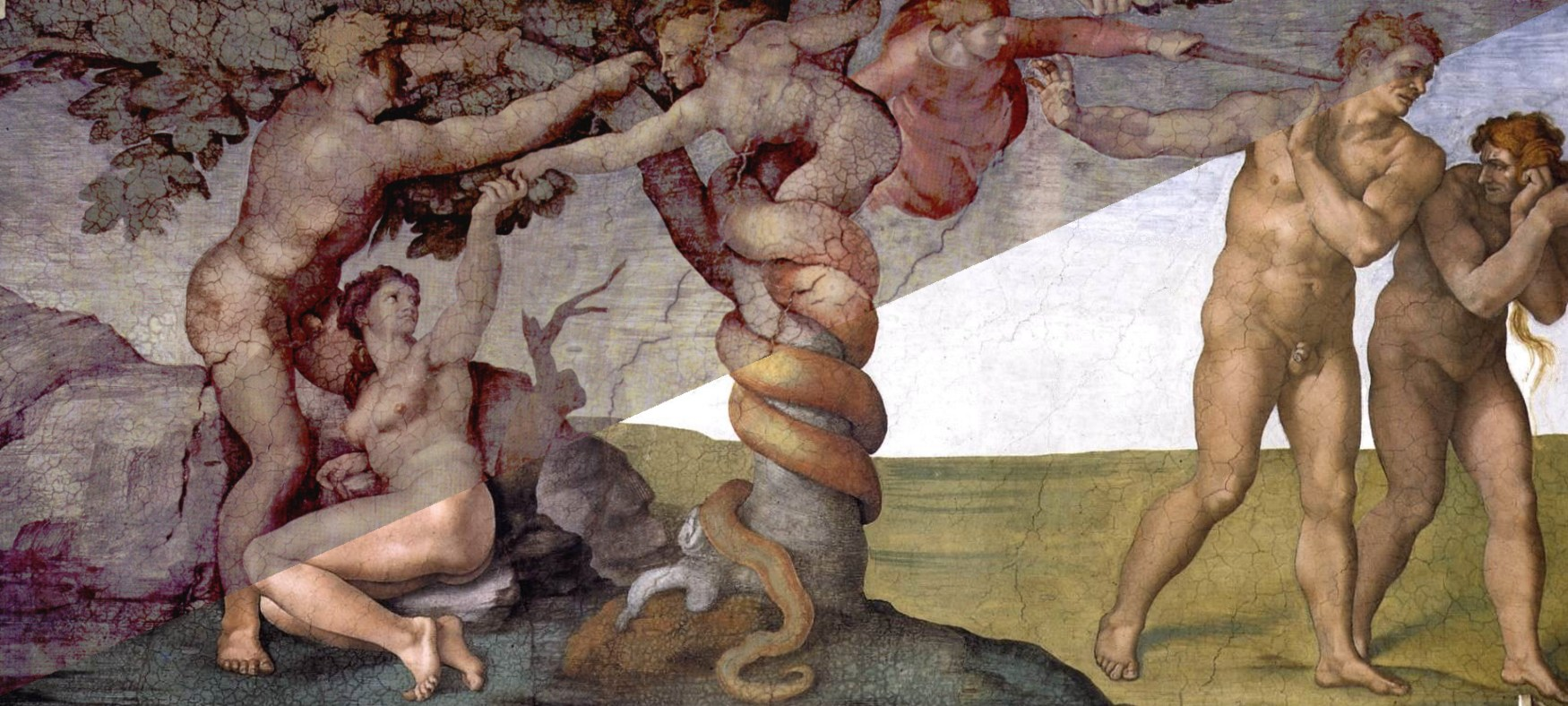
A composite image of The Fall and Expulsion of Adam and Eve by Michelangelo. The upper left is shown unrestored, the lower right is shown restored.

The first stage of the physical restoration was to re-attach any areas of the plaster surface (which was approximately 5 mm thick) that were in danger of separating and breaking away. This was done by injecting a polyvinylacetate resin. Earlier bronze braces that had been used to stabilise surfaces were removed in those places where they were causing cracking, and the holes filled. Pigments that appeared to be not well adhered were consolidated with the application of diluted acrylic resin.

The restorers washed the surfaces using a variety of solvents. Distilled water was used wherever possible to remove soot and dissolve water-soluble gums. Retouching and repainting that had been part of previous later restorations were removed with a gelatinous solvent, applied in several stages for measured times, and washed with distilled water. Salt efflorescences of calcium carbonate were treated by the application of a solution of dimethylformamide. The final step was the application of a weak solution of acrylic polymer to consolidate and protect the surface, and further washing.

Where necessary some areas were retouched in watercolour, to integrate the pictorial material. These areas are distinctively textured with vertical brushstrokes, not visible from a distance but easily discernible as restoration work when viewed close up.

Certain small areas were left unrestored, in order to maintain a physical record of the previous restorations that had taken place, for example, an area left with overpainting and candle wax, and another area demonstrating the attempt to counteract salination with oil.

== Environmental protection of the frescoes ==
Once the many layers of candle wax, varnish, and animal glue were removed from the surface of the Sistine Chapel frescoes, they became subject to dangers that could not have been predicted by previous restorers.

One of the major dangers to the frescoes is automotive exhaust, and they are also vulnerable to the effects of the crowds of tourists that pass through the chapel every day, bringing with them heat, humidity, dust and bacteria (the latter of which can biodegrade paints and pigments). The clean plaster surfaces are more in danger from these destructive elements than they were when they were covered with a layer of smoky wax.

Previously, the Sistine Chapel's only ventilation was from its windows in the upper level of the walls. To prevent exhaust fumes and wind-blown pollutants from entering, the windows are now permanently closed and an air conditioning system has been installed. The installation is by Carrier of the United Technologies Corporation and was developed with the cooperation of the Vatican's Office of Technical Services. It has been designed to counteract the various problems specific to the Chapel, in particular the rapid changes of heat and humidity that occur with the admission of the first crowds of tourists each morning and the departure of the last visitors each afternoon. The air conditioning varies not only the heat but also the relative humidity between the summer and winter months so that changes to the atmospheric environment occur gradually. The air near the ceiling is kept at a temperate level, while the air in the lower section of the building is cooler and circulates more rapidly, with the effect that dirt particles fall towards the floor rather than being streamed upwards. Bacteria and chemical pollutants are filtered out.

Environmental specifications:

- Air filtration units: remove particles down to 0.1 micrometre
- Air temperature: 20 °C (68 °F) in summer, moving gradually to 25 °C (77 °F) in winter.
- Relative humidity at ceiling: 55% ±5%.
- Sensors: 92, of which about half are for back-up purposes.
- Wiring: 26 km (85,000 ft)

== Response to the restoration ==
=== Criticism and praise ===
When the restoration of the Sistine Chapel was announced, it sparked a barrage of queries and objections from art historians around the world. One of the most vocal of these critics was James Beck, of ArtWatch International, who issued repeated warnings about the possibility of damage to Michelangelo's work from over-strenuous restoration. An argument that was used repeatedly was that all the previous interventions had caused damage of one sort or another. Any restoration, as opposed to conservation, puts an artwork at risk. Conservation, on the other hand, aids in the preservation of the work in its present state and in the prevention of further deterioration. Beck has written about his concerns in Art Restoration, the Culture, the Business and the Scandal.

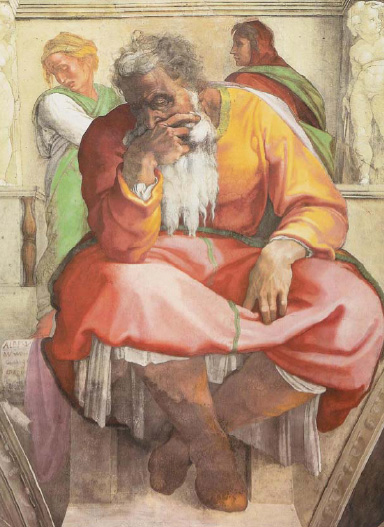
Jeremiah lamenting the destruction of Jerusalem

In the rhetoric of this conversation, [the conservators] say that the previous restoration was no good – now we're going to make a really good one. It's like having a facelift. How many times can people go through one without their poor faces looking like an orange peel?

— James Beck

While James Beck became "embroiled in a public debate" with Gianluigi Colalucci, Ronald Feldman, a New York art dealer, started a petition supported by 15 well-known artists including Robert Motherwell, George Segal, Robert Rauschenberg, Christo and Andy Warhol asking Pope John Paul II to call a halt to the procedure and also the restoration of Leonardo da Vinci's Last Supper.

An undertaking of the restoration team was that everything would be handled in a transparent fashion, that reporters, art historians and others with a bona fide interest should have ready access to information and to view the work. However, a single company, Nippon Television Network Corporation, had sole photography rights. Michael Kimmelman, chief art critic of The New York Times, wrote, in 1991, that the criticism of the restoration of the ceiling and lunettes was in part fuelled by the Nippon Television Network's reluctance to make public those photographs that they had taken by exclusive right, which had recorded every stage of the process and which were the only solid evidence that the work was being done appropriately.

According to Kimmelman, the reason for their reluctance to produce the detailed photos, which could have put to rest the worst fears of many of the interested parties, was the intention of the company to produce a large limited-edition two-volume coffee-table book ("as large as a coffee table"). This book, when produced retailed for US$1,000. Kimmelman refers to the fact that these photos were only made available to the few who could afford the exorbitant price as "ungenerous" and "immoral".

As the work was progressively completed, there were those who were delighted; Pope John Paul II spoke an inaugural homily after each stage. In December 1999, after the completion of the wall frescoes, he said:

It would be difficult to find a more eloquent visual commentary on this biblical image than the Sistine Chapel, whose full splendour we can enjoy today thanks to the recently completed restoration. Our joy is shared by the faithful throughout the world, who not only cherish this place because of the masterpieces it contains, but also for the role it plays in the Church's life.

— Pope John Paul II

Cardinal Edmund Szoka, governor of Vatican City, said: "This restoration and the expertise of the restorers allows us to contemplate the paintings as if we had been given the chance of being present when they were first shown."

Other writers were less flattering. Andrew Wordsworth of The Independent, London, expressed the major point of concern:

There seems little doubt that the ceiling of the Sistine Chapel was in part painted a secco (that is, once the plaster was dry), but the restorers none the less decided that radical cleaning was necessary, given the amount of dirt that had accumulated (in particular from candle smoke). As a result the ceiling now has a curiously washed-out look, with pretty but flavourless colouring – an effect quite unlike that of Michelangelo's intensely sensual sculpture.

— Andrew Wordsworth

This crucial matter was also emphasised by Beck and defined in very clearly expressed terms on the website of the artist Peter Layne Arguimbau.

=== Issues raised by critics ===
That part of the restoration in the Sistine Chapel which has caused the most concern is the ceiling, painted by Michelangelo. The emergence of the brightly coloured Ancestors of Christ from the gloom sparked a reaction of fear that the processes being employed in the cleaning were too severe. Despite warnings, the work on the ceiling proceeded and, according to critics such as James Beck, their worst fears were confirmed once the ceiling was completed.

The cause for dissent lies in the analysis and understanding of the techniques utilised by Michelangelo, and the technical response of the restorers to their understanding of those techniques. A close examination of the frescoes of the lunettes convinced the restorers that Michelangelo worked exclusively in "buon fresco"; that is, the artist worked only on freshly laid plaster and each section of work was completed while the plaster was still in its fresh state. In other words, they believed Michelangelo did not work "a secco"; he did not come back later and add details onto the dry plaster.

The restorers, by assuming that the artist took a universal approach to the painting, took a universal approach to the restoration. A decision was made that all of the shadowy layer of animal glue and "lamp black", all of the wax, and all of the overpainted areas were contamination of one sort or another: smoke deposits, earlier restoration attempts and painted definition by later restorers in attempt to enliven the appearance of the work. Based on this decision, according to Arguimbau's critical reading of the restoration data that has been provided, the chemists of the restoration team decided upon a solvent that would effectively strip the ceiling down to its paint-impregnated plaster. After treatment, only that which was painted "buon fresco" would remain.

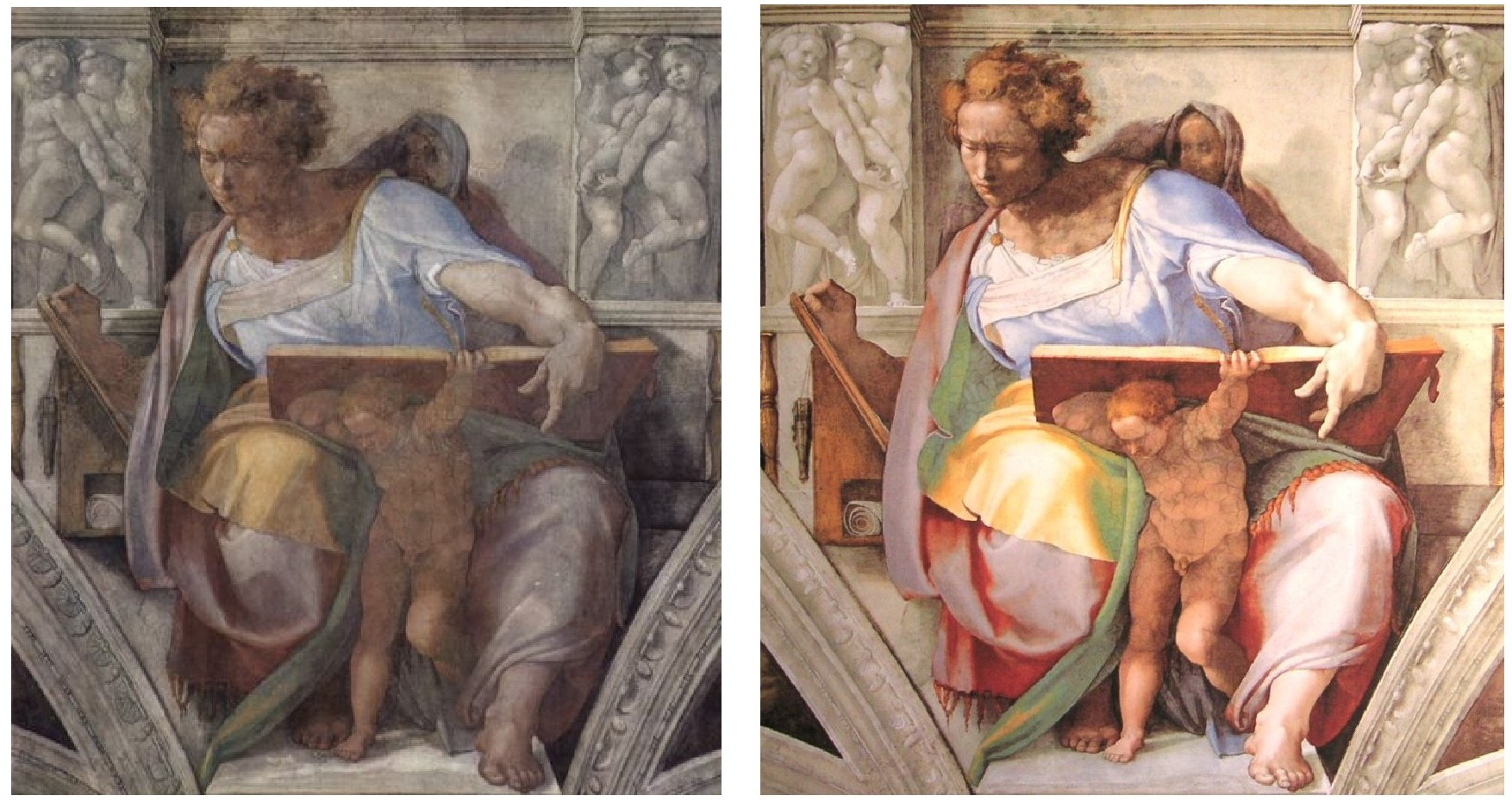
Daniel, before and after restoration

According to critics, the inherent problem with this approach is that it relied heavily upon an assumption that Michelangelo only painted buon fresco, that he was always satisfied with the result at the end of the day, and that in four and a half years spent on the ceiling, he stuck exclusively to one approach, and never made small alterations or added details. Arguimbau, on his website, quotes Colalucci, the head of the team, as contradicting himself on this matter.

A summary of the relevant statements of Colalucci, in the order that they occur in the Appendix entitled Michelangelo's colours uncovered is as follows:

The elderly restorers who had taken part in the restoration of the 1930s were interviewed as part of the preparatory process. They claimed that Michelangelo worked over the frescoes a secco using velature or glazes as a binder. Colalucci rejects this, stating that Michelangelo worked exclusively in buon fresco. Colalucci then contradicts this by stating that Michelangelo had worked a secco, but "to a minimal degree" and "not at all in the lunettes". Colalucci then talks of Michelangelo's "rigorous maintenance" of buon fresco technique, contradicting this by describing the a secco retouchings that Michelangelo made to the shoulder of Eleazar and the foot of Reboam, both of which are in the lunettes. He then says that Michelangelo worked in buon fresco with "no pentimenti proper", (pentimenti means the changes) but only small corrections in fresco.

The ongoing criticism has been that the restorers presumed to know what end result the master was seeking to achieve in every separate case across the ceiling, and by what method he sought to achieve it. The disagreements about this have been vociferous and are unresolved.

==== Carbon black problem ====
The restorers took for granted that all of the layers of grease and soot on the ceiling were the result of candle smoke. Contrary to this view, James Beck and numerous artists have suggested that Michelangelo used carbon black in a wash of glue to lay on shadows and crisp dark definition, a secco. If this is the case, then the greater part was removed in the restoration.

On some of the figures, however, there still remains clear evidence of painting in carbon black. The apparent explanation for this is that over the long period that Michelangelo was at work, he probably, for a variety of reasons, varied his technique. Things that might affect the degree of finish achieved on a particular giornata include the heat and humidity of the day and the length of daylight hours. Whatever the reason for the difference is, a difference in approach to the light and shade on the individual figures is clearly apparent.

There are still intense areas of shadow which throw the Cumaean Sibyl into relief. But it is more than relief; it is the three-dimensionality which art-lovers expect to see in the work of the man who sculpted Moses. Critics of the restoration claim that this was Michelangelo's aim and that many frescoes had brightly contrasting colours laid side-by-side that were then worked over a secco to achieve this effect and that this is what has been lost by a too-scrupulous cleaning.

Consistently missing from the restored ceiling is the crisp a secco detailing of the architecture: the scallop shells, acorns and "bead and reel" ornament which Michelangelo possibly would have left for completion by an assistant, when he moved on to the next panel. The treatment of these details varied considerably. In a few places, around the Ezekias spandrel, for example, the architectural detailing was painted buon fresco and remains intact.

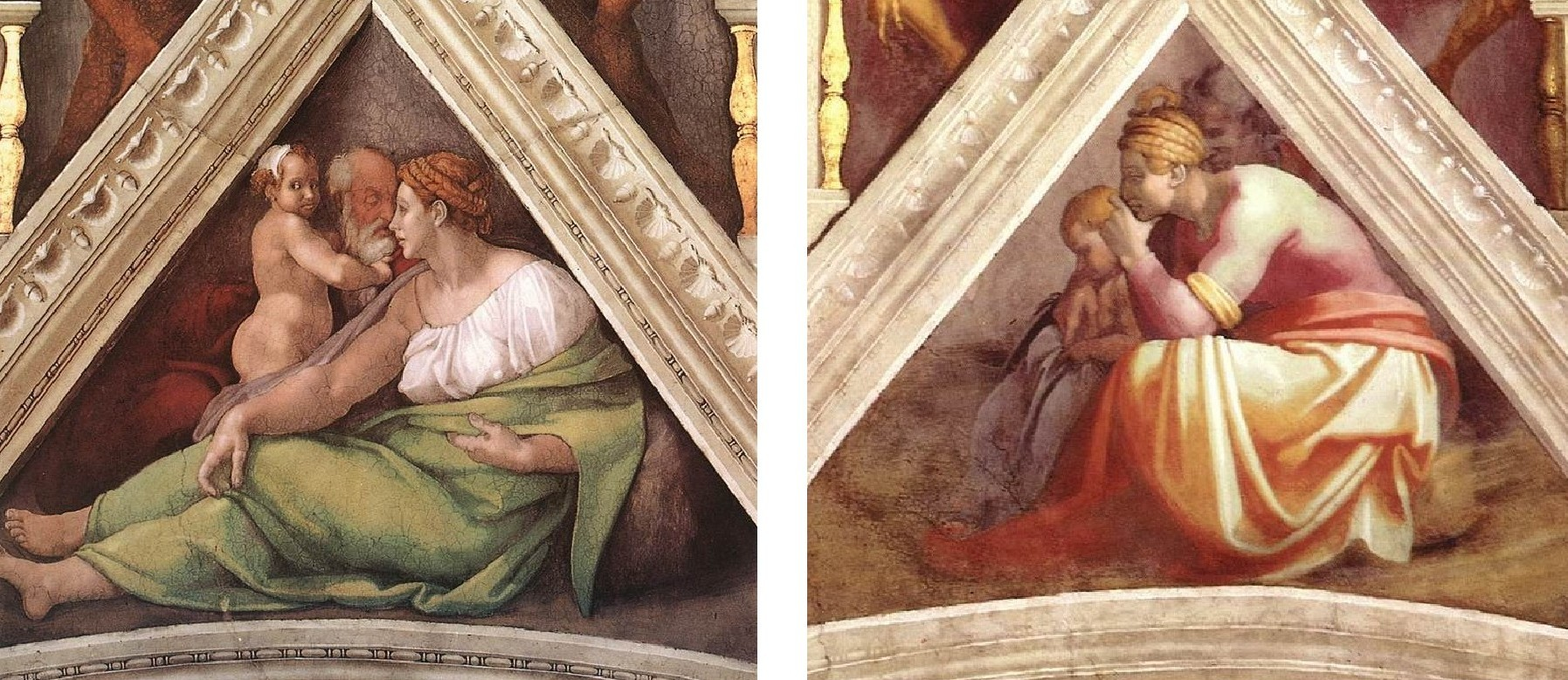
Different post-restoration states in two similar spandrels. In the left spandrel, black detailing of robes, eyes and architecture is intact. In the right spandrel, these details have been lost in the cleaning.

A comparison of two spandrels reveals different post-restoration states. The one on the left has shadows and details defined in black. The green robe with yellow highlights has been washed with black and defined with deep shadow. On the trompe-l'œil architecture, each motif is picked out in black. The eyes of the child are detailed in black and white. The continued presence of these details suggests that they were completed while the plaster was damp. The entire right spandrel has an unfinished look. Before cleaning it also had black defining the shadows of the robes and crisp detailing on the architecture.

On the corner pendentives, each of which depicts a violent subject, the removal of the carbon black has diminished the dramatic intensity of all four scenes. This is particularly noticeable in the loss of depth in the Punishment of Haman. Where once the figure projected starkly against the darkly shadowed interior, now foreshortening, definition and drama is lost in the pastel monotone that remains.

==== Colour ====
The curator, Fabrizio Mancinelli, quotes the 18th-century French traveller De Lalande in saying that the colouring of the ceiling was, by that time, monotonous, "tend[ing] towards dull red and grey". Mancinelli writes that the restoration reveals "a new Michelangelo" as a colourist and that this "new character makes much better sense of his historical position". He goes on to say that perceptive viewers of the Sistine Chapel ceiling have always been aware that the range of colours used was very different from that which could be seen, and included the same pinks, apple greens, oranges, yellows and pale blues that were employed by Michelangelo's teacher, Domenico Ghirlandaio, one of the most competent fresco painters of the Renaissance.

The brilliant palette ought to have been expected by the restorers as the same range of colours appears in the works of Giotto, Masaccio and Masolino, Fra Angelico and Piero della Francesca, as well as Ghirlandaio himself and later fresco painters such as Annibale Carracci and Tiepolo. The reason for employing this range of colours is that many other pigments are not usable in fresco as they have chemical properties that react badly in interaction with wet plaster. The colour that is noticeably missing from Michelangelo's ceiling, but not The Last Judgment, is the intense blue of lapis lazuli. This colour, achieved by grinding semi-precious stone, was always applied as a secondary, a secco stage, along with the gold leaf applied as haloes and decoration to robes. (Note: According to Vasari, Michelangelo planned to work over the ceiling with ultramarine (lapis lazuli) and gold, but never got around to re-erecting the scaffold. When reminded by the Pope that this had not been done, Michelangelo replied that the persons depicted on the ceiling were never wealthy.)

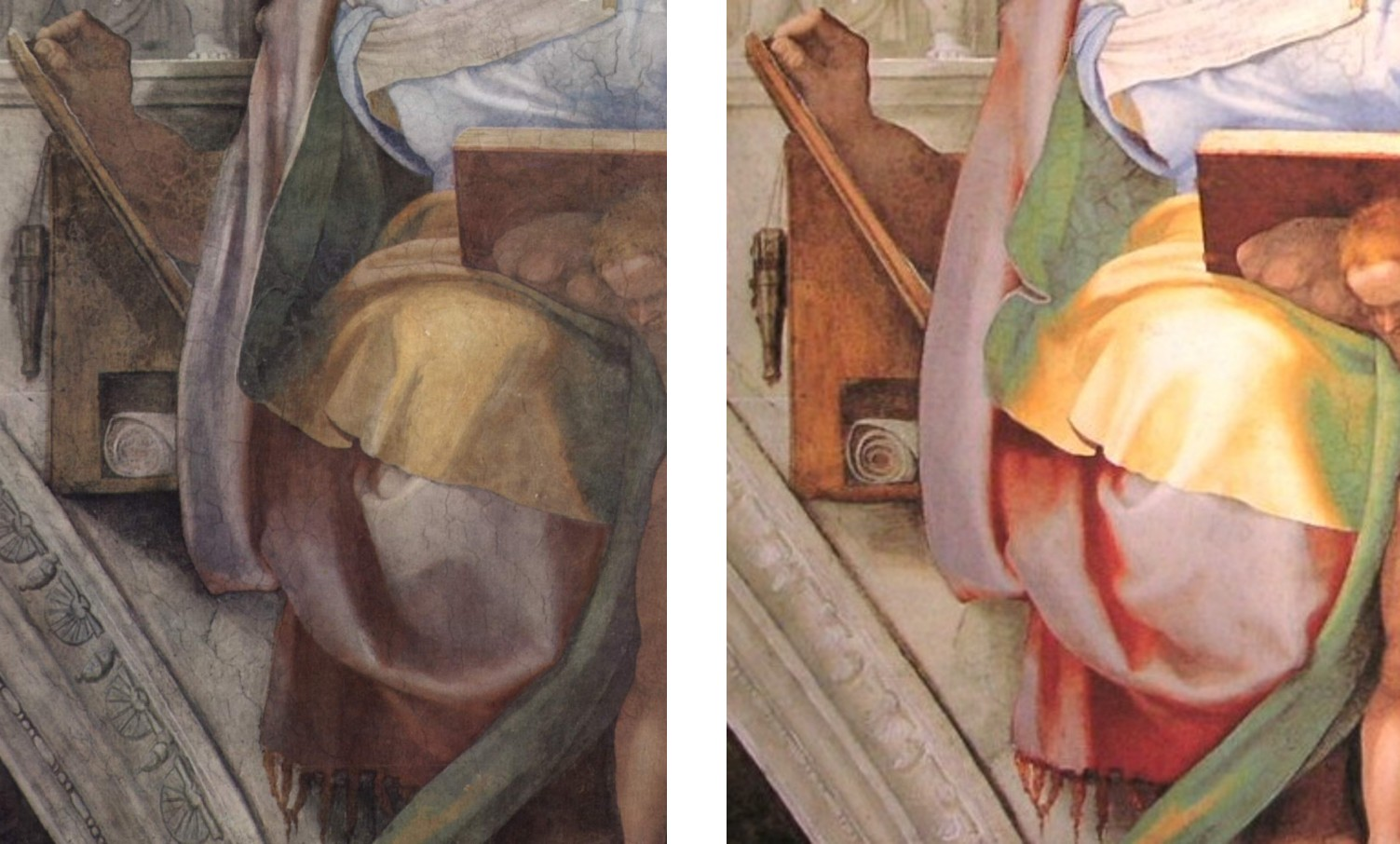
Daniel's right hand and knee. On the unrestored fresco, the intense red underpainting shows through the black a secco wash adding luminescence to the shadows. The form under the garment is achieved by the black wash. (Note: Two marked changes, or pentimenti, had been made to Daniel's robe, and are visible in the unrestored state: the sharp little horizontal fold in the edge of the green robe had been painted out a secco, and a new straight edge carefully touched with light to continue the line. The narrow band of purple robe had also been reworked a secco to a more elaborate form. These subtleties are all missing from the restored fresco. These and many other such changes are among those noted by critics of the restoration such as Beck.)

The aspect of the colouring which was most unexpected was Michelangelo's treatment of shadows. The painting of the Libyan Sibyl and the Prophet Daniel, which are side-by-side, are exemplary. On the yellow dress of the Sibyl, Michelangelo has bright yellow highlights, passing through carefully graded tones of deeper yellow to pale orange, darker orange and almost to red in the shadows. While red shadows are of themselves unusual in a fresco, the gradation through adjacent parts of the spectrum is a natural enough solution. On Daniel's robes, there is no such gentle gradation. The yellow lining of his cloak becomes a sudden dense green in the shadows, while the mauve has shadows that are intensely red. These colour combinations, which are best described as iridescent, can be found at various places on the ceiling, including the hose of the young man in the Mathan lunette which is pale green and reddish purple.

In some instances, the colour combinations look garish: this is particularly the case with the Prophet Daniel. A comparison of the "restored" and "unrestored" figure gives strong evidence that Michelangelo worked over this figure in a wash of carbon black, and that the technique was preplanned. The bright red used on the robes of Daniel and the Libyan Sibyl does not, on its own, create effective shadows. In these and many other cases it appears to have been intended as underpainting, to be seen only through a thin black wash and with the deepest shadows picked out in more intense black, as they still are on the Cumaean Sibyl. This use of bright, contrasting colours as underpainting is not a common feature of frescoes, but it is commonly employed in both oil painting and tempera. Like Daniel, the Libyan Sibyl's yellow garment once had much more subtlety in its folds and shadows than it has now. (Note: The use of red or sepia underpainting in frescoes was not unknown. It was commonly used where the cloak of Jesus or the Virgin Mary had an a secco application of lapis lazuli to achieve a brilliant blue. See Giotto's frescoes of the Nativity and the Raising of Lazarus at the Scrovegni Chapel.)

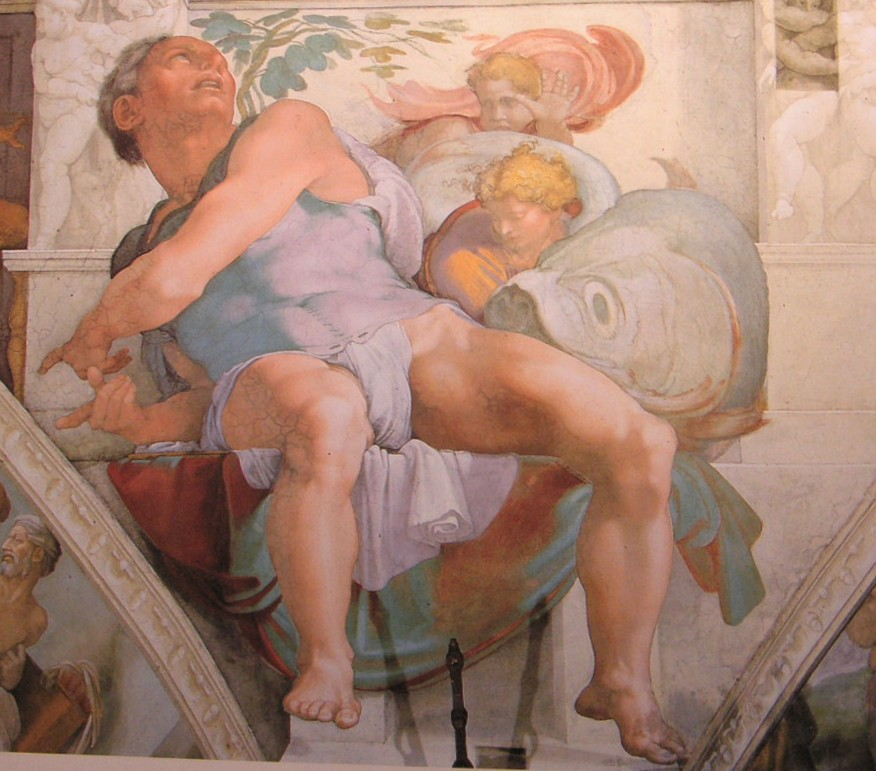
Jonah, restored. Much of the dramatic tonality of the figure has disappeared in the cleaning, diminishing the effect of the foreshortening.

There is absolutely no doubt that before the restoration, the whole ceiling was dirtier, more muted and more monochrome than Michelangelo ever intended, but when images of the frescoes are viewed in their stained and unrestored state the subtle washes and intense definitions, described by Beck and Arguimbau, still make their presence known, giving mass and bulk to the forms.

The painter and biographer Giorgio Vasari, in his Lives of the Artists, describes the figure of Jonah as it appeared in the mid-16th century:

Then who is not filled with admiration and amazement at the awesome sight of Jonah, the last figure in the chapel? The vaulting naturally springs forward, following the curve of the masonry; but through the force of art it is apparently straightened out by the figure of Jonah, which bends in the opposite direction; and thus vanquished by the art of design, with its lights and shades, the ceiling even appears to recede.

The large figure of Jonah is of great significance to the total composition, both pictorially and theologically, being symbolic of the Risen Christ. The figure occupies the pendentive which rises from the altar wall to support the vault, and strains backward, his eyes turned towards God. The foreshortening described by Vasari was innovative and highly influential to later painters. The cleaning of this significant figure has left a few remnants of black shadow visible to the extreme left side of the painting. All the other, less intense, black lines and washes have been removed, lessening the impact of the radical foreshortening, and also robbing the great fish, the genii behind Jonah, and the architectural figures of much detail.

==== Eyes ====
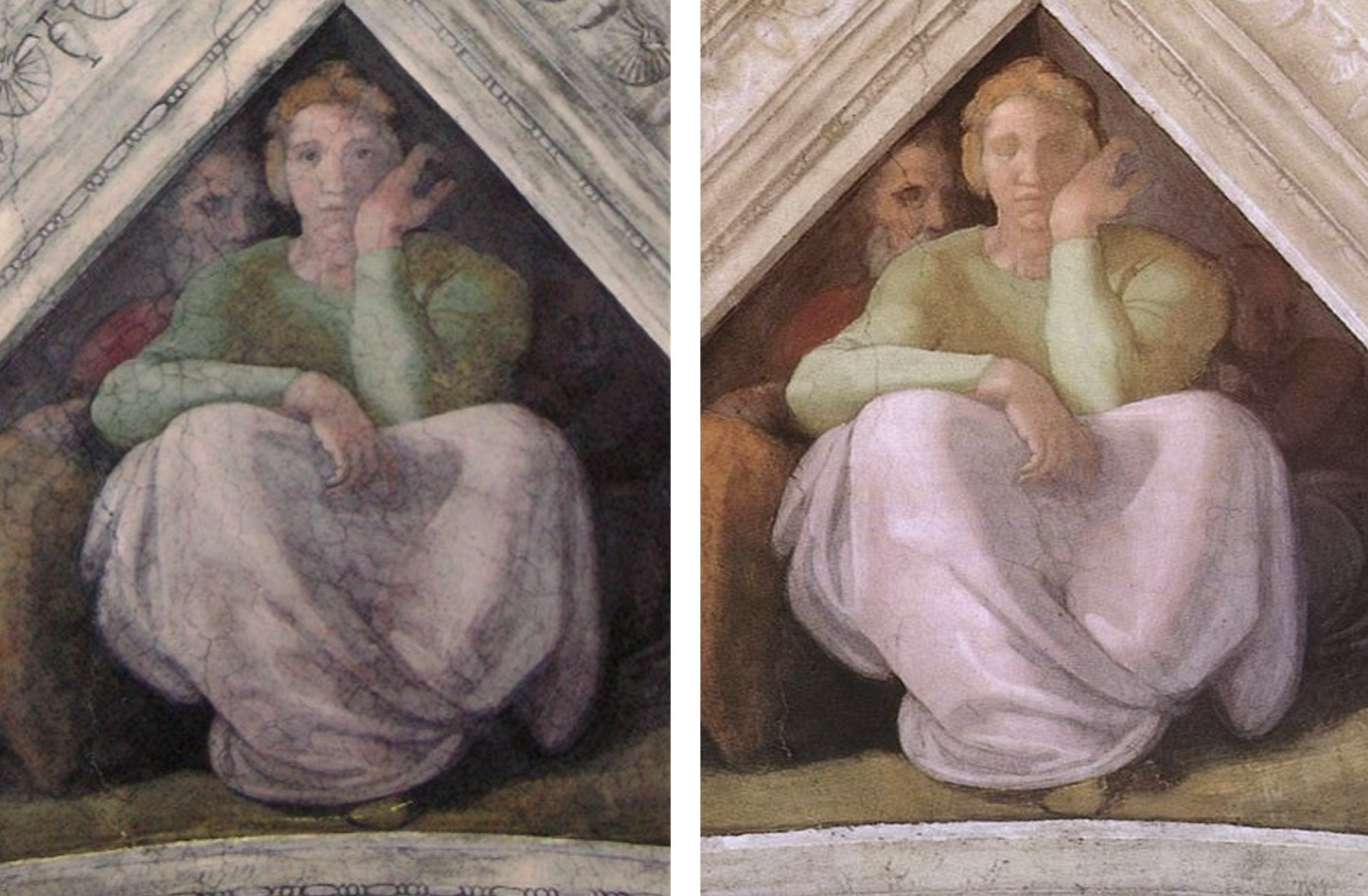
Losses of a sort which are deemed "travesties" by critics of the restoration. The Jesse spandrel, before and after restoration. The eyes are now missing, as they are in numerous other figures, particularly among the ancestors.

The missing depth is not the only factor that critics deplore. An important feature of Michelangelo's work that has disappeared in many places is the painting of eyeballs. Eyes appear in many instances to have been painted buon fresco. Wherever they have not been painted buon fresco but added a secco, they have been removed by the restorers.

The eyes are an essential part of the most famous of the frescoes, The Creation of Adam. Adam gazes at God. God looks directly at Adam. Under God's protective arm, Eve turns her eyes sideways to look at her husband-to-be. Michelangelo repeatedly painted expressive gazes on the faces of his characters. The eye sockets of the family in the Zerubbabel lunette are empty, as are the eyes of the man in the Amminadab lunette. The removal that has caused the most distress to critics is the eyes of the little figure in green and white who once looked out of the gloom above the lunette of Jesse.

Arguimbau says:

Have you ever felt that some things never fade and remain an inspiration for all time? That was the Sistine Chapel, now chemically stripped down of divine inspiration and looking shockingly out of place. ... It is the duty of the restorer not to alter the intent of the artist, but the scientist cannot help himself. Who cares if Colalucci discovered Michelangelo as a colorist and can explain the Colorist trends of Pontormo and Rossi. His job is to make sure the thing is stuck on there and leave it alone. In comparing before and after photos there is much proof that Colalucci removed 'a secco' passages and left many areas sketchy and thin and. [sic] Proof of one single change of the artist's intent is negligence of which there are many.

— Arguimbau

Richard Serrin, in an essay entitled Lies and Misdemeanors: Gianluigi Colalucci's Sistine Chapel Revisited says:

The [so-called] Glorious Restoration of Michelangelo's frescoes has destroyed them forever. What we say now cannot bring them back to life. We can only speak out to document the accountability of the Vatican restorers so that it does not pass unrecognized.

— Richard Serrin

== Restoring the light ==
Carlo Pietrangeli, former Director General of the Vatican Museums, writes of the restoration: "It is like opening a window in a dark room and seeing it flooded with light." His words resonate with those of Giorgio Vasari who, in the 16th century, said of the Sistine Chapel ceiling:

There is no other work to compare with this for excellence ... The ceiling has proved a veritable beacon for our art, of inestimable benefit to all painters, restoring light to a world that for centuries had been plunged into darkness.

Pietrangeli, in his foreword to The Sistine Chapel, written after the restoration of the lunettes, but prior to the restoration of the ceiling, commends those who had the courage to commence the restoration process, and thanks not only those who visited the restoration while it was in progress and gave the benefit of their knowledge and experience, but also those who were critical of the enterprise. Pietrangeli made acknowledgement that these people spurred the team on to punctilious documentation so that a full report of criteria and methods should be available to those who are interested, both in the present and the future.

== See also ==
- Index of Vatican City-related articles
- List of works by Michelangelo
