= Madonna of the Pinks =

Painting by Raphael

The Madonna of the Pinks
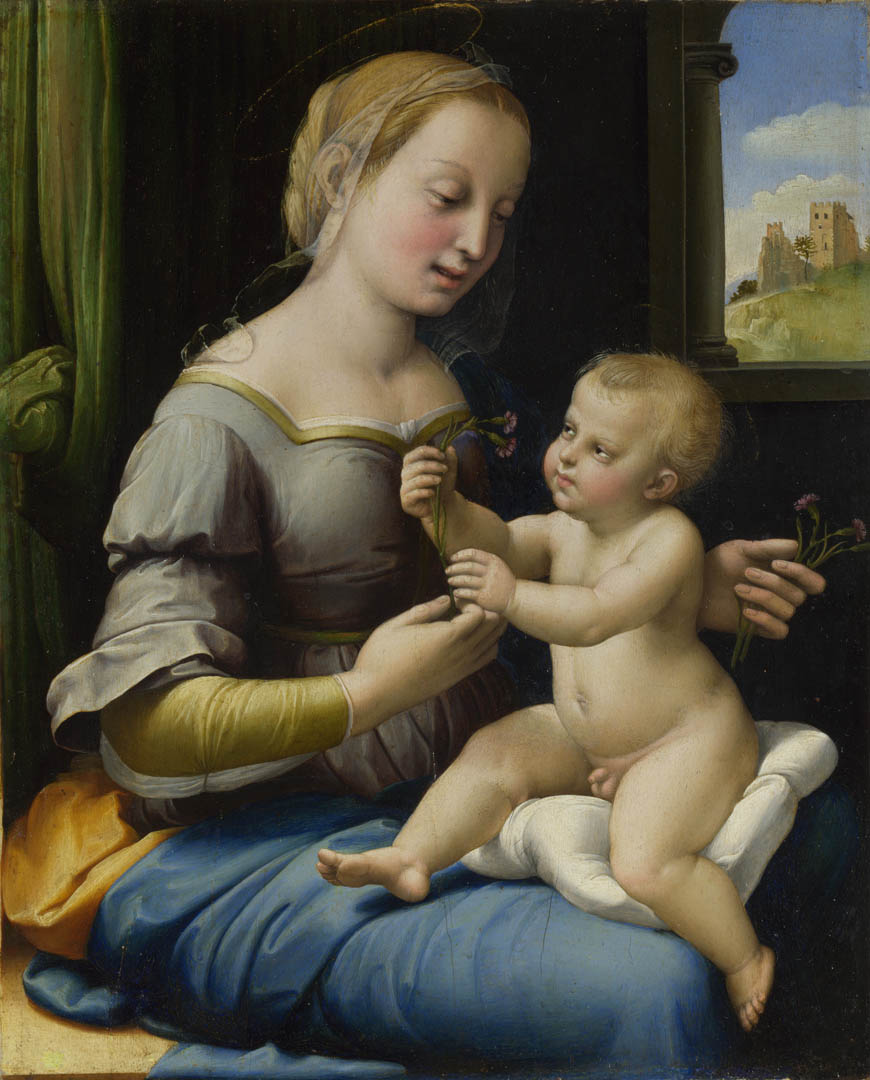
- Artist: Raphael
- Year: c. 1505-1506
- Type: oil on yew
- Dimensions: 27.9 cm × 22.4 cm (11.0 in × 8.8 in)
- Location: National Gallery London

The Madonna of the Pinks (c. 1505 – 1506, Italian: La Madonna dei garofani) is an early devotional painting usually attributed to Italian Renaissance master Raphael. It is painted in oils on yew [Taxus baccata] wood, a first for a Raphael or any currently known Italian Renaissance painting, and now hangs in the National Gallery in London.

== Subject matter ==
The painting depicts a youthful Virgin Mary handing the Christ Child carnations symbolising his future fate. (The Italian title, La Madonna dei garofani actually means The Madonna of the Carnation.) These flowers, whose botanical name is dianthus (Greek for ‘flower of God’), are a premonition of Christ's Passion – according to Christian legend the flower first appeared when the Virgin wept at the Crucifixion. The event takes place in a well-lit noble setting influenced by the Benois Madonna by Leonardo da Vinci. A grand room, probably in a castle, opens to an alcoven with a column and the tower of a small fortification outside. While Leonardo made this very clear through two well-lit steps in the distance, in the London painting the grandeur is lost in darkness, leading many viewers to presume a tiny little window high above the child's head with a micro-column, both architectural elements not in existence around 1505. The colour scheme of blues and greens that link the Virgin with the landscape is Raphael's own. Through the arched window, we see a mountaintop with a ruin, possibly alluding to the Fortezza Albornoz to the west of the Palazzo Ducale in Urbino which was reduced by French soldiers in 1789 but was very much in use at the time the painting was created.

== Provenance ==
The subject matter and size of the painting, little larger than a Book of Hours, might suggest that it may have been intended as a portable aid to prayer. Although Raphael almost exclusively worked for the Ducal family of the Feltri/Roveri in his hometown Urbino in these years the identity of its original patron is currently officially supposed unknown, although a probably forged inventory from the 1850s suggests that it was commissioned for a (probably non-existing) Maddalena degli Oddi, supposedly a member of a prominent Perugian family, after she had taken holy orders. In the 19th century it was the property of Roman painter Vincenzo Camuccini, supposedly bought by his brother, the infamous art dealer and serial forger Pietro under highly dubious circumstances from the Barberini in 1813.

=== Attribution to Raphael ===
Only in 1991 was the painting identified as a genuine Raphael, by the Renaissance scholar Nicholas Penny. Although Raphael scholars were aware of the existence of the work, which had hung in Alnwick Castle since 1853, they considered it merely the best of several copies of a lost original. After a major public appeal the Madonna of the Pinks was bought in 2004 by the National Gallery from the Duke of Northumberland for £34.88 million, with contributions from the Heritage Lottery Fund and the National Art Collections Fund. To justify the expenditure it went on a nationwide tour to Manchester, Cardiff, Edinburgh and Barnard Castle.

An early critic of the attribution of the National Gallery's painting Madonna of the Pinks to Raphael was James Beck, who set out his arguments in a series of articles published in the popular press, in various scholarly journals, and more extensively in a posthumous publication From Duccio to Raphael: Connoisseurship in Crisis (2007). Brian Sewell notably criticised the painting for being of low quality and possibly forged, pointing out how the Madonna's right leg seems disconnected from her body. Columbia-Professor Beck identified the Roman painter known as ”The New Raphael”, Vincenzo Camuccini, as the author of the London copy but could not prove this beyond any doubt. In the new edition of his former student Jan Sammer's ”72 Virgins” a recently discovered copy made in December 1821 by German star artist Electrine von Freyberg, née Stuntz, in Camuccini's home serves as this final proof. The ink-brush-drawing closely resembles the folds and details of the London work - but the faces are completely different, being consistent with Raphael's style in the year 1505. Unlike the London faces, which present a full catalogue of typical neo-classicist Camuccini idiosyncrasies. These are examined in detail in a 2026 paper published by ArtWatch UK in which the similarities with the Prado's Holy Family with a Lamb are scrutinized as well.

== Painting materials ==
The palette is relatively limited compared to other works by Raphael. The sky and the blue drapery of the Virgin are painted in natural ultramarine and azurite; the artist further employed lead-tin yellow, malachite and verdigris.

== See also ==
- List of paintings by Raphael
